= Sibby Nichols =

Canadian ice hockey and lacrosse player

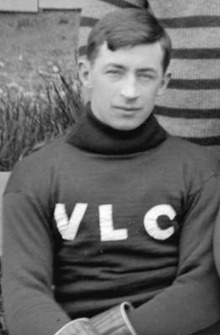
- Nichols with the Vancouver Lacrosse Club in 1912
- Born: August 10, 1884 Alexandria, Ontario, Canada
- Died: January 20, 1957 (aged 72) Los Angeles, California, United States
- Height: 5 ft 8 in (173 cm)
- Weight: 150 lb (68 kg; 10 st 10 lb)
- Position: Left wing
- Shot: Left
- Played for: Seattle Metropolitans; Spokane Canaries; Victoria Aristocrats; Vancouver Millionaires; Moncton Victorias; Montreal Shamrocks
- Playing career: 1904–1917; 1919–20

Sebastian John "Sibby" Nichols (August 10, 1884 – January 20, 1957) was a Canadian professional ice hockey player who played 110 games in various amateur and professional leagues, including the Eastern Canada Amateur Hockey Association and Pacific Coast Hockey Association. Amongst the teams he played with were the Montreal Shamrocks, Vancouver Millionaires, Victoria Aristocrats, Spokane Canaries, and Seattle Metropolitans. He also played lacrosse with the Vancouver Lacrosse Club.

== Biography ==
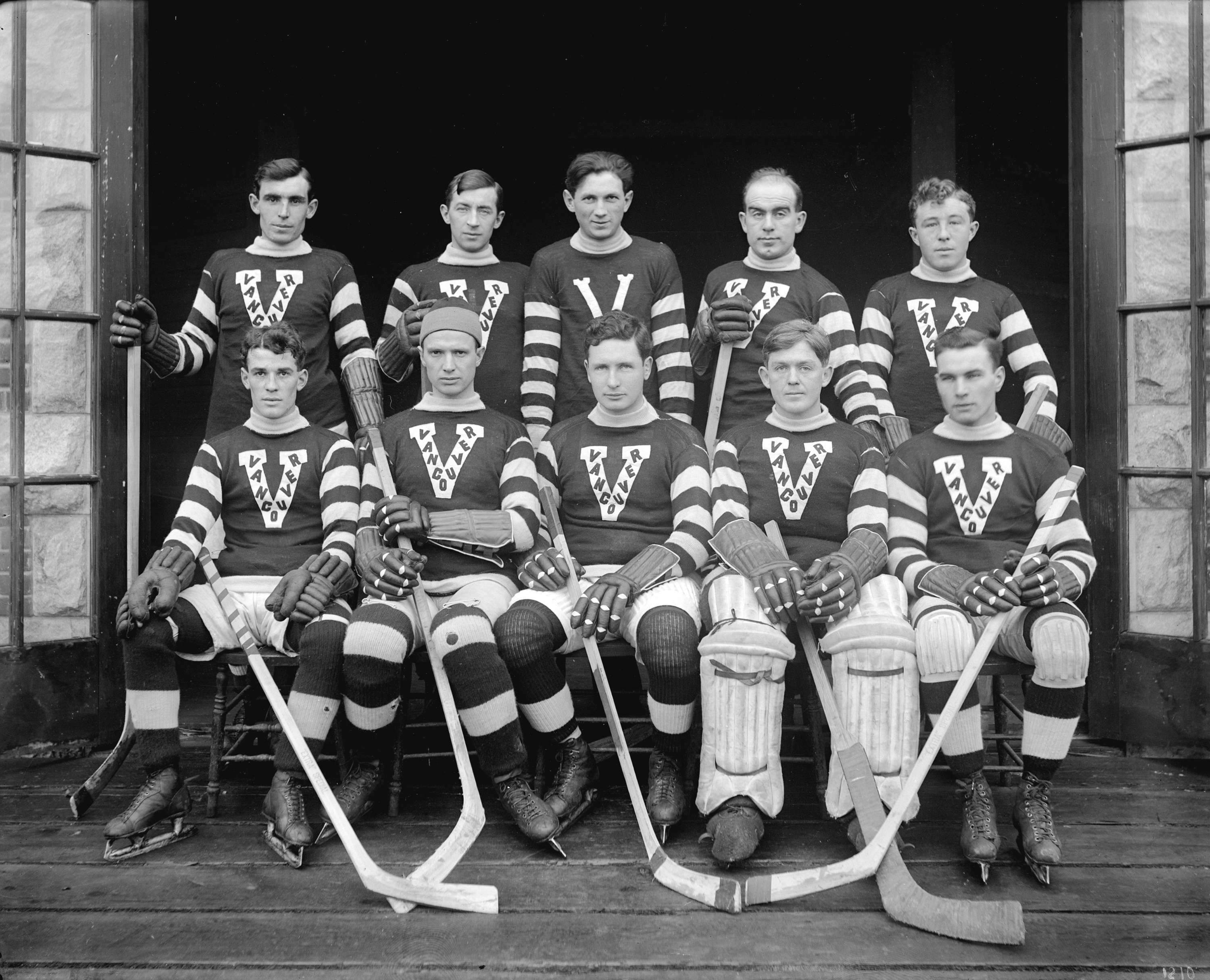
Nichols, second from left in the back row, with the 1913–14 Vancouver Millionaires

Nichols started out playing hockey in Montreal, Quebec where he represented the Montreal Shamrocks, Montreal Light Heat Power, and Montreal Astor-Canadien in different leagues. In the 1910–11 season he also played for the Moncton Victorias of the IPPHL and Belleville of the EOPHL, before moving out west to Vancouver and the Vancouver Millionaires in the PCHA for the 1912 season.

Nichols played for the Vancouver Millionaires from 1912 to 1916, though in the 1914–15 season when the Millionaires won its only Stanley Cup he was with the military and stationed in Asia on the ship RMS Empress of Russia at the outbreak of World War I. Back in the league for the 1915–16 season Nichols played one game with the Millionaires before moving on to the Victoria Aristocrats.

The Aristocrats were transferred to Spokane, Washington for the 1916–17 PCHA season and played there for one year as the Spokane Canaries, with Nichols tallying 10 goals. In March 1917 Nichols entered the Canadian Over-Seas Expeditionary Forces and did not play for two seasons before making a brief comeback in the 1919–20 season with the Seattle Metropolitans, appearing in the 1920 Stanley Cup Final.

Nichols was born in Alexandria in the township of North Glengarry, Ontario in 1884, and he died in Los Angeles in 1957.

== Statistics ==
CAHL-I = Canadian Amateur Hockey League-Intermediate, MMfHL = Montreal Manufacturers Hockey League, MCSHL = Montreal City Senior Hockey League
IPPHL = Inter-Provincial Professional Hockey League, EOPHL = Eastern Ontario Professional Hockey League, Exhb. = Exhibition games

			Regular season					Playoffs
Season	Team	League	GP	G	A	Pts	PIM	GP	G	A	Pts	PIM
1907–08	Montreal Shamrocks-2	CAHL-I	3	5	0	5	–	–	–	–	–	–
1908–09	Montreal Shamrocks-2	CAHL-I	6	–	–	–	–	–	–	–	–	–
	Montreal Light Heat Power	MMfHL	10	11	0	11	7	1	1	0	1	0
1909	Montreal Shamrocks	ECHA	2	0	0	0	3	–	–	–	–	–
1909–10	Montreal Light Heat Power	MMfHL	9	11	0	11	–	–	–	–	–	–
1909–10	Montreal Shamrocks	CHA	1	1	0	1	0	–	–	–	–	–
1910–11	Montreal Light Heat Power	MMfHL	3	8	0	8	4	–	–	–	–	–
	Montreal Astor-Canadien	MCSHL	2	2	0	2	2	–	–	–	–	–
	Moncton Victorias	IPPHL	5	13	0	13	4	4	14	0	14	0
	Belleville	EOPHL	2	3	0	3	–	–	–	–	–	–
1912	Vancouver Millionaires	PCHA	15	19	0	19	35	–	–	–	–	–
1912–13	Vancouver Millionaires	PCHA	1	0	0	0	0	–	–	–	–	–
1913–14	Vancouver Millionaires	PCHA	12	14	6	20	21	–	–	–	–	–
1914–15
1915–16	Vancouver Millionaires	PCHA	1	0	0	0	0	–	–	–	–	–
	PCHA All-Stars	Exhb.	2	2	0	2	0	–	–	–	–	–
	Victoria Aristocrats	PCHA	11	12	10	22	3	–	–	–	–	–
1916–17	Spokane Canaries	PCHA	23	10	11	21	68	–	–	–	–	–
1917–18
1918–19
1919–20	Seattle Metropolitans	PCHA	4	0	0	0	3	2	0	0	0	0
		Stanley Cup	–	–	–	–	–	4	0	0	0	0
PCHA totals			67	55	27	82	130	0	0	0	0	0

Statistics from Society of International Hockey Research at sihrhockey.org
