= Tommy Dunderdale =

Australian-Canadian ice hockey player (1887–1960)

- Hockey Hall of Fame, 1974
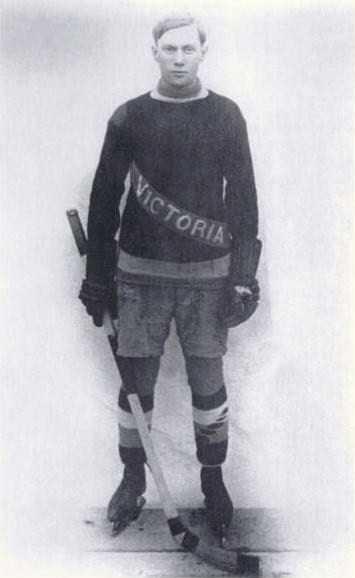
- Born: 6 May 1887 Benalla, Victoria, Australia
- Died: 15 December 1960 (aged 73) Winnipeg, Manitoba, Canada
- Height: 5 ft 8 in (173 cm)
- Weight: 160 lb (73 kg; 11 st 6 lb)
- Position: Centre
- Shot: Right
- Played for: Winnipeg Strathconas; Winnipeg Maple Leafs; Winnipeg Shamrocks; Montreal Shamrocks; Quebec Bulldogs; Victoria Cougars; Portland Rosebuds; Saskatoon Crescents; Edmonton Eskimos
- Playing career: 1906–1924

Thomas Dunderdale (6 May 1887 – 15 December 1960) was an Australian-Canadian professional ice hockey player, most often at the centre forward position. Born in the Colony of Victoria (now part of Australia), he moved to England with his family in 1894, then to Canada in 1904. He played in Winnipeg for three seasons, from 1906 to 1910. In 1910, he joined the Montreal Shamrocks of the Canadian Hockey Association and the National Hockey Association (NHA), before moving on to the Quebec Bulldogs the following season. In 1911–12, he joined the Victoria Aristocrats of the newly formed Pacific Coast Hockey Association (PCHA), playing nine seasons in total in Victoria. He split his seasons in Victoria with a three-season stint with the Portland Rosebuds between 1915 and 1918. After the PCHA folded in 1923, Dunderdale played one season in the Western Canada Hockey League (WCHL), splitting the season between the Saskatoon Crescents and the Edmonton Eskimos.

In 1974, Dunderdale became the only Australian-born player to be inducted into the Hockey Hall of Fame. He is credited with scoring the first penalty shot goal in ice hockey history.

== Early life ==
Dunderdale was born in Benalla in the Colony of Victoria (now part of Australia) on 6 May 1887. His parents were originally from England and returned to Lancashire in 1894 but in 1904, they resettled to Ottawa, Ontario. Tommy first played organised ice hockey at the age of 17 with his Waller Street School team. In 1905 he moved to Winnipeg, Manitoba and played the 1905–06 season with the amateur Winnipeg Ramblers.

== Playing career ==
Dunderdale turned professional in 1906–07 with the Winnipeg Strathconas. He played three seasons for the franchise, which was also known as the Winnipeg Maple Leafs and the Winnipeg Shamrocks, scoring on average more than two points per game, with the majority of the points being goals. In 1909–10, Dunderdale moved east, and played with the Montreal Shamrocks, first with the Canadian Hockey Association, and later with the National Hockey Association (NHA). That season, he appeared in 15 games overall, and scored 21 goals. He played the 1910–11 season for the Quebec Bulldogs of the NHA, finishing second on the team in scoring, with 13 goals, even though he played only nine out of 16 games, and receiving 25 penalty minutes.

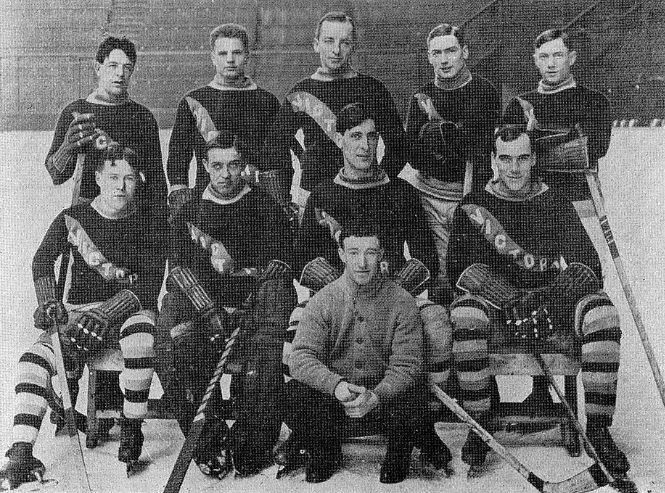
Dunderdale (top row, far right) with the 1914–15 Victoria Aristocrats

Dunderdale went back west in the 1911–12 season, joining the Victoria Aristocrats of the newly formed Pacific Coast Hockey Association (PCHA). He would spend the rest of his career playing in the west, having played only two seasons east of the Manitoba-Ontario border. Scoring 24 goals in 16 games, Dunderdale received his first out of six First All-Star team selections in the PCHA, as well as his first of four consecutive. In the next two seasons, Dunderdale recorded similar statistics to his first season in the PCHA, again scoring 24 goals in both seasons, and he was named to the First All-Star team in both seasons. The 1912–13 season saw the Victoria Aristocrats challenge the Quebec Bulldogs for the Stanley Cup. Although the Aristocrats won the series, their challenge was not accepted by the Stanley Cup trustees. The 1914–15 season saw Dunderdale named to the First All-Star team for his fourth consecutive time, as he scored 17 goals and assisted on 10 others, for 27 points in 17 games.

In the 1915–16 season, Dunderdale joined the Portland Rosebuds. In his first season with the Rosebuds, he dropped below a point per game for the first time in his career. The Rosebuds became the first American team to challenge for the Stanley Cup that year, losing a best-of-five series 3–2 to the Montreal Canadiens. Dunderdale played in all five games of the series, scoring two points. The following season, he scored 22 goals in 24 games, returning to his usual offensive output. However, he was more noted that season for his number of penalty minutes, setting a league record with 141 minutes. The 1917–18 season was his last in Portland, as he scored 14 goals in 18 games. Dunderdale left as their leading penalty minute getter, and as their second-most prolific goal scorer, with 50 goals.

Dunderdale rejoined the Victoria Aristocrats in the 1918–19 season. After recording only nine points in 20 games in his first season back with the Aristocrats, he scored 26 goals in 22 games in the 1919–20 season, en route to his fifth First All-Star team selection. Dunderdale played three more seasons for Victoria, which was renamed from the Aristocrats to the Cougars for the 1921–22 season, playing 75 games in total and scoring 41 points. He scored a bit under a point per game during the 1920–21 and the 1921–22 seasons, while in the 1922–23 season, his last with Victoria, he was limited to only two goals in 27 games. He was named to the First All-Star Team for the sixth time in 1922. Following the conclusion of the 1922–23 season, the PCHA folded. Dunderdale played another season in the Western Canada Hockey League (WCHL), splitting the 1923–24 season between the Saskatoon Crescents and the Edmonton Eskimos, scoring three points in 17 games overall.

Dunderdale is credited with scoring the first penalty shot goal in history. The first goal was scored on 12 December 1921 by Dunderdale on Hugh Lehman. The shot was taken from one of three dots painted on the ice 35 feet (11 m) from the goal. Players had to skate to the dot and shoot the puck from the dot.

Dunderdale retired at the end of the 1923–24 season. He retired as the PCHA's leading goal scorer, with 194 goals in total. He was a six-time PCHA First Team All-Star, and led the league in goals in three seasons, and in points in two. After retiring from playing, he coached and managed teams in Edmonton, Los Angeles, and Winnipeg. He died on 15 December 1960, and became the only Australian-born player to be inducted into the Hockey Hall of Fame, in 1974.

== Playing style ==
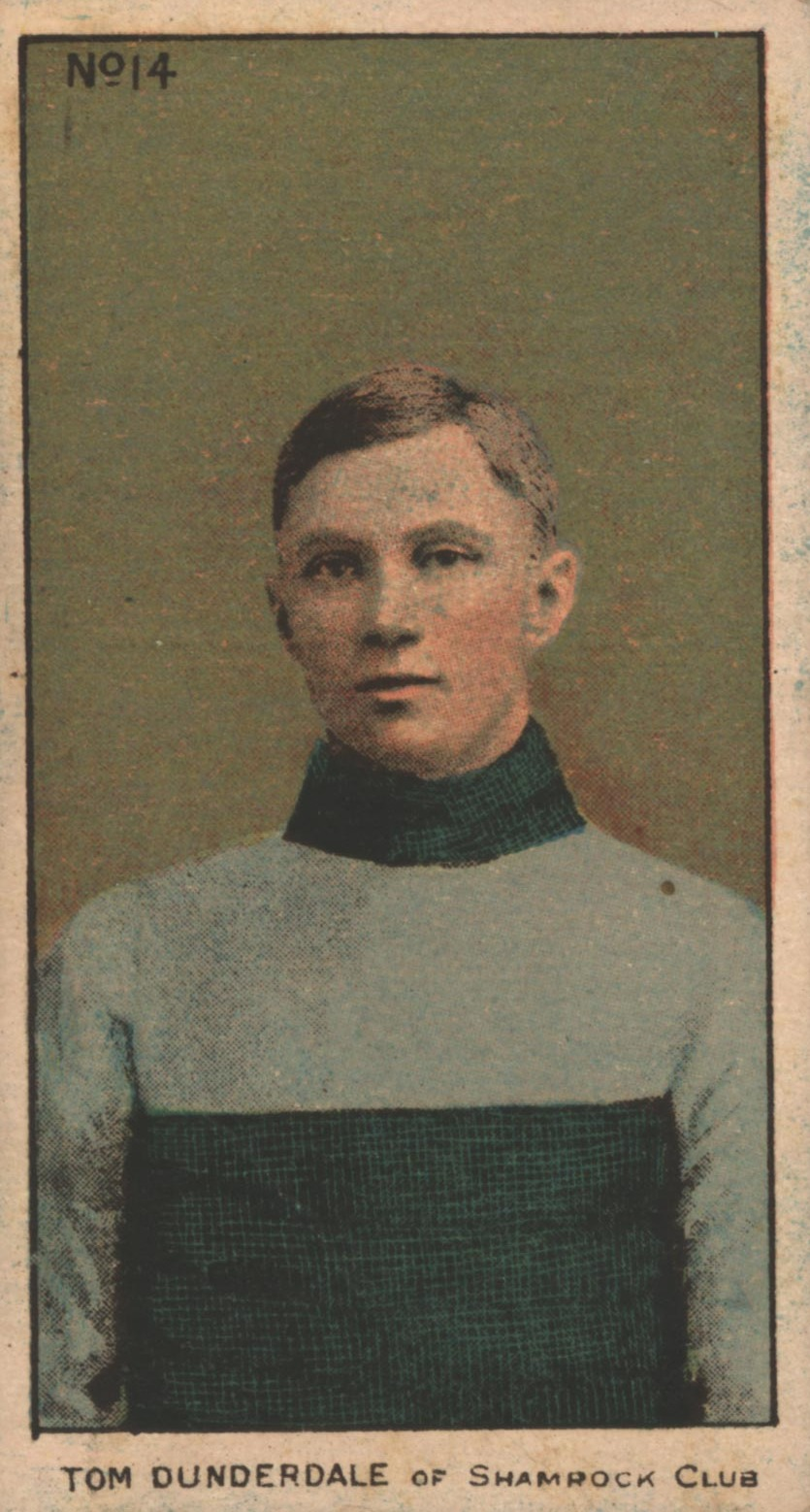
Dunderdale with the Montreal Shamrocks

"Dunderdale tore into the game and went at full tilt every second. 'Watch that boy play hockey,' was the frequent ejaculation of excited fans as Dunderdale time and again made tracks down the wing or centre ice, twisted, curved and circled, and then with that dexterity which features his play moved the puck inches backwards, forwards or sideways, while he mystified the opposing players as he worked for a position to slam in his shot. Dunderdale is shooting accurately and hard, and there were very few of his shots that were wide, and those that were usually only missed by a matter of inches."

— Victoria Daily Times describing Dunderdale after a January 16, 1920 game between the Victoria Aristocrats and Vancouver Millionaires.

Dunderdale, who most often held down the centre forward position on his team, but sometimes also played at wing or as a rover, was noted as being an excellent stickhandler and a fast skater, and prone to dangerous zig zag rushes down the ice. He also had a hard and accurate shot, which helped him score many goals wherever he played.

One self-detrimental aspect to Dunderdale's game was that he liked to rough it up physically on a consistent basis, which many times led to him being penalized by the referees and sent off to the sidelines. He often contended for the position as the "bad man" of the PCHA, which was the common epithet in the newspapers for the player with the most penalty minutes. During the 1916–17 season, with Portland, when he recorded far over 100 penalty minutes, it went so far that the Vancouver Sun gleefully cheered on him after a game against the Spokane Canaries when he succeeded in playing the whole game without getting penalized. The Vancouver Daily World made the same observation during the 1917–18 season, when Dunderdale went a game without a penalty, and pointed out that if the forward "would cut out the rough stuff and keep on the ice instead of the bench, he would be one of the most effective players in the league."

== Career statistics ==
=== Regular season and playoffs ===
			Regular season					Playoffs
Season	Team	League	GP	G	A	Pts	PIM	GP	G	A	Pts	PIM
1905–06	Winnipeg Ramblers	MIHA	—	—	—	—	—	—	—	—	—	—
1906–07	Winnipeg Strathconas	MHL	10	8	0	8	—	—	—	—	—	—
1907–08	Winnipeg Maple Leafs	MHL	3	1	0	1	—	—	—	—	—	—
1907–08	Strathcona	MHL	5	11	1	12	17	3	6	1	7	3
1908–09	Winnipeg Shamrocks	MHL	9	17	7	24	9	3	3	0	3	6
1909–10	Montreal Shamrocks	CHA	3	7	0	7	5	—	—	—	—	—
1910	Montreal Shamrocks	NHA	12	14	0	14	19	—	—	—	—	—
1910–11	Quebec Bulldogs	NHA	9	13	0	13	25	—	—	—	—	—
1911–12	Victoria Senators	PCHA	16	24	0	24	25	—	—	—	—	—
1912–13	Victoria Senators	PCHA	15	24	5	29	36	—	—	—	—	—
1913–14	Victoria Aristocrats	PCHA	16	24	4	28	34	—	—	—	—	—
1914	Victoria Aristocrats	Stanley Cup	—	—	—	—	—	3	3	0	3	11
1914–15	Victoria Aristocrats	PCHA	17	17	10	27	22	6	4	4	8	6
1915–16	Portland Rosebuds	PCHA	18	14	3	17	45	5	1	1	2	9
1916–17	Portland Rosebuds	PCHA	24	22	4	26	141	—	—	—	—	—
1917–18	Portland Rosebuds	PCHA	18	14	6	20	57	—	—	—	—	—
1918–19	Victoria Aristocrats	PCHA	20	5	4	9	28	—	—	—	—	—
1919–20	Victoria Aristocrats	PCHA	22	26	7	33	35	—	—	—	—	—
1920–21	Victoria Aristocrats	PCHA	24	9	11	20	18	—	—	—	—	—
1921–22	Victoria Cougars	PCHA	24	13	6	19	37	—	—	—	—	—
1922–23	Victoria Cougars	PCHA	27	2	0	2	16	2	0	1	1	0
1923–24	Saskatoon Crescents	WCHL	6	1	0	1	4	—	—	—	—	—
1923–24	Edmonton Eskimos	WCHL	11	1	1	2	5	—	—	—	—	—
PCHA Totals			231	194	60	254	494	13	5	6	11	15
