= Albert Kerr =

Albert Kerr "The Brockville Cannonball"
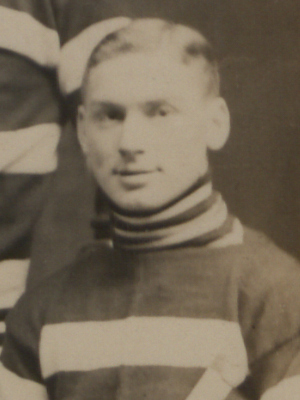
- Albert Kerr in 1911.
- Born: March 8, 1889 Brockville, Ontario
- Died: September 17, 1941 (aged 52) Iroquois Falls, Ontario
- Height: 5 ft 10 in (178 cm)
- Weight: 175 lb (79 kg; 12 st 7 lb)
- Position: Left wing
- Shot: Right
- Played for: Pittsburgh Lyceum (WPHL); Pittsburgh Athletic Club (WPHL); Toronto Pros (OPHL); Ottawa Senators (ECHA, CHA, NHA); Victoria Aristocrats (PCHA); Spokane Canaries (PCHA)
- Playing career: 1907–1920

Albert Daniel "Dubbie" Kerr (March 8, 1889 – September 17, 1941) was a Canadian professional ice hockey player. He was a member of the 1909 and 1911 Ottawa Senators Stanley Cup-winning teams. Born in Brockville, Ontario, he started out as a professional with the Pittsburgh Lyceum and Pittsburgh Athletic Club in 1907 before returning to Canada with the Toronto Pros in 1908. He played with the Senators from 1909 until 1912. In 1913, he moved out west to play in the Pacific Coast Hockey Association until 1920 for the Victoria Aristocrats.

== Playing career ==
Kerr started his career in his hometown of Brockville, Ontario, playing junior and intermediate amateur hockey for Brockville of the Ontario Hockey Association. He turned professional in Pittsburgh, Pennsylvania in 1907–08. Kerr started 1908–09 with Pittsburgh, but left after seven games to join the Toronto team of the Ontario Professional Hockey League. After three games in Toronto, Kerr jumped to the Ottawa Senators and became a star.

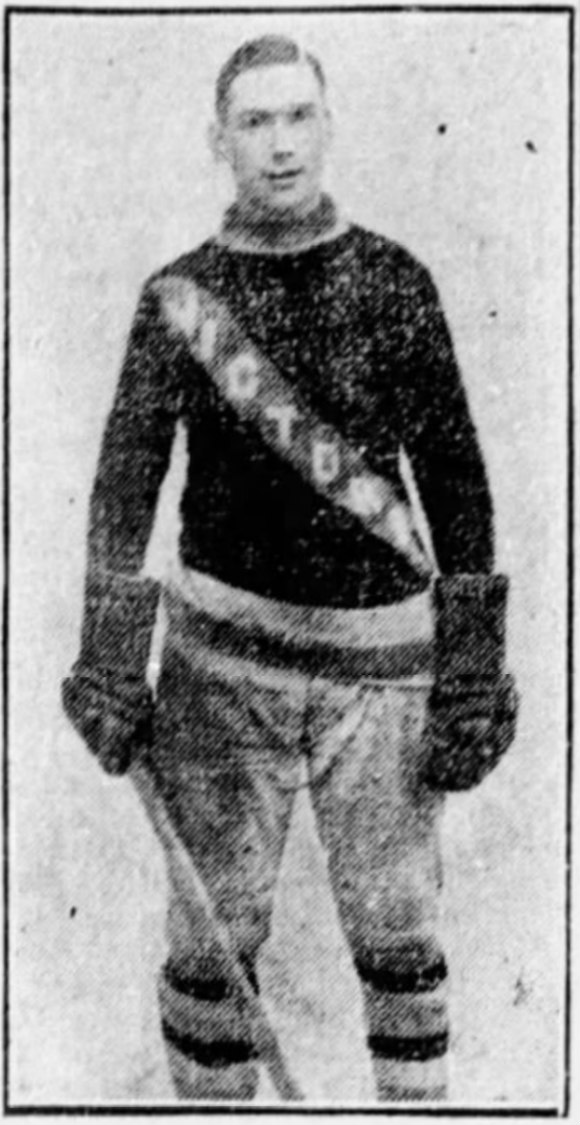
Kerr with the Victoria Aristocrats.

Ottawa was rebuilding after the "Silver Seven" years and was seeking a player on left wing. Executive Weldy Bate had read that Kerr had scored five goals in a game for Toronto. Bate sent coach Pete Green who confirmed Kerr's ability and an offer was made to Kerr, who then moved to Ottawa. He played with future Hall of Famers Marty Walsh and Billy Gilmour. He also played alongside Bruce Ridpath and scored 20 goals in nine games as Ottawa won the Eastern Canada Hockey Association title and the Stanley Cup.

In 1910, Kerr suffered a serious skate cut to his right eye, at first losing his sight, necessitating an eye operation, limiting his play to five games. He would recover to play in the 1910–11 season. During the 1910–11 season, he along with Walsh and Ridpath, scored in twelve consecutive games, including five in one game and had 32 goals in 16 games to finish behind Walsh in NHA scoring. Kerr, Ridpath and Walsh had one, two and three goals respectively in a 7–4 Stanley Cup challenge win over Galt, Ontario.

Kerr retired after the 1911–12 season but Lester Patrick lured him to Victoria, British Columbia of the Pacific Coast Hockey Association in 1913–14. He played three seasons with Victoria Aristocrats and moved with the club to Spokane for the 1916–17 season when the Victoria arena was taken over for wartime activities. Kerr served during World War I from 1917 to 1919, but returned to ice hockey to play another season with Victoria, retiring in 1920.

== Personal life ==
At the time of his death in 1941, Kerr was an employee of the McNamara Construction Company (founded by hockey players George and Howard McNamara) in Iroquois Falls, Ontario. He was laid to rest in Toronto, Ontario.

== Statistics ==
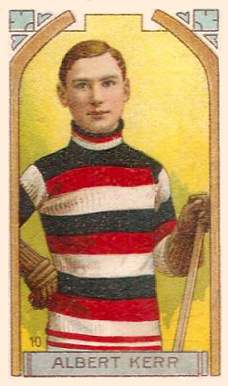
Albert Kerr with the Ottawa Senators on an Imperial Tobacco hockey card.

			Regular season					Playoffs
Season	Team	League	GP	G	A	Pts	PIM	GP	G	A	Pts	PIM
1906–07	Brockville HC	OHA	4	15	0	15	–	–	–	–	–	–
1907–08	Pittsburgh Lyceum	WPHL	1	0	0	0	0	–	–	–	–	–
	Pittsburgh Athletic Club	WPHL	17	15	0	15	0	–	–	–	–	–
1908–09	Pittsburgh Athletic Club	WPHL	7	4	0	4	–	–	–	–	–	–
	Toronto Professionals	OPHL	3	6	0	6	9	–	–	–	–	–
	Ottawa Senators	ECHA	9	20	0	20	–	–	–	–	–	–
1909–10	Ottawa Senators	CHA	1	3	0	3	9	–	–	–	–	–
1910	Ottawa Senators	NHA	4	8	2	10	31	–	–	–	–	–
		Stanley Cup	–	–	–	–	–	1	0	0	0	–
1910–11	Ottawa Senators	NHA	16	33	0	33	45	–	–	–	–	–
		Stanley Cup	–	–	–	–	–	2	2	0	2	–
1911–12	Ottawa Senators	NHA	18	24	0	24	35	–	–	–	–	–
1912–13
1913–14	Victoria Aristocrats	PCHA	16	20	11	31	15	–	–	–	–	–
1914	Victoria Aristocrats	Stanley Cup	–	–	–	–	–	3	1	0	0	3
1914–15	Victoria Aristocrats	PCHA	17	14	4	18	15	–	–	–	–	–
1915–16	Victoria Aristocrats	PCHA	18	16	12	28	46	–	–	–	–	–
1916–17	Spokane Canaries	PCHA	23	20	11	31	58	–	–	–	–	–
1917–18
1919	Victoria Aristocrats	PCHA	1	0	0	0	0	–	–	–	–	–
1919–20	Victoria Aristocrats	PCHA	16	8	1	9	12	–	–	–	–	–
NHA totals			38	65	2	67	111	–	–	–	–	–
PCHA totals			91	78	39	117	146	–	–	–	–	–
Stanley Cup totals			–	–	–	–	–	6	3	0	3	–

== Awards ==
- 1907–08 WPHL 2nd All-Star team
- 1908–09 ECHA 1st All-Star team
- 1913–14 PCHA 1st All-Star team
- 1916–17 PCHA 2nd All-Star team
