= Lloyd Cook =

Canadian ice hockey defenceman (1890–1964)

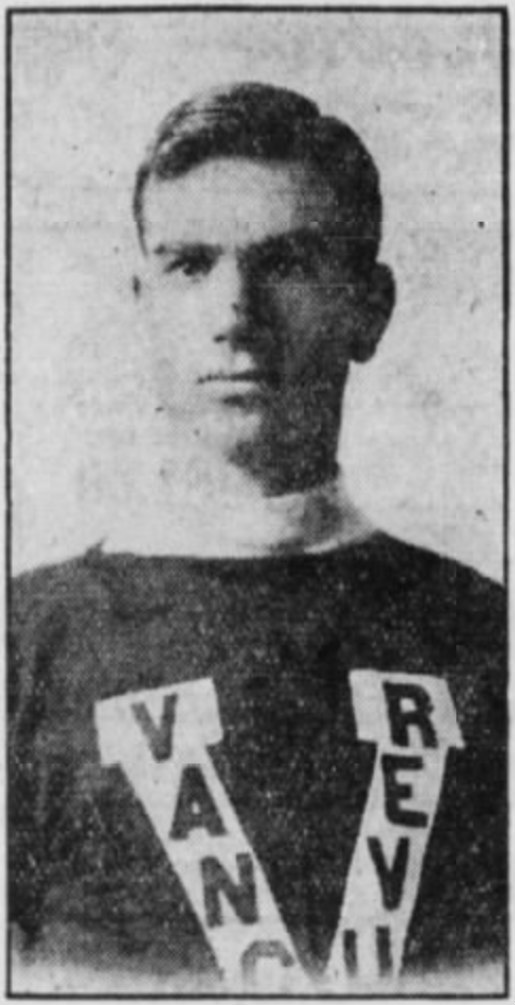
- Cook with the Vancouver Millionaires
- Born: March 21, 1890 Lynden, Ontario, Canada
- Died: October 9, 1964 (aged 74) Taber, Alberta, Canada
- Height: 6 ft 0 in (183 cm)
- Weight: 170 lb (77 kg; 12 st 2 lb)
- Position: Defence
- Shot: Left
- Played for: Vancouver Millionaires; Spokane Canaries; Vancouver Maroons; Boston Bruins
- Playing career: 1908–1932

Lloyd Tramblyn "Farmer" Cook (March 21, 1890 – October 9, 1964) was a Canadian professional ice hockey defenceman. He played for the Vancouver Millionaires/Maroons and Spokane Canaries of the Pacific Coast Hockey Association and for the Boston Bruins of the National Hockey League. He won the Stanley Cup in 1915 with the Millionaires and was named to the PCHA first all-star team three times.

== Early career ==
Cook was born in Lynden, Ontario, in 1890. In 1912–13, he played for the Fernie Ghostriders of the BHL and the Taber Chefs (on the latter club with his brothers Arnold, Wilbur and Leo) of the ASHL. The following season, he played for the ASHL's Edmonton Dominions, scoring eight goals in four regular season games and four goals in seven playoff games. He was named to the league's first all-star team.

== Pacific Coast Hockey Association ==
From 1914 to 1924, Cook played in the PCHA. He joined the Vancouver Millionaires in 1914–15 and had 17 points in 17 regular season games. In the 1915 Stanley Cup Final, he scored three goals in three games to help Vancouver win the Stanley Cup. The following season, Cook scored 18 goals in 18 games. He then played for the Spokane Canaries in 1916-17, where he was teammates with his younger brother, Leo.

In 1917–18, Cook returned to Vancouver, where he would play until 1924. He managed the team in 1919–20, and that season, he had 14 points in 21 games and was named to the PCHA first all-star team. The following season, he had 21 points in 24 games and was again named to the first all-star team. In 1922–23, Cook had a career-high 30 points in 30 games and was named to the first all-star team for the last time.

== Later career ==
In 1924, Cook was traded to the NHL's Boston Bruins. He played four games for Boston in 1924–25, scoring one goal. Cook then played in the California Professional League from 1925 to 1931. He played for teams in Culver City, Los Angeles, and San Francisco. In 1931–32, he was the head coach of the San Francisco Rangers, leading the team to a 12-12-6 record. Cook died in 1964.

== Career statistics ==
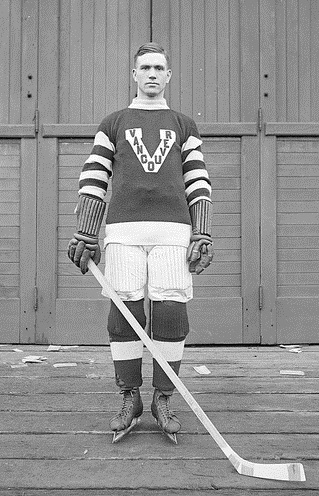
Cook with the Vancouver Millionaires.

=== Regular season and playoffs ===
			Regular season					Playoffs
Season	Team	League	GP	G	A	Pts	PIM	GP	G	A	Pts	PIM
1912–13	Taber Chefs	ASHL	—	—	—	—	—	2	1	0	1	4
1913–14	Edmonton Dominions	ASHL	4	8	0	8	13	7	4	0	4	16
1914–15	Vancouver Millionaires	PCHA	17	11	6	17	15	—	—	—	—	—
1914–15	Vancouver Millionaires	St-Cup	—	—	—	—	—	3	3	0	3	9
1915–16	Vancouver Millionaires	PCHA	18	18	3	21	24	—	—	—	—	—
1916–17	Spokane Canaries	PCHA	23	13	9	22	32	—	—	—	—	—
1917–18	Vancouver Millionaires	PCHA	18	6	4	10	11	2	0	0	0	0
1917–18	Vancouver Millionaires	St-Cup	—	—	—	—	—	5	2	0	2	12
1918–19	Vancouver Millionaires	PCHA	20	8	6	14	22	2	1	0	1	0
1919–20	Vancouver Millionaires	PCHA	21	10	4	14	15	2	1	0	1	0
1920–21	Vancouver Millionaires	PCHA	24	12	9	21	18	2	1	1	2	0
1920–21	Vancouver Millionaires	St-Cup	—	—	—	—	—	5	2	0	2	20
1921–22	Vancouver Millionaires	PCHA	24	2	3	5	9	2	1	0	1	0
1921–22	Vancouver Millionaires	West-P	—	—	—	—	—	2	1	0	1	2
1921–22	Vancouver Millionaires	St-Cup	—	—	—	—	—	5	1	0	1	6
1922–23	Vancouver Maroons	PCHA	30	19	11	30	33	2	0	0	0	6
1922–23	Vancouver Maroons	St-Cup	—	—	—	—	—	4	0	1	1	4
1923–24	Vancouver Maroons	PCHA	28	7	5	12	18	2	0	1	1	0
1923–24	Vancouver Maroons	West-P	—	—	—	—	—	3	2	1	3	2
1923–24	Vancouver Maroons	St-Cup	—	—	—	—	—	2	0	0	0	4
1924–25	Boston Bruins	NHL	4	1	0	1	0	—	—	—	—	—
1925–26	Culver City Pros	Cal-Pro	30	8	3	11	18	—	—	—	—	—
1926–27	LA Globe Ice Cream	Cal-Pro	30	—	—	—	—	—	—	—	—	—
1927–28	Los Angeles Richfields	Cal-Pro	22	13	2	15	18	—	—	—	—	—
1928–29	San Francisco Tigers	Cal-Pro	36	8	4	12	14	—	—	—	—	—
1929–30	San Francisco Tigers	Cal-Pro	36	4	3	7	—	—	—	—	—	—
1930–31	San Francisco Tigers	Cal-Pro	27	8	6	14	—	—	—	—	—	—
St-Cup totals			—	—	—	—	—	24	8	1	9	55
NHL totals			4	1	0	1	0	—	—	—	—	—
PCHA totals			223	106	60	166	197	14	4	2	6	6
