= Hec Fowler =

Canadian ice hockey and soccer player

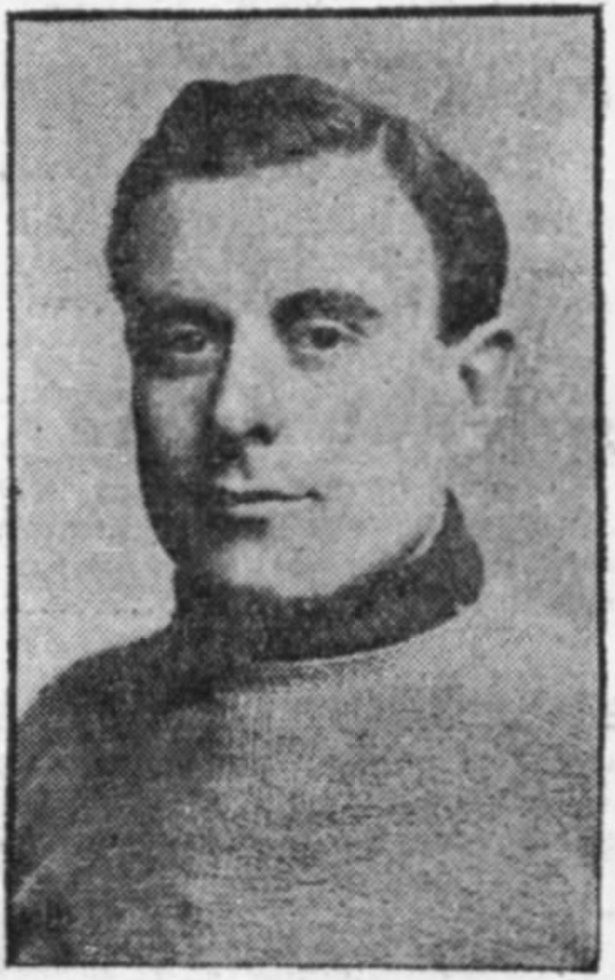
- Fowler with the Victoria Aristocrats
- Born: October 14, 1892; Peterborough, Ontario, Canada
- Died: July 30, 1987 (aged 94); Saskatoon, Saskatchewan, Canada
- Height: 5 ft 11 in (180 cm)
- Weight: 190 lb (86 kg; 13 st 8 lb)
- Position: Goaltender
- Caught: Left
- Played for: Spokane Canaries; Seattle Metropolitans; Victoria Aristocrats; Victoria Cougars; Boston Bruins; Edmonton Eskimos
- Playing career: 1909–1931

Norman Boswell "Hec" Fowler (October 14, 1892 – July 30, 1987) was a two-sport athlete from Canada. He was a professional ice hockey goaltender who played in the Pacific Coast Hockey Association and National Hockey League between 1916 and 1925. He was also a soccer goalkeeper for Saskatoon Thistle.

He was the last surviving former player of the Spokane Canaries.

== Playing career ==
Fowler played for various senior league teams in his hometown of Saskatoon from 1909 to 1916, appearing in the Allan Cup playoffs in 1916, before turning professional with the Spokane Canaries of the PCHA in 1917. The Canaries, citing poor attendance, disbanded for the following season, and while Fowler had played poorly for Spokane, the defending Stanley Cup champion Seattle Metropolitans was confident enough to sign him as their goaltender. With Fowler at the helm, the Mets won the league championship but were upset in the playoffs by the Vancouver Millionaires.

At that point, Fowler enlisted in the military for the last year of World War I, and when he mustered out of the service, signed with the Victoria Cougars for the 1920 season. Most spectacularly, he turned aside three penalty shots in a match against the Millionaires on December 12, 1921.

He played five seasons in all for the Cougars before being sold to the expansion Boston Bruins of the National Hockey League in October 1924. Behind a weak defense, Fowler was repeatedly shelled, and it was reported that he was displeased with the team's direction. In his last game with Boston, he allowed nine goals in 49 minutes against the Toronto St. Patricks before leaving the ice on his own; he was replaced in net by left winger George Redding. Fowler admitted to a Montreal Gazette reporter afterward that he was deliberately letting in goals, so that the Bruins would be embarrassed enough by the loss to obtain better players. As a result, he was suspended indefinitely by Boston, fined $200, and ultimately released.

He signed with the Edmonton Eskimos of the Western Canada Hockey League to finish the season, but took the next year off. Fowler played one more season in Edmonton in 1927, then three for the Oakland Sheiks of the professional California Hockey League between 1928 and 1931 – leading the team to consecutive championships his last two seasons – before retiring.

On June 11, 1983, Norman "Hec" Fowler was installed into the Saskatchewan Sports Hall of Fame in Regina Saskatchewan under Norman "Heck" Fowler.

== Lacrosse ==
As with many other players of the era, Fowler was a lacrosse player in the summers, serving as secretary of the Vancouver Lacrosse Club and acting as an umpire, referee, and timekeeper in matches.

== Career statistics ==
=== Regular season and playoffs ===
			Regular season								Playoffs
Season	Team	League	GP	W	L	T	Min	GA	SO	GAA	GP	W	L	T	Min	GA	SO	GAA
1909–10	Saskatoon Rovers	SCJHL	—	—	—	—	—	—	—	—	—	—	—	—	—	—	—	—
1909–10	Saskatoon Bankers	SCSHL	1	1	0	0	60	2	0	2.00	—	—	—	—	—	—	—	—
1910–11	Saskatoon Westerns	SCHL	—	—	—	—	—	—	—	—	—	—	—	—	—	—	—	—
1911–12	Saskatoon Wholesalers	SKPHL	—	—	—	—	—	—	—	—	1	1	0	0	60	1	0	1.00
1911–12	Saskatoon Hoo-Hoos	SKPHL	1	1	0	0	60	6	0	6.00	—	—	—	—	—	—	—	—
1912–13	Saskatoon Rovers	N-SSHL	—	—	—	—	—	—	—	—	—	—	—	—	—	—	—	—
1913–14	Saskatoon R.Jays	N-SSHL	4	2	2	0	240	17	0	4.25	—	—	—	—	—	—	—	—
1914–15	Humboldt H/C	N-SSHL	—	—	—	—	—	—	—	—	1	0	1	0	60	7	0	7.00
1915–16	Saskatoon Pilgrims	SSHL	—	—	—	—	—	—	—	—	—	—	—	—	—	—	—	—
1915–16	Saskatoon Pilgrims	Al-Cup	—	—	—	—	—	—	—	—	2	0	2	0	120	10	0	5.00
1916–17	Spokane Canaries	PCHA	23	8	15	0	1383	143	0	6.20	—	—	—	—	—	—	—	—
1917–18	Seattle Metropolitans	PCHA	18	11	7	0	1168	65	1	3.34	2	0	1	1	120	3	0	1.50
1918–19	Military service
1919–20	Victoria Aristocrats	PCHA	22	10	12	0	1327	71	1	3.21	—	—	—	—	—	—	—	—
1920–21	Victoria Aristocrats	PCHA	24	10	13	1	1541	88	3	3.43	—	—	—	—	—	—	—	—
1921–22	Victoria Aristocrats	PCHA	24	11	12	1	1468	70	1	2.86	—	—	—	—	—	—	—	—
1922–23	Victoria Cougars	PCHA	30	16	14	0	1846	85	4	2.76	2	1	1	0	120	5	0	2.50
1923–24	Victoria Cougars	PCHA	30	11	18	1	1843	103	0	3.35	—	—	—	—	—	—	—	—
1924–25	Boston Bruins	NHL	7	1	6	0	409	42	0	6.16	—	—	—	—	—	—	—	—
1924–25	Edmonton Eskimos	WCHL	8	5	3	0	480	29	1	3.63	—	—	—	—	—	—	—	—
1926–27	Edmonton Eskimos	PHL	32	12	18	2	1879	127	0	4.06	—	—	—	—	—	—	—	—
1928–29	Oakland Sheiks	Cal-Pro	—	—	—	—	—	—	—	—	—	—	—	—	—	—	—	—
1929–30	Oakland Sheiks	Cal-Pro	42	24	12	6	2520	72	—	1.71	4	3	0	1	250	5	1	1.20
1930–31	Oakland Sheiks	Cal-Pro	—	—	—	—	—	—	—	—	4	2	1	1	254	11	0	2.60
PCHA totals			171	77	91	3	10,576	625	10	3.55	4	1	2	1	240	8	0	2.00
NHL totals			7	1	6	0	409	42	0	6.16	—	—	—	—	—	—	—	—

== Awards and achievements ==
- PCHA First All-Star Team in 1917.
- PCHA Second All-Star Team in 1918.
- Installed into the Saskatchewan Sports Hall of Fame June 11, 1983.
