= 1913–14 PCHA season =

Canadian pro ice hockey league season

- League: Pacific Coast Hockey Association
- Sport: Ice hockey
- Duration: December 5, 1913–February 24, 1914
- Number of teams: 3

Results
- Champion: Victoria Aristocrats
- Top scorer: Cyclone Taylor (Vancouver)

PCHA seasons
- ← 1912–13 1914–15 →

The 1913–14 PCHA season was the third season of the professional men's ice hockey Pacific Coast Hockey Association league. Season play ran from December 5, 1913, until February 24, 1914. Like the previous two seasons, teams were to play a 16-game schedule, but one game was cancelled. The Victoria Aristocrats club would be the PCHA champions. After the season, Victoria travelled to Toronto to play the Toronto Hockey Club, National Hockey Association (NHA) champions, in a challenge series for the 1914 Stanley Cup. Toronto won the series.

== League business ==
Frank Patrick became league president, succeeding C. E. Doherty. The Victoria Senators changed their name to the Victoria Aristocrats. In the fall of 1913, the PCHA and the NHA agreed to support a draft arrangement, whereby the PCHA could draft NHA players annually for four years. The PCHA would draft three players on a rotating basis among the NHA teams. The first draft, in 1914, would have the PCHA select one player from Ottawa, one from Quebec, and one from the Wanderers. An agreement was made with the NHA to send the PCHA champion east to play the NHA champion for the "world's championship" at the end of the season.

Rule changes

This season marked the introduction of the blue lines used in today's official ice hockey rinks. The league sub-divided the rink into three zones of 67 feet (20 m), allowing forward passing in the centre zone. This change was at the instigation of the Patrick brothers. The league also started awarding assists for players helping to set up a goal, allowing substitution at any time, banning players from within 5 feet (1.5 m) of a faceoff, having separate dressing rooms for the officials, allowing the kicking of the puck except to score and added a goal line between the posts of the goal net.

== Teams ==
1913–14 Pacific Coast Hockey Association
Team	City	Arena	Capacity
New Westminster Royals	Vancouver, British Columbia	Denman Arena	10,500
Vancouver Millionaires	Vancouver, British Columbia	Denman Arena	10,500
Victoria Aristocrats	Victoria, British Columbia	Patrick Arena	4,000

=== Map of teams ===
PCHA Teams

== Regular season ==
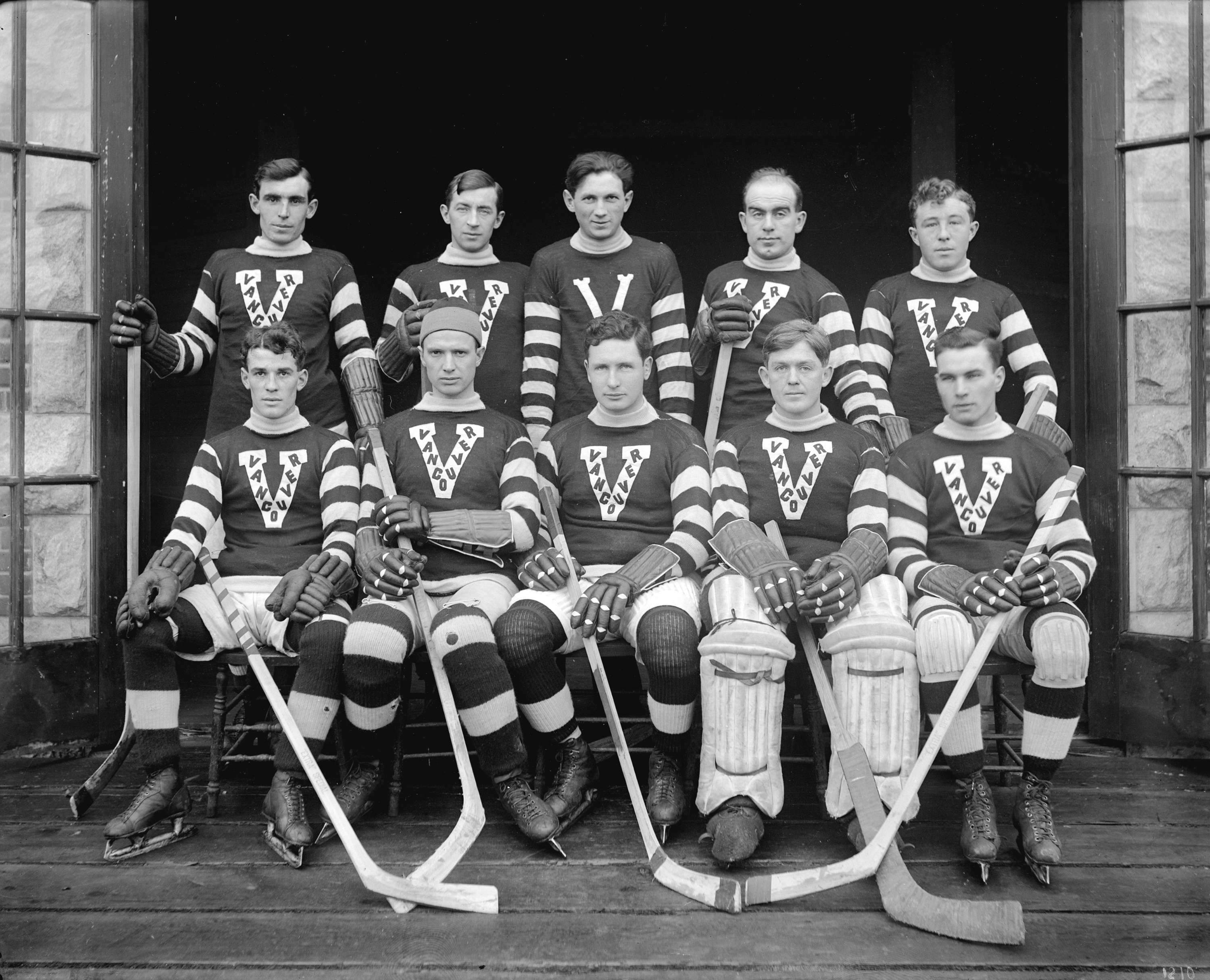
Vancouver Millionaires in 1913–14.

Cyclone Taylor won the scoring championship with 39 points. Taylor and Tommy Dunderdale won the goal-scoring championship with 24 goals. The top single-game scoring feat was accomplished by Eddie Oatman, who scored six goals in his final game of the season against Vancouver on February 24, 1914, to finish with 22 goals.

Victoria was in last place on January 23, but then won six games in a row to claim the league championship and the Paterson Cup.

=== Final standings ===
Note: W = Wins, L = Losses, T = Ties, GF= Goals For, GA = Goals against

Pacific Coast Hockey Association	GP	W	L	T	GF	GA
Victoria Aristocrats	16	10	6	0	86	80
New Westminster Royals	16	7	9	0	75	81
Vancouver Millionaires	16	7	9	0	89	89

reference - Vancouver Province Feb 28, 1914

== Stanley Cup playoffs ==
After the season, Victoria travelled to Toronto to play the Toronto Blueshirts, the NHA and Stanley Cup champion. A controversy occurred when it was revealed that the Victoria club had not filed a formal challenge. A letter arrived from the Stanley Cup trustees on March 17, that the trustees would not let the Stanley Cup travel west, as they did not consider Victoria a proper challenger because they had not formally notified the trustees. However, on March 18, Trustee William Foran stated that it was a misunderstanding. PCHA president Frank Patrick had not filed a challenge, because he had expected Emmett Quinn of the NHA to make all of the arrangements in his role as hockey commissioner, whereas the trustees thought they were being deliberately ignored. In any case, all arrangements had been ironed out and the Victoria challenge was accepted.

Date		Score		Score	Rules	Notes
March 14	Victoria	2	Toronto	5	NHA	
March 17	Victoria	5	Toronto	6	PCHA	15:00 OT
March 19	Victoria	1	Toronto	2	NHA	

== Exhibition series ==
Vancouver travelled to New York, and played in a tournament with the Quebec Bulldogs and Montreal Wanderers of the NHA.

== Schedule and results ==
Month	Day	Visitor	Score	Home	Score
Dec.	5	New Westminster	7	Vancouver	5
Dec.	9	Victoria	5	New Westminster	6
Dec.	12	New Westminster	2	Victoria	6
Dec.	16	Victoria	3	Vancouver	11
Dec.	19	Vancouver	5	New Westminster	4
Dec.	26	Vancouver	4	Victoria	9
Dec.	30	New Westminster	3	Vancouver	7
Jan.	2	New Westminster	5	Victoria	4
Jan.	6	Victoria	6	Vancouver	5
Jan.	9	Vancouver	3	New Westminster	2
Jan.	13	New Westminster	3	Victoria	5
Jan.	16	New Westminster	5	Vancouver	8
Jan.	20	Vancouver	7	Victoria	6 (OT 14'45")
Jan.	23	Victoria	4	New Westminster	6
Jan.	27	Victoria	5	Vancouver	3
Jan.	30	New Westminster	5	Victoria	7
Feb.	3	Vancouver	2	New Westminster	8
Feb.	6	New Westminster	3	Vancouver	1
Feb.	10	Vancouver	2	Victoria	5
Feb.	13	Victoria	2	New Westminster	1 (OT 36'46")
Feb.	17	Victoria	5	Vancouver	4 (OT 7'40")
Feb.	20	New Westminster	1	Victoria	8
Feb.	24	New Westminster	6	Vancouver	9
Feb.	28	Victoria	6	Vancouver	13

== Player statistics ==
=== Scoring leaders ===
Player	Team	GP	G	A	Pts	PIM
Cyclone Taylor	Vancouver Millionaires	16	24	15	39	18
Dubbie Kerr	Victoria Aristocrats	16	20	11	31	15
Tommy Dunderdale	Victoria Aristocrats	16	24	4	28	34
Eddie Oatman	New Westminster Royals	16	22	5	27	18
Ken Mallen	New Westminster Royals	16	20	6	26	46
Ran McDonald	New Westminster Royals	16	15	5	20	34
Sibby Nichols	Vancouver Millionaires	12	14	6	20	21
Frank Patrick	Vancouver Millionaires	16	11	9	20	3
Smokey Harris	Vancouver Millionaires	15	14	3	17	33
Didier Pitre	Vancouver Millionaires	15	14	2	16	12

=== Goaltenders ===
Name	Club	GP	GA	SO	Avg.
Bert Lindsay	Victoria	16	80		5.0
Hugh Lehman	New Westminster	16	81		5.06
Allan Parr	Vancouver	15	83		5.5
Clark	Vancouver	1	6		6.0

== All-Stars ==
- Hugh Lehman, New Westminster, goal
- Ernie Johnson, New Westminster, defence
- Frank Patrick, Vancouver, defence
- Cyclone Taylor, Vancouver, rover
- Tommy Dunderdale, Victoria, centre
- Eddie Oatman, New Westminster, right wing
- Dubbie Kerr, Victoria, left wing

Source: Coleman 1966

== See also ==
- Pacific Coast Hockey Association
- List of pre-NHL seasons
- 1913–14 NHA season
