= Leo Cook =

Canadian ice hockey player

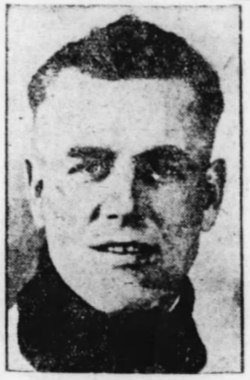
- Leo Cook
- Born: December 4, 1892; Teeterville, Ontario, Canada
- Died: September 3, 1964 (aged 71); Vancouver, British Columbia, Canada
- Height: 5 ft 9 in (175 cm)
- Weight: 165 lb (75 kg; 11 st 11 lb)
- Position: Centre
- Shot: Right
- Played for: Spokane Canaries; Vancouver Millionaires; Regina Capitals; Edmonton Eskimos
- Playing career: 1910–1931

John Leo Falconbridge Cook (December 4, 1892 – September 3, 1964) was a Canadian professional ice hockey player. He played with the Spokane Canaries and Vancouver Millionaires of the Pacific Coast Hockey Association, as well as the Regina Capitals and Edmonton Eskimos of the Western Canada Hockey League. He died in 1964.

Leo Cook played with his brother Lloyd Cook on the 1916–17 Spokane Canaries and 1917–18 Vancouver Millionaires teams.
