= Ran McDonald =

Canadian ice hockey player (1889–1950)

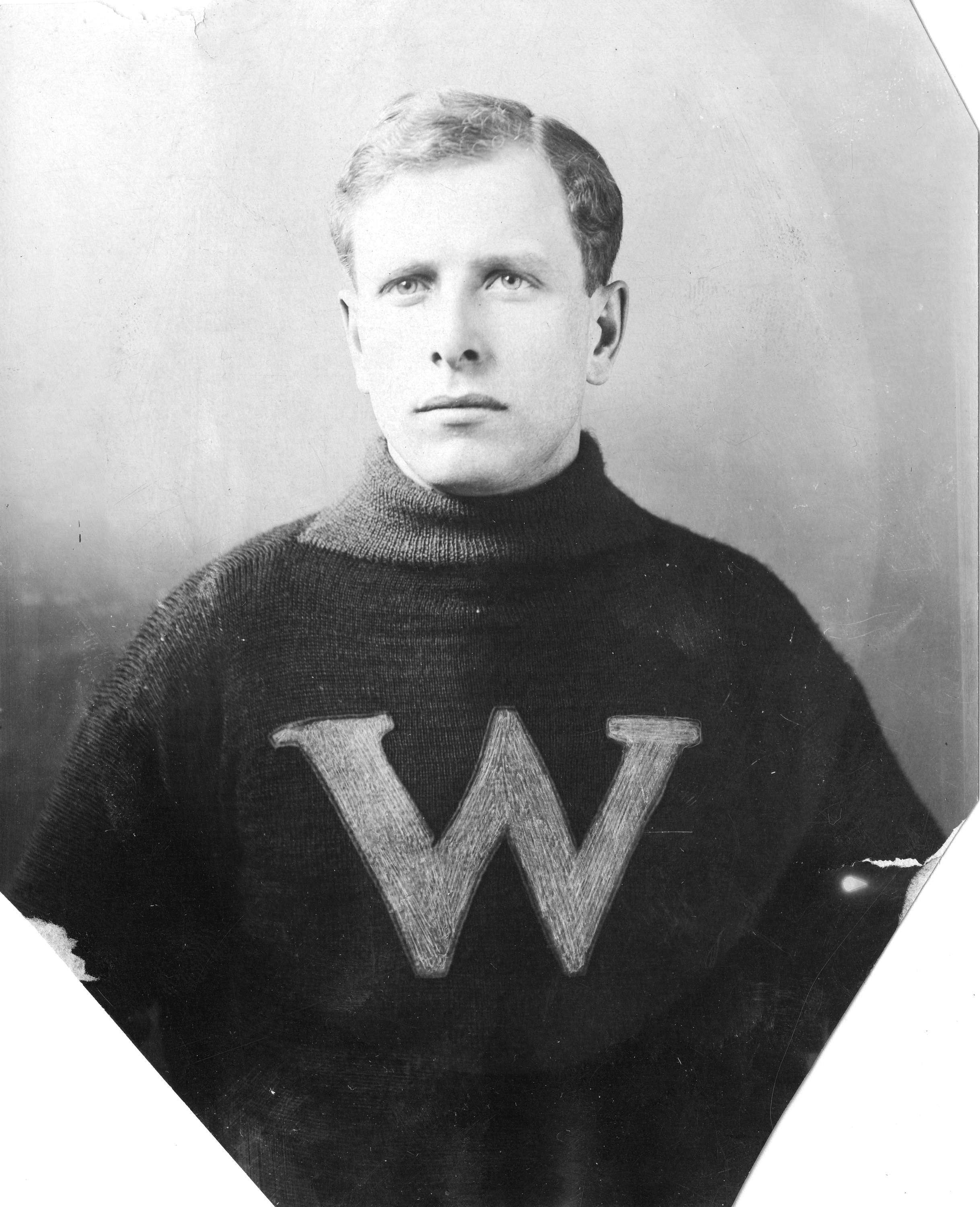
- McDonald in 1912 with the New Westminster Royals
- Born: November 21, 1889 Cashion's Glen, Ontario, Canada
- Died: January 29, 1950 (aged 60) Vancouver, British Columbia, Canada
- Height: 5 ft 8 in (173 cm)
- Weight: 170 lb (77 kg; 12 st 2 lb)
- Position: Right wing
- Shot: Right
- Played for: New Westminster Royals; Portland Rosebuds; Victoria Aristocrats; Spokane Canaries; Vancouver Millionaires; Seattle Metropolitans
- Playing career: 1907–1921

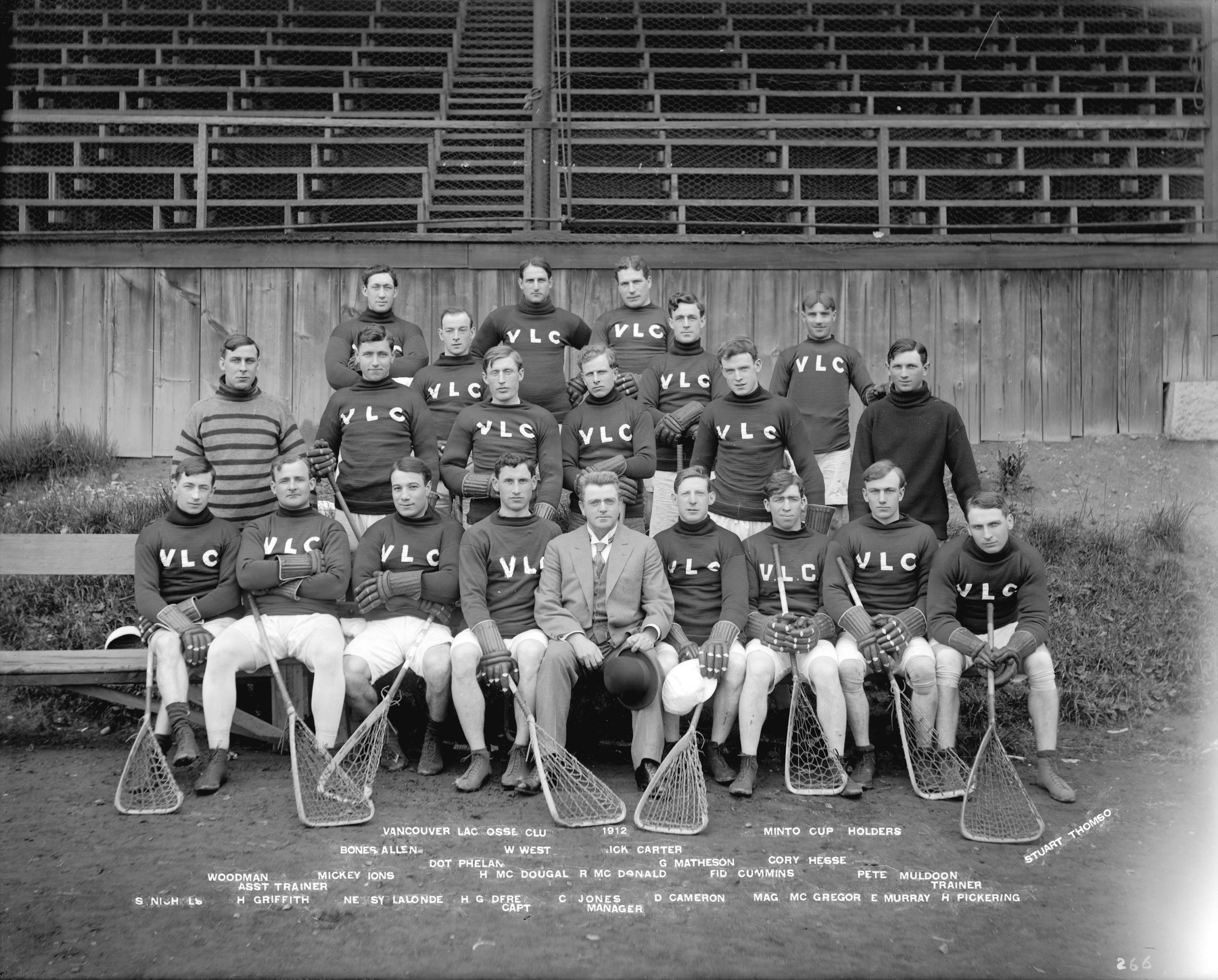
Ran McDonald, fourth from left in the middle row, with the Vancouver Lacrosse Club in 1912.

Ranald "Ran" John McDonald (November 21, 1889 – January 29, 1950) was a Canadian professional ice hockey player who played 159 games in various professional and amateur leagues, including the Pacific Coast Hockey Association (PCHA). Among the teams he played with were the New Westminster Royals, Portland Rosebuds, Victoria Aristocrats, and Spokane Canaries.

He also played lacrosse with the Vancouver Lacrosse Club.

== Playing career ==
Born in Cashion's Glen, Ontario, McDonald played for various senior teams in Fort William, Ontario, and Port Arthur, Ontario, before joining the new New Westminster Royals of the PCHA. He was named to the league's first all-star team in 1912, 1913, and 1914. McDonald played eight seasons in all in the PCHA before 1919. He played in the ill-fated 1919 Stanley Cup Final, cancelled after five games due to the Spanish flu pandemic, and played one more season in 1920–21 with the Edmonton Dominions of the Big Four League before retiring.

== Statistics ==
			Regular season					Playoffs
Season	Team	League	GP	G	A	Pts	PIM	GP	G	A	Pts	PIM
1907–08	Fort William Arenas	NOHL	1	0	0	0	0	–	–	–	–	–
1908–09	Fort William Forts	NOHL	12	6	0	6	–	2	0	0	0	–
1909–10	Fort William Forts	NOHL	10	12	0	12	50	–	–	–	–	–
1910–11	Port Arthur North Stars	NOHL	7	8	0	8	6	–	–	–	–	–
1912	New Westminster Royals	PCHA	15	16	0	16	56	–	–	–	–	–
1912–13	New Westminster Royals	PCHA	12	11	3	14	29	–	–	–	–	–
1913–14	New Westminster Royals	PCHA	16	15	5	20	34	–	–	–	–	–
1914–15	Portland Rosebuds	PCHA	18	22	7	29	24	–	–	–	–	–
1915–16	Victoria Aristocrats	PCHA	16	10	3	13	32	–	–	–	–	–
1916–17	Spokane Canaries	PCHA	23	13	9	22	23	—	—	—	—	—
1917–18	Vancouver Millionaires	PCHA	18	3	6	9	32	–	–	–	–	–
		Stanley Cup	–	–	–	–	–	3	2	1	3	9
1919	Seattle Metropolitans	PCHA	11	2	1	3	6	2	1	1	2	3
		Stanley Cup	–	–	–	–	–	5	1	1	2	3
1920–21	Edmonton Dominions	Big-4 League	4	2	1	3	2	–	–	–	–	–
NOHL totals			30	26	0	26	56	2	0	0	0	0
PCHA totals			129	92	34	126	236	2	1	1	2	3
Stanley Cup totals			–	–	–	–	–	8	3	2	5	12
