= 1912 PCHA season =

Canadian pro ice hockey league season

- League: Pacific Coast Hockey Association
- Sport: ice hockey
- Duration: January 2, 1912–March 19, 1912
- Number of teams: 3

Results
- Champion: New Westminster Royals
- Top scorer: Newsy Lalonde (Vancouver)

PCHA seasons
- 1912–13 →

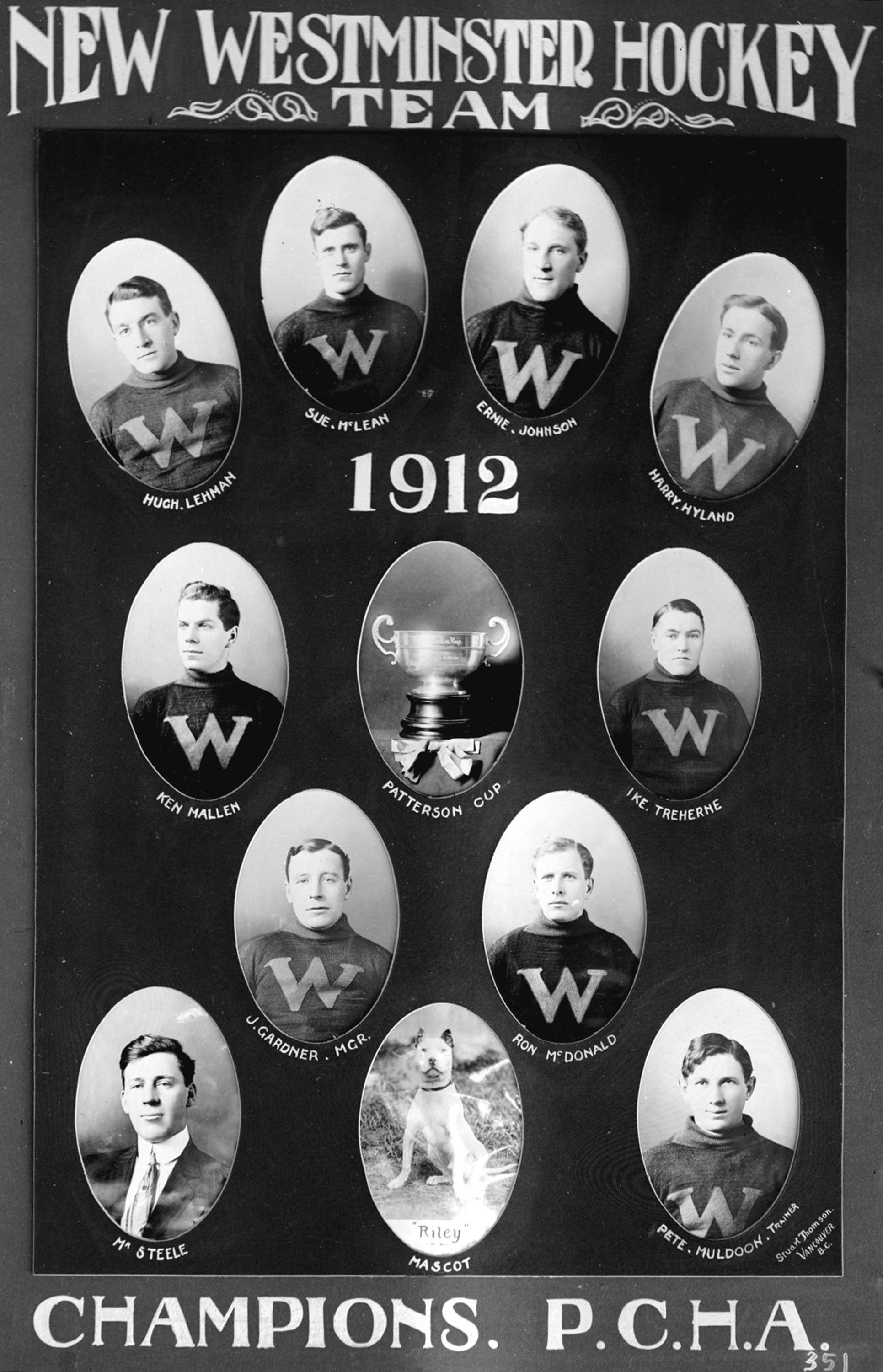
New Westminster Royals, 1912 PCHA champions.

The 1912 PCHA season was the first season of the now defunct men's professional ice hockey Pacific Coast Hockey Association (PCHA), a league founded on December 7, 1911. The three teams, all based in British Columbia, Canada, were to play a sixteen-game schedule, but one game was cancelled. The season ran from January 2 to March 19, 2012, ending with the New Westminster Royals as the first PCHA champions. In February, the PCHA had issued a challenge to the two-year-old National Hockey Association (NHA) to have the two leagues' champions play a series for the Stanley Cup, but the season ended too late for the Royals to travel east to face the NHA champion Quebec Bulldogs, who retained the Stanley Cup without further challenge for the 1911–12 season.

The season was not profitable. Frank Patrick, captain of the Vancouver Millionaires and director of the Vancouver Arena Company, was interviewed on March 6, 1912, by The Globe and expressed his hopes that the 1912–13 PCHA season, with an expected new team in Seattle, would provide better financial results. As it turned out, the PCHA did not expand beyond three teams until 1915–16, when the Seattle Metropolitans started operations.

== Teams ==
1912 Pacific Coast Hockey Association
Team	City	Arena	Capacity
New Westminster Royals	Vancouver, British Columbia	Denman Arena	10,500
Vancouver Millionaires	Vancouver, British Columbia	Denman Arena	10,500
Victoria Senators	Victoria, British Columbia	Patrick Arena	4,000

=== Map of teams ===
PCHA Teams

== Regular season ==
Most of the players for the league were recruited from the east. Many players joined the PCHA from the National Hockey Association (NHA), including Tom Dunderdale, Jimmy Gardner, Pud Glass, Newsy Lalonde, Bert Lindsay, Tommy Phillips and Skinner Poulin. Frank and Lester Patrick had actively targeted the NHA for players as British Columbia had a smaller base of players. In the previous season, the NHA had imposed maximums on player salaries and a salary cap per team that were extremely unpopular with players. Goaltender Hughie Lehman was signed from Berlin of the Ontario Professional Hockey League (OPHL).

The PCHA played seven-man rules with a rover, while the NHA experimented with six-man rules.

=== Final standings ===
Note: W = Wins, L = Losses, T = Ties, GF= Goals For, GA = Goals against

Pacific Coast Hockey Association	GP	W	L	T	GF	GA
New Westminster Royals	15	9	6	0	78	77
Vancouver Millionaires	15	7	8	0	102	94
Victoria Senators	16	7	9	0	81	90

== Schedule and results ==
Month	Day	Visitor	Score	Home	Score
Jan.	2	New Westminster	8	Victoria	3
Jan.	5	Vancouver	8	New Westminster	3
Jan.	9	Victoria	8	Vancouver	4
Jan.	12	Vancouver	7	Victoria	10
Jan.	16	Victoria	3	New Westminster	4 (OT 7'30")
Jan.	19	New Westminster	6	Vancouver	4
Jan.	23	New Westminster	2	Victoria	3
Jan.	26	Victoria	8	Vancouver	10
Jan.	30	Victoria	2	New Westminster	5
Feb.	2†	Vancouver	7	New Westminster	6 (OT 3'30")
Feb.	6	Vancouver	11	New Westminster	6
Feb.	9	Vancouver	7	Victoria	8 (OT 7'15")
Feb.	13	Victoria	6	Vancouver	4
Feb.	16	New Westminster	4	Victoria	2
Feb.	20	New Westminster	2	Vancouver	9
Feb.	23	Victoria	3	New Westminster	4
Feb.	27	Vancouver	7	Victoria	3
Mar.	1	Victoria	7	Vancouver	3
Mar.	5	New Westminster	6	Vancouver	10
Mar.	8	New Westminster	5	Victoria	1
Mar.	12	Victoria	6	New Westminster	10
Mar.	15	Vancouver	6	Victoria	8
Mar.	19	New Westminster	7	Vancouver	5

† Played in Victoria

A game between Vancouver and New Westminster was cancelled at the end of the season.

== Player statistics ==
=== Scoring leaders ===
Player	Team	GP	G	PIM
Newsy Lalonde	Vancouver Millionaires	15	27	51
Harry Hyland	New Westminster Royals	15	26	44
Tommy Dunderdale	Victoria Senators	16	24	25
Frank Patrick	Vancouver Millionaires	15	23	0
Don Smith	Victoria Aristocrats	16	19	22
Sibby Nichols	Vancouver Millionaires	15	19	35
Tommy Phillips	Vancouver Millionaires	17	17	38
Ran McDonald	New Westminster Royals	15	16	56
Ken Mallen	New Westminster Royals	13	14	30
Lester Patrick	Victoria Senators	16	10	9
Bobby Rowe	Victoria Senators	16	10	62

=== Goaltending averages ===
Note: GP = games played, GA = goals against, SO = shutouts, GAA = Goals against average

Name	Club	GP	GA	SO	GAA
Hughie Lehman	New Westminster	15	77		5.1
Bert Lindsay	Victoria	16	90		5.6
Allan Parr	Vancouver	15	94		6.3

== See also ==
- Pacific Coast Hockey Association
- List of pre-NHL seasons
- 1912 in sports
