= Ken Mallen =

Canadian ice hockey player (1884–1930)

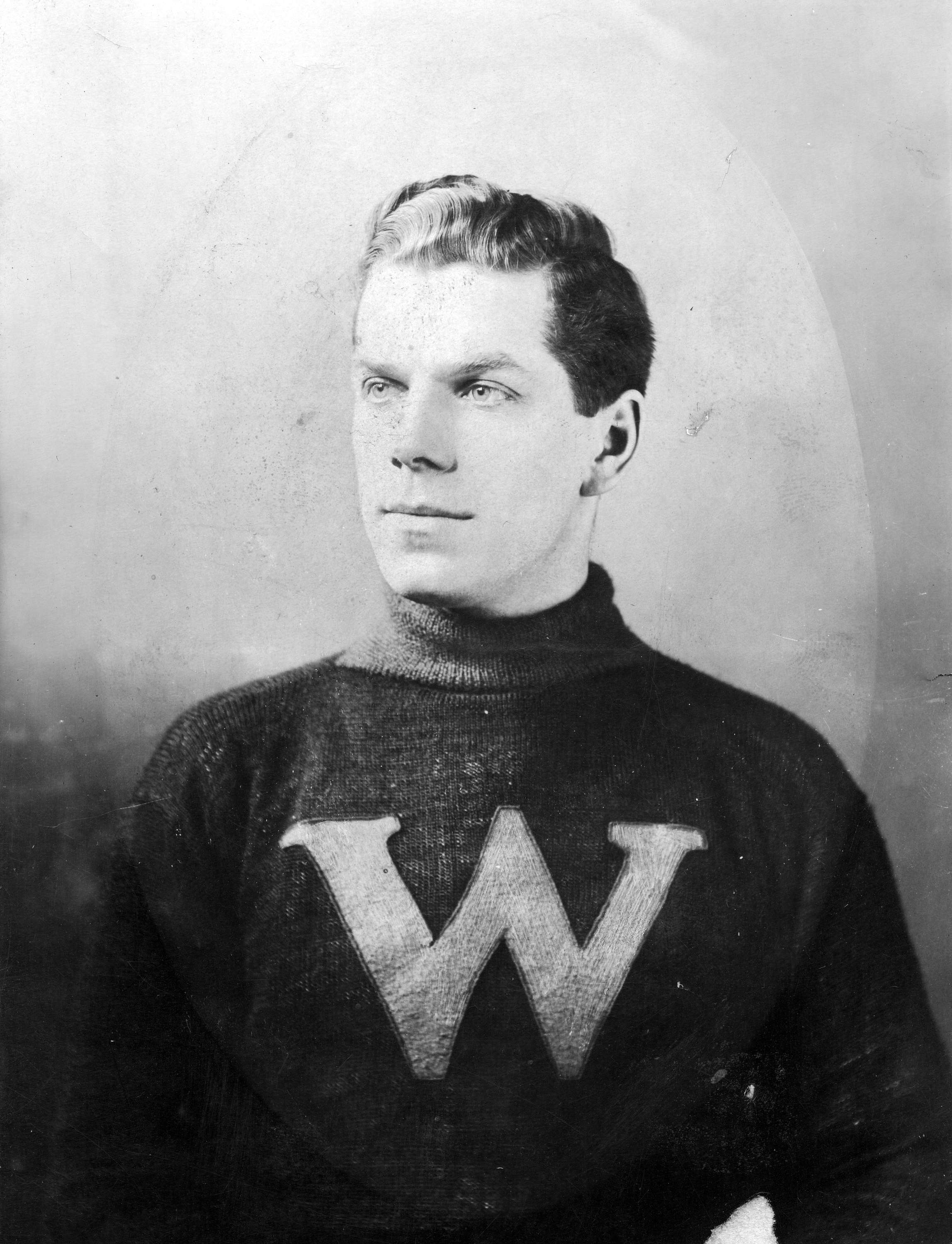
- Ken Mallen with the New Westminster Royals in 1912.
- Born: October 4, 1884 Morrisburg, Ontario
- Died: April 23, 1930 (aged 45) Morrisburg, Ontario
- Height: 5 ft 8 in (173 cm)
- Weight: 160 lb (73 kg; 11 st 6 lb)
- Position: Right wing
- Shot: Left
- Played for: Cornwall Kolts; Montreal Wanderers; Calumet Miners; Morrisburg Athletics; Toronto Professionals; Montreal AAA; Pittsburgh Athletic Club; Renfrew Creamery Kings; Ottawa Senators; Quebec Bulldogs; New Westminster Royals; Vancouver Millionaires; Victoria Aristocrats; Spokane Canaries
- Playing career: 1903–1917

William Kenneth Russell Mallen (October 4, 1884 – April 23, 1930) was a Canadian professional ice hockey player. He won two Stanley Cups in his career, in 1910 with the Ottawa Senators, and in 1915 with the Vancouver Millionaires. Mallen played over 150 games in his career.

== Playing career ==
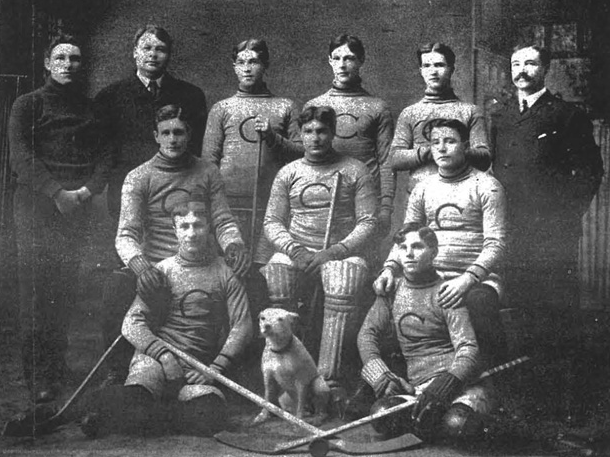
Ken Mallen, bottom right, with the 1904–05 Calumet Miners.

Born in Morrisburg, Ontario, Mallen played one season with Cornwall of the Federal Amateur Hockey League (FAHL) before turning professional with the Calumet Miners of the International Professional Hockey League (IPHL) in 1904. His first season, he scored 38 goals in 24 games to establish a goal-scorer's reputation. He left the IPHL because of the rough play in December 1905, returning to the FAHL, although he returned to Calumet for one final season in 1907.

Mallen played in 1907–08 with Toronto of the Ontario Professional Hockey League and the Montreal Hockey Club, then played another season in the United States for the Pittsburgh Athletic Club of the Western Pennsylvania Hockey League (WPHL). Mallen continued his team-hopping ways, playing in Ottawa from December 1909 until December 1910, then the Quebec Bulldogs in 1910–11, before moving out west to play in the Pacific Coast Hockey Association (PCHA), where he played three seasons with the New Westminster Royals, one with the Vancouver Millionaires, one with the Victoria Aristocrats and one with the Spokane Canaries before retiring in 1917.

His older brother Jim Mallen was also a professional ice hockey player and the two brothers played on the same Calumet Miners team in the 1905–06 and 1906–07 seasons.

== Playing style ==
Ken Mallen was known as one of the speediest players of his era and he was also a capable goal scorer. During the 1912–13 PCHA season Mallen won a speed skating contest against fellow PCHA players Moose Johnson, Si Griffis and Cyclone Taylor, all of them considered to be among the quickest players in the game at the time. Mallen played both as a winger and as a rover during his career.

== Post career ==
After retiring from hockey, Mallen worked as a referee and a skating instructor, teaching speed-skating in Ottawa and skating for the London, Ontario Skating Club.

== Statistics ==
			Regular season					Playoffs
Season	Team	League	GP	G	A	Pts	PIM	GP	G	A	Pts	PIM
1904	Cornwall Hockey Club	FAHL	4	9	0	9	0	–	–	–	–	–
1904	Montreal Wanderers	FAHL	2	1	0	2	0	1	1	0	1	0
1904–05	Calumet Miners	IPHL	24	38	0	38	8	–	–	–	–	–
1905–06	Calumet Miners	IPHL	5	4	0	4	7	–	–	–	–	–
1906–07	Calumet Miners	IPHL	11	13	2	15	12	–	–	–	–	–
1906–07	Morrisburg Athletics	FAHL	5	6	0	6	6	–	–	–	–	–
1907–08	Toronto Professionals	OPHL	3	2	0	2	0	–	–	–	–	–
1907–08	Montreal AAA	ECAHA	7	10	0	10	8	–	–	–	–	–
1908–09	Pittsburgh Athletic Club	WPHL	10	12	0	12	–	–	–	–	–	–
1908–09	Renfrew Creamery Kings	FAHL	3	4	0	4	2	–	–	–	–	–
1909–10	Ottawa Senators	CHA	1	2	0	2	0	–	–	–	–	–
1910	Ottawa Senators	NHA	1	2	0	2	3	–	–	–	–	–
1910–11	Quebec Bulldogs	NHA	12	13	0	13	15	–	–	–	–	–
1912	New Westminster Royals	PCHA	13	14	0	14	30	–	–	–	–	–
1912–13	New Westminster Royals	PCHA	10	4	3	7	28	–	–	–	–	–
1913–14	New Westminster Royals	PCHA	16	20	6	26	46	–	–	–	–	–
1914–15	Vancouver Millionaires	PCHA	14	9	5	14	45	–	–	–	–	–
1914–15	Vancouver Millionaires	St-Cup	–	–	–	–	–	2	0	0	0	0
1915–16	Victoria Aristocrats	PCHA	18	7	5	12	31	–	–	–	–	–
1916–17	Spokane Canaries	PCHA	23	10	3	13	24	–	–	–	–	–
IPHL totals			40	55	2	57	27	–	–	–	–	–
PCHA totals			94	64	22	86	204	–	–	–	–	–
NHA totals			13	15	0	15	18	–	–	–	–	–
