= Allan Parr =

Canadian ice hockey player

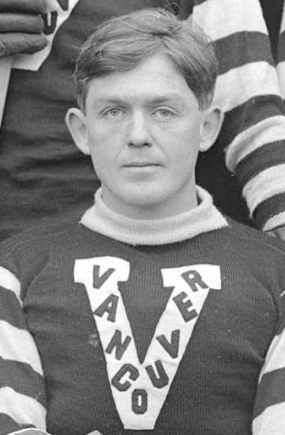
- Parr with the 1913–14 Vancouver Millionaires.
- Born: August 16, 1879 Ottawa, Ontario, Canada
- Died: July 7, 1954 (aged 74) Vancouver, British Columbia, Canada
- Height: 5 ft 6 in (168 cm)
- Weight: 150 lb (68 kg; 10 st 10 lb)
- Position: Goaltender
- Played for: Vancouver Millionaires
- Playing career: 1906–1914

Allan Gordon Parr (August 16, 1879 – July 7, 1954) was a Canadian professional ice hockey goaltender. He played for the Vancouver Millionaires of the Pacific Coast Hockey Association from 1911 to 1914. He later worked as an electrician. He died of heart disease in Vancouver in 1954.
