= 1922–23 PCHA season =

Professional ice hockey league season

- League: Pacific Coast Hockey Association
- Sport: Ice hockey
- Duration: November 13, 1922–March 2, 1923
- Number of teams: 3

Regular season
- League leader: Vancouver Maroons
- Top scorer: Frank Fredrickson (Victoria)

Playoffs
- Champions: Vancouver Maroons
- Runners-up: Victoria Cougars

PCHA seasons
- ← 1921–22 1923–24 →

The 1922–23 PCHA season was the 12th season of the professional men's ice hockey Pacific Coast Hockey Association league. Season play ran from November 13, 1922, until March 2, 1923. The Vancouver Maroons club would be regular-season PCHA champions, and won the play-off with Victoria Aristocrats.

== League business ==
The league finally dropped the position of rover, adopting the six-man hockey of the National Hockey League (NHL), eleven years after the National Hockey Association (NHA) dropped it.

The Vancouver Millionaires were renamed the Maroons, and the Victoria Aristocrats were renamed the Cougars. The season was increased to 30 games per team, including eight games against Western Canada Hockey League (WCHL) teams.

Vancouver acquired Corbett Denneny from Toronto for Jack Adams and signed Frank Boucher from Ottawa.

Frank Fredrickson had an outstanding season, scoring 41 goals in thirty games.

== Teams ==
1922–23 Pacific Coast Hockey Association
Team	City	Arena	Capacity
Seattle Metropolitans	Seattle, Washington	Seattle Ice Arena	4,000
Vancouver Maroons	Vancouver, British Columbia	Denman Arena	10,500
Victoria Cougars	Victoria, British Columbia	Patrick Arena	4,000

=== Map of teams ===
PCHA Teams

== Regular season ==
Cyclone Taylor made the final appearance of his career on December 8 at Victoria.

=== Final standings ===
The standings include the interlocking games. Note: W = Wins, L = Losses, T = Ties, GF= Goals For, GA = Goals against
Teams that qualified for the playoffs are highlighted in bold

Pacific Coast Hockey Association	GP	W	L	T	GF	GA
**Vancouver Maroons**	29	16	12	1	112	82
**Victoria Cougars**	29	16	13	0	89	81
Seattle Metropolitans	30	15	15	0	101	108

== Playoffs ==
The Maroons won the two-game total-goals series against Victoria 3-0, 2-3 (5-3)

The Maroons then played against the National Hockey League champion Ottawa in a best-of-five series for the right to play the WCHL champion for the Stanley Cup. Ottawa won the series 1-0, 1-4, 3-2, 5-1 (3-1).

== Schedule and results ==
Month	Day	Visitor	Score	Home	Score
Nov	13	Seattle	8	Vancouver	2
Nov	15	Victoria	0	Seattle	4
Nov	17	Vancouver	3	Victoria	5
Nov	20	Victoria	4	Vancouver	3
Nov	22	Vancouver	5	Seattle	2
Nov	24	Seattle	6	Victoria	4
Nov	27	Seattle	8	Vancouver	4
Nov	29	Victoria	4	Seattle	5 (OT 16"47")
Dec	8	Vancouver	4	Victoria	3
Dec	11	Victoria	1	Vancouver	2
Dec	13	Vancouver	2	Seattle	3 (OT 10')
Dec	15	Seattle	1	Victoria	2
Dec	18	Regina	3	Vancouver	10
Dec	20	Regina	6	Seattle	5 (OT 9')
Dec	22	Regina	3	Victoria	2
Dec	25	Seattle	0	Vancouver	4
Dec	27	Vancouver	4	Seattle	3
Dec	29	Vancouver	3	Victoria	4
Jan	1	Victoria	2	Vancouver	1 (OT 8'20")
Jan	3	Victoria	1	Seattle	0
Jan	3	Vancouver	0	Calgary	1 (OT 7'40")
Jan	5	Seattle	1	Victoria	5
Jan	5	Vancouver	5	Edmonton	1
Jan	8	Seattle	2	Victoria	0*
Jan	8	Vancouver	3	Saskatoon	0
Jan	10	Calgary	0	Seattle	4
Jan	10	Vancouver	2	Regina	6
Jan	12	Calgary	0	Victoria	4
Jan	15	Calgary	0	Vancouver	4
Jan	17	Vancouver	2	Seattle	1
Jan	19	Vancouver	2	Victoria	3 (OT 8')
Jan	19	Seattle	4	Calgary	3 (OT 2'35")
Jan	22	Victoria	1	Vancouver	4
Jan	22	Seattle	3	Edmonton	2
Jan	24	Victoria	4	Vancouver	8‡
Jan	24	Seattle	4	Saskatoon	2
Jan	26	Seattle	2	Regina	6
Jan	27	Saskatoon	2	Victoria	5
Jan	29	Saskatoon	6	Vancouver	6 (OT 20')
Jan	31	Saskatoon	1	Seattle	7
Feb	2	Vancouver	4	Victoria	3 (OT 11')†
Feb	5	Seattle	0	Vancouver	4
Feb	7	Victoria	2	Seattle	5
Feb	9	Seattle	1	Victoria	6
Feb	12	Victoria	3	Vancouver	5
Feb	15	Edmonton	4	Seattle	3
Feb	16	Edmonton	0	Victoria	4
Feb	19	Edmonton	2	Vancouver	1
Feb	19	Victoria	2	Regina	1
Feb	21	Vancouver	3	Seattle	6
Feb	21	Victoria	1	Saskatoon	0
Feb	23	Seattle	2	Vancouver	4††
Feb	23	Victoria	5	Edmonton	4
Feb	26	Seattle	3	Vancouver	12
Feb	26	Victoria	2	Calgary	4
Feb	28	Victoria	3	Seattle	5
Mar	2	Seattle	2	Victoria	9

‡ at Seattle.

† The results of this game were stricken from the record after a Victoria protest. The game was to be replayed on March 5 if it would affect the standings.

†† at Victoria.

* at Vancouver.

Source: Coleman(1966).

== Player statistics ==
=== Scoring leaders ===
Player	Team	GP	G	A	Pts	PIM
Frank Fredrickson	Victoria Cougars	30	39	16	55	26
Mickey MacKay	Vancouver Maroons	30	28	12	40	38
Lloyd Cook	Vancouver Maroons	30	19	11	30	33
Frank Foyston	Seattle Metropolitans	30	20	8	28	21
Jim Riley	Seattle Metropolitans	30	23	4	27	70
Bernie Morris	Seattle Metropolitans	29	21	5	26	30
Harry Meeking	Victoria Cougars	28	17	9	26	39
Jack Walker	Seattle Metropolitans	29	13	10	23	4
Clem Loughlin	Victoria Cougars	30	12	10	22	24
Art Duncan	Vancouver Maroons	25	15	6	21	8

=== Goaltending averages ===
Name	Club	GP	GA	SO	Avg.
Hugh Lehman	Vancouver	25	61	4	2.4
Hec Fowler	Victoria	30	85	4	2.8
Hap Holmes	Seattle	30	106	3	3.5
Charlie Reid	Vancouver	5	27		5.4

== See also ==
- Pacific Coast Hockey Association
- 1922 in sports
- 1923 in sports
