= 1921–22 PCHA season =

Professional ice hockey league season

- League: Pacific Coast Hockey Association
- Sport: Ice hockey
- Duration: December 5, 1921–February 24, 1922
- Number of teams: 3

Regular season
- League leader: Seattle Metropolitans
- Top scorer: Jack Adams (Vancouver)

Playoffs
- Champions: Vancouver Millionaires
- Runners-up: Seattle Metropolitans

PCHA seasons
- ← 1920–21 1922–23 →

The 1921–22 PCHA season was the 11th season of the professional men's ice hockey Pacific Coast Hockey Association league. Season play ran from December 5, 1921, until February 24, 1922. The season was enlarged to 24 games per team. The Seattle Metropolitans were the regular-season PCHA champions, but lost the play-off with Vancouver Millionaires.

== League business ==
The league introduced the penalty shot rule this season to counter deliberate fouls when a player had a clear goal-scoring opportunity. Three dots, 35 feet from each net were painted on the ice from which players would shoot on the goalkeeper.

Play started two weeks earlier to accommodate the playoffs against the Western Canada Hockey League (WCHL).

== Teams ==
1921–22 Pacific Coast Hockey Association
Team	City	Arena	Capacity
Seattle Metropolitans	Seattle, Washington	Seattle Ice Arena	4,000
Vancouver Millionaires	Vancouver, British Columbia	Denman Arena	10,500
Victoria Aristocrats	Victoria, British Columbia	Patrick Arena	4,000

=== Map of teams ===
PCHA Teams

== Regular season ==
Lester Patrick twice subbed for goaltender Norman "Hec" Fowler when Fowler was sent off for fighting. His style of getting to his knees to make a save earned him the nickname of the Praying Colonel.

Ernie "Moose" Johnson played the last game in his career on January 18. He scored the final goal in his career on January 13.

Frank Foyston had the best one-game performance of the season, scoring five goals against Vancouver on January 11. Jack Adams though led the league in scoring with 25 goals in 24 games.

=== Final standings ===
Note: W = Wins, L = Losses, T = Ties, GF= Goals For, GA = Goals against
Teams that qualified for the playoffs are highlighted in bold

Pacific Coast Hockey Association	GP	W	L	T	GF	GA
**Seattle Metropolitans**	24	12	11	1	65	64
**Vancouver Millionaires**	24	12	12	0	77	68
Victoria Aristocrats	24	11	12	1	61	71

Source: Coleman(1966).

== Playoffs ==
The Millionaires won the two-game total-goals series against Seattle 1-0, 1-0 (2-0)

The Millionaires then played against the Western Canada Hockey League champion Regina in a two-game total-goals series for the right to play the NHL champion. Vancouver won the series 1-2, 4-0 (5-2).

The Millionaires then played the Toronto St. Pats in the 1922 Stanley Cup Finals. The St. Pats won the best-of-five series three games to two to win their second Stanley Cup and the only one while the team was named the St. Pats. Five years later the St. Pats were renamed as the Toronto Maple Leafs.

== Schedule and results ==
Month	Day	Visitor	Score	Home	Score
Dec	5	Seattle	1	Vancouver	2
Dec	7	Victoria	4	Seattle	1
Dec	9	Seattle	1	Victoria	1 (OT 20')
Dec	12	Victoria	2	Vancouver	0
Dec	14	Vancouver	4	Seattle	5
Dec	16	Vancouver	3	Victoria	4
Dec	19	Seattle	2	Vancouver	1
Dec	21	Victoria	1	Seattle	2
Dec	23	Seattle	3	Victoria	2 (OT 1'15")
Dec	26	Victoria	2	Vancouver	3
Dec	28	Vancouver	5	Seattle	0
Dec	30	Vancouver	5	Victoria	3
Jan	2	Seattle	0	Vancouver	5
Jan	4	Victoria	4	Seattle	3 (OT 14'34")
Jan	6	Vancouver	2	Victoria	5
Jan	9	Victoria	0	Vancouver	4
Jan	11	Vancouver	2	Seattle	5
Jan	13	Seattle	2	Victoria	5
Jan	16	Seattle	3	Vancouver	10
Jan	18	Victoria	4	Seattle	3
Jan	20	Vancouver	4	Victoria	3 (OT 5'22")
Jan	23	Victoria	5	Vancouver	4
Jan	25	Vancouver	3	Seattle	4
Jan	27	Seattle	4	Victoria	0
Jan	30	Seattle	2	Vancouver	3 (OT 3'03")
Feb	1	Victoria	1	Seattle	3
Feb	3	Vancouver	1	Victoria	2
Feb	6	Victoria	2	Vancouver	3
Feb	8	Vancouver	0	Seattle	3
Feb	10	Seattle	2	Victoria	0
Feb	13	Seattle	0	Vancouver	2
Feb	15	Victoria	0	Seattle	7
Feb	17	Seattle	2	Victoria	3
Feb	20	Victoria	1	Vancouver	5
Feb	22	Vancouver	2	Seattle	7
Feb	24	Vancouver	4	Victoria	7

Source: Coleman(1966).

== Player statistics ==
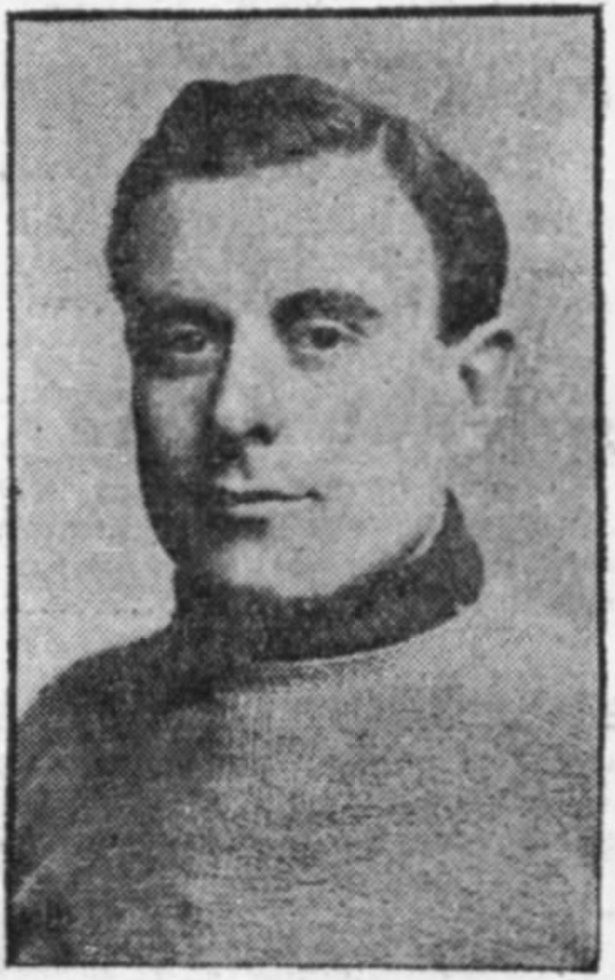
Victoria Aristocrats goaltender Norman "Hec" Fowler.

=== Scoring leaders ===
Player	Team	GP	G	A	Pts	PIM
Jack Adams	Vancouver Millionaires	24	26	4	30	24
Mickey MacKay	Vancouver Millionaires	24	14	12	26	20
Frank Fredrickson	Victoria Aristocrats	24	15	10	25	26
Bernie Morris	Seattle Metropolitans	24	14	10	24	36
Frank Foyston	Seattle Metropolitans	24	16	7	23	25
Tommy Dunderdale	Victoria Aristocrats	24	13	6	19	37
Jim Riley	Seattle Metropolitans	24	16	2	18	27
Eddie Oatman	Victoria Aristocrats	21	9	6	15	28
Smokey Harris	Vancouver Millionaires	23	10	4	14	21
Art Duncan	Vancouver Millionaires	24	5	9	14	25

=== Goaltending averages ===
Name	Club	GP	GA	SO	Avg.
Hap Holmes	Seattle	24	64	4	2.7
Hugh Lehman	Vancouver	22	62	4	2.8
Hec Fowler	Victoria	24	70		2.9
Tommy Murray	Vancouver	2	6		3.0
Lester Patrick	Victoria	2	1		0.5

Source: Coleman(1966).

== See also ==
- 1921–22 NHL season
- 1921–22 WCHL season
