= 1919–20 PCHA season =

Can-Am pro ice hockey league season

- League: Pacific Coast Hockey Association
- Sport: Ice hockey
- Duration: December 29, 1919–March 10, 1920
- Teams: 3

Regular season
- League leader: Seattle Metropolitans
- Top scorer: Tommy Dunderdale (Victoria)

Playoffs
- Champions: Seattle Metropolitans
- Runners-up: Vancouver Millionaires

PCHA seasons
- ← 1919 1920–21 →

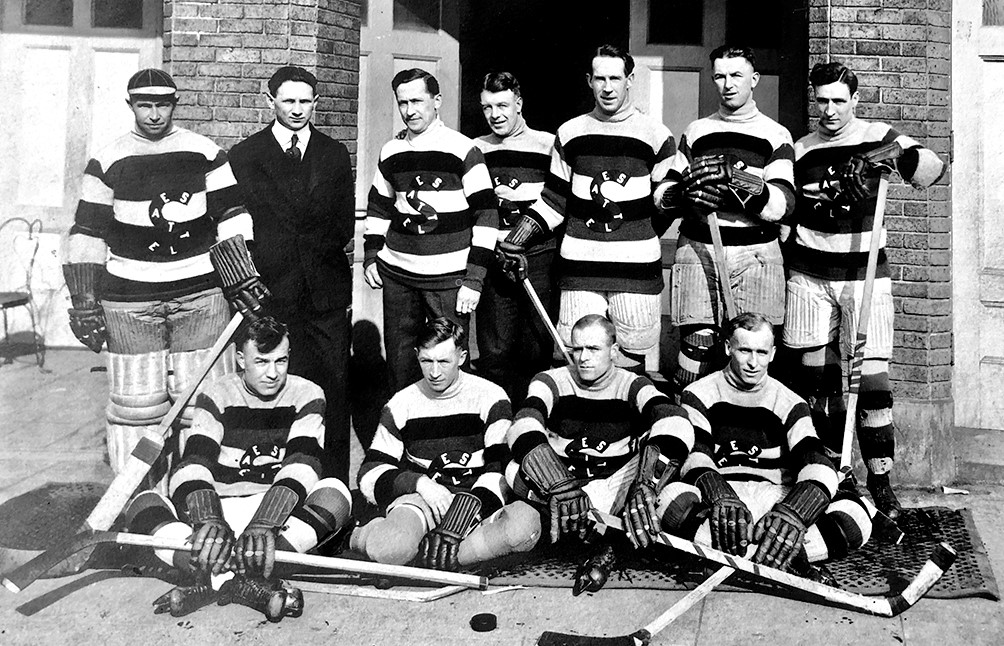
1920 Seattle Metropolitans

The 1919–20 PCHA season was the ninth season of the professional men's ice hockey Pacific Coast Hockey Association (PCHA) league. Season play ran from December 26, 1919, to March 10, 1920. The season was enlarged to 22 games per team. The Seattle Metropolitans club finished first during the regular season and then won the playoff with the Vancouver Millionaires to take the PCHA championship. The Mets then played in the 1920 Stanley Cup Final against the National Hockey League (NHL) champion Ottawa Senators. The Senators won the best-of-five series three games to two.

== League business ==
At the league's annual meeting on November 21, 1919, Frank Patrick was re-elected as PCHA president.

Several players retired, including Si Griffis, Barney Stanley, and Mickey MacKay of Vancouver, and Ran McDonald of Seattle. Three players from Stanley Cup champion Toronto of the NHL moved to the PCHA this season: Alf Skinner, Jack Adams, and Harry Meeking.

== Teams ==
1919–20 Pacific Coast Hockey Association
Team	City	Arena	Capacity
Seattle Metropolitans	Seattle, Washington	Seattle Ice Arena	4,000
Vancouver Millionaires	Vancouver, British Columbia	Denman Arena	10,500
Victoria Aristocrats	Victoria, British Columbia	Patrick Arena	4,000

=== Map of teams ===
PCHA Teams

== Regular season ==
=== Final standings ===
Note: W = Wins, L = Losses, T = Ties, GF= Goals For, GA = Goals against
Teams that qualified for the playoffs are highlighted in bold

Pacific Coast Hockey Association	GP	W	L	T	GF	GA
**Seattle Metropolitans**	22	12	10	0	59	55
**Vancouver Millionaires**	22	11	11	0	75	65
Victoria Aristocrats	22	10	12	0	57	71

== Schedule and results ==
Month	Day	Visitor	Score	Home	Score
Dec	26	Seattle	1	Victoria	2
Dec	29	Victoria	3	Vancouver	4 (OT 0'24")
Dec	31	Vancouver	2	Seattle	3
Jan	2	Vancouver	4	Victoria	7
Jan	5	Seattle	2	Vancouver	3
Jan	7	Victoria	2	Seattle	5
Jan	9	Seattle	0	Victoria	2
Jan	12	Victoria	4	Vancouver	3
Jan	14	Vancouver	3	Seattle	1
Jan	16	Vancouver	2	Victoria	1
Jan	19	Seattle	5	Vancouver	2
Jan	21	Victoria	1	Seattle	3
Jan	23	Vancouver	1	Victoria	4
Jan	26	Victoria	5	Vancouver	7
Jan	28	Vancouver	3	Seattle	4 (OT 3'59")
Jan	30	Seattle	4	Victoria	2
Feb	2	Seattle	3	Vancouver	4 (OT 3'40")
Feb	4	Victoria	0	Seattle	3
Feb	6	Vancouver	3	Victoria	1
Feb	9	Victoria	3	Vancouver	2
Feb	11	Vancouver	4	Seattle	2
Feb	13	Seattle	1	Victoria	6
Feb	16	Seattle	3	Vancouver	2
Feb	18	Victoria	0	Seattle	6
Feb	20	Vancouver	1	Victoria	3
Feb	23	Victoria	4	Vancouver	10
Feb	25	Vancouver	8	Seattle	0
Feb	27	Seattle	2	Victoria	3 (OT 7'04")
Mar	1	Seattle	2	Vancouver	5
Mar	3	Victoria	0	Seattle	2
Mar	5	Vancouver	2	Victoria	3
Mar	8	Seattle	2	Vancouver	0
Mar	10	Victoria	1	Seattle	5

Source: Coleman (1966)

== Player statistics ==
=== Scoring leaders ===
Player	Team	GP	G	A	Pts	PIM
Tommy Dunderdale	Victoria Aristocrats	22	26	7	33	35
Frank Foyston	Seattle Metropolitans	22	26	3	29	3
Smokey Harris	Vancouver Millionaires	22	14	11	25	12
Eddie Oatman	Victoria Aristocrats	22	11	14	25	38
Gordon Roberts	Vancouver Millionaires	22	16	3	19	13
Alf Skinner	Vancouver Millionaires	22	15	2	17	28
Jim Riley	Seattle Metropolitans	22	11	4	15	49
Charles Tobin	Seattle Metropolitans	19	10	4	14	3
Lloyd Cook	Vancouver Millionaires	21	10	4	14	15
Art Duncan	Vancouver Millionaires	22	5	9	14	3

Source: Toronto World, March 19, 1920.

=== Goaltending averages ===
Name	Club	GP	GA	SO	Avg.
Hap Holmes	Seattle	22	55	4	2.2
Hughie Lehman	Vancouver	22	65	1	3.0
Hec Fowler	Victoria	22	71	1	3.2

== Playoffs ==
Seattle and Vancouver met for the third straight year in the playoffs to decide the PCHA championship. Vancouver won the first game 3–0 at Seattle, but Seattle struck back in Vancouver, defeating the Millionaires 6–0 to win the championship and advance to the Stanley Cup Final in Ottawa. Gordon Roberts of Vancouver played his last professional game in the first game and scored a goal.

Date	Home	Score	Away	Score
March 12	Seattle	1	**Vancouver**	**3**
March 15	Vancouver	0	**Seattle**	**6**

Source: Coleman (1966)

=== Stanley Cup Final ===
Ottawa won the first two games of the series. After Jack Darragh scored the game-winning goal in their 3–2 victory in game one, goaltender Clint Benedict led the Senators to a 3–0 shutout win in game two. Seattle won game three, 3–1, before the series was shifted to Toronto because of Ottawa's slushy ice conditions (the Ottawa Arena did not have artificial ice). Frank Foyston then scored twice to lead the Mets to a 5–2 victory in game four to even the series. In the fifth game, Darragh recorded a hat-trick to lead the Senators to a 6–1 win to clinch the Cup.

	Date	Winning team	Score	Losing team	Location
1	March 22	Ottawa Senators	3–2	Seattle Metropolitans	The Arena, Ottawa
2	March 24	Ottawa Senators	3–0	Seattle Metropolitans	The Arena, Ottawa
3	March 27	Seattle Metropolitans	3–1	Ottawa Senators	The Arena, Ottawa
4	March 30	Seattle Metropolitans	5–2	Ottawa Senators	Arena Gardens, Toronto
5	April 1	Ottawa Senators	6–1	Seattle Metropolitans	Arena Gardens, Toronto
Ottawa wins best-of-five series 3 games to 2

Source: Coleman (1966)

== See also ==
- 1919–20 NHL season
