= 1914–15 PCHA season =

Can-Am pro ice hockey league season

- League: Pacific Coast Hockey Association
- Sport: Ice hockey
- Duration: December 8, 1914–March 9, 1915
- Teams: 3

Results
- Champion: Vancouver Millionaires
- Top scorer: Cyclone Taylor (Vancouver)

PCHA seasons
- ← 1913–14 1915–16 →

The 1914–15 PCHA season was the fourth season of the professional men's ice hockey Pacific Coast Hockey Association league. Season play ran from December 8, 1914, until March 9, 1915. The schedule was made for each team to play 18 games, but like the previous three seasons, one game was cancelled. The Vancouver Millionaires club were the PCHA champions. After the season the club faced off against the Ottawa Senators, NHA champions for the Stanley Cup, winning the series and becoming the first west-coast team to win the Cup.

== League business ==
The franchise of the New Westminster Royals was transferred to Portland, Oregon, and renamed the "Rosebuds." The league established a "farm system" called the Boundary Hockey League in the British Columbia towns of Grand Forks, Greenwood and Phoenix.

Rule changes

The league banned body checking within 10 feet (3.0 m) of the boards.

== Teams ==
1914–15 Pacific Coast Hockey Association
Team	City	Arena	Capacity
Portland Rosebuds	Portland, Oregon	Portland Ice Arena	2,000
Vancouver Millionaires	Vancouver, British Columbia	Denman Arena	10,500
Victoria Aristocrats	Victoria, British Columbia	Patrick Arena	4,000

=== Map of teams ===
PCHA Teams

== Regular season ==
Rookie Mickey MacKay led the league with 33 goals, while Cyclone Taylor won the scoring title. The two led the Vancouver Millionaires to the league title, winning 13 of 17 games.

=== Final standings ===
Note: W = Wins, L = Losses, T = Ties, GF= Goals For, GA = Goals against

Pacific Coast Hockey Association	GP	W	L	T	GF	GA
Vancouver Millionaires	17	13	4	0	115	71
Portland Rosebuds	18	9	9	0	91	83
Victoria Aristocrats	17	4	13	0	64	116

=== Results ===
Month	Day	Visitor	Score	Home	Score
Dec.	8	Vancouver	6	Portland	3
Dec.	11	Victoria	3	Vancouver	5
Dec.	15	Portland	8	Victoria	4
Dec.	18	Portland	3	Vancouver	6
Dec.	26	Victoria	1	Portland	8
Dec.	29	Vancouver	4	Victoria	3 (OT 12'06")
Jan.	5	Vancouver	4	Portland	3 (OT 11'00")
Jan.	8	Victoria	2	Vancouver	9
Jan.	12	Portland	3	Victoria	4 (OT 3'35")
Jan.	15	Portland	3	Vancouver	2
Jan.	19	Victoria	5	Portland	10
Jan.	22	Vancouver	1	Victoria	4
Jan.	26	Vancouver	4	Portland	10
Jan.	29	Victoria	5	Vancouver	12
Feb.	2	Portland	5	Victoria	6 (OT 18'20")
Feb.	5	Portland	8	Vancouver	3
Feb.	9	Victoria	2	Portland	3
Feb.	12	Vancouver	6	Victoria	4
Feb.	16	Vancouver	5	Portland	0
Feb.	19	Victoria	3	Vancouver	10
Feb.	23	Portland	3	Victoria	4
Feb.	26	Portland	3	Vancouver	13
Feb.	27	Portland	3	Vancouver	11
Mar.	2	Vancouver	14	Victoria	11
Mar.	4	Victoria	1	Portland	9
Mar.	6	Victoria	2	Portland	6
Mar.	9^{a}	Victoria		Vancouver	

- ^{a} Cancelled

A game between Vancouver and Victoria was cancelled at the end of the season.

Source: Coleman, p. 271

== All-Star games ==
On March 15 and 17 two All-Star games were played in Portland between the league champions Vancouver Millionaires and a PCHA All-Star aggregation made out of players from the Portland Rosebuds and the Victoria Aristocrats. Vancouver won the first game at the Portland Ice Hippodrome 9 goals to 8, with Cyclone Taylor scoring four times for the winning side, and with Lester Patrick having an impressive five goals and three assists for the losing side, figuring in all of the All-Stars goals.

Vancouver managed to win also the second game by a one-goal margin, defeating the All-Stars 4 goals to 3. Frank Nighbor made a good showing for the winning side with two goals, and for the All-Stars Ran McDonald scored twice.

== Playoffs ==
The champion Vancouver Millionaires hosted the finals against the Ottawa Senators, NHA champions. Vancouver won the series and became the first west-coast team to win the Cup.

Game-by-Game		Winning team	Score	Losing team	Rules Used	Location
1	March 22	Vancouver Millionaires	6–2	Ottawa Senators	PCHA	Denman Arena, Vancouver
2	March 24	Vancouver Millionaires	8–3	Ottawa Senators	NHA	Denman Arena, Vancouver
3	March 26	Vancouver Millionaires	12–3	Ottawa Senators	PCHA	Denman Arena, Vancouver
Millionaires win best-of-five series 3 – 0

== Player statistics ==
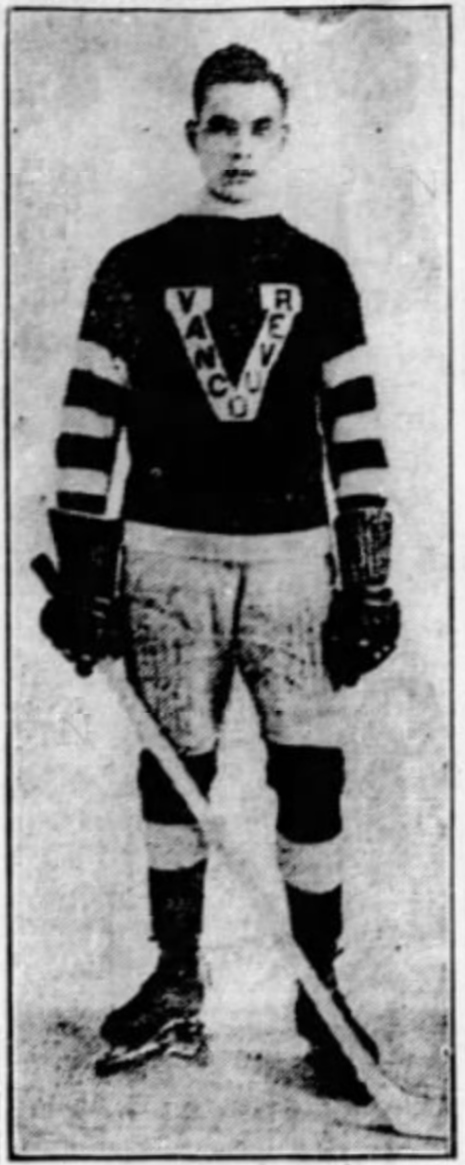
Frank Nighbor, tied third in points.

=== Scoring leaders ===
Player	Team	GP	G	A	Pts	PIM
Cyclone Taylor	Vancouver Millionaires	16	23	22	45	9
Mickey MacKay	Vancouver Millionaires	17	33	11	44	9
Frank Nighbor	Vancouver Millionaires	17	23	7	30	12
Eddie Oatman	Portland Rosebuds	18	22	8	30	23
Ran McDonald	Portland Rosebuds	18	22	7	29	24
Tommy Dunderdale	Victoria Aristocrats	16	17	10	27	22
Art Throop	Portland Rosebuds	18	16	8	24	43
Dubbie Kerr	Victoria Aristocrats	17	14	4	18	15
Smokey Harris	Portland Rosebuds	18	14	3	17	39
Lester Patrick	sVictoria Aristocrats	17	12	5	17	15

=== Goaltending averages ===
Name	Club	GP	GA	SO	Avg.
Hugh Lehman	Vancouver	17	71	1	4.2
Mike Mitchell	Portland	18	83		4.6
Bert Lindsay	Victoria	17	116		6.8

== Vancouver Millionaires 1915 Stanley Cup champions ==
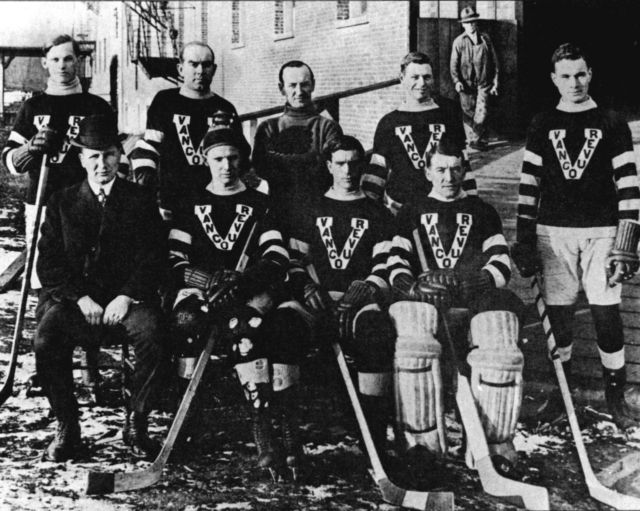
1915 Vancouver Millionaires

=== Players ===
Centres

Wingers

- Russell Barney Stanley
- Frank Nighbor

Defencemen

- Lloyd Cook
- Silas Griffis (captain)
- Frank Patrick (president/manager/coach/defence)
- Jim Seaborn
- Ken Mallen

Goaltenders

- Hugh Lehman

=== Coaching and administrative staff ===
- None - Defenseman Frank Patrick was owner/president/manager/coach. He ran the whole team.

‡ Played Rover, a position between both Defences and behind the Centre

=== Stanley Cup engraving ===
The Senators had the words "Ottawa/NHA Champions/1914–15" engraved on the base of the trophy's original bowl even though they did not win the Cup Final. This was similar to the practice prior to the NHA-PCHA agreement when the trophy was officially passed on to the winner of the league championship of the previous Cup champion's league. The previous Cup winner was the 1913–14 NHA champion Toronto Blueshirts.

After the finals, "Vancouver B.C./1914–15/Defeated Ottawa/3 Straight Games" was added to the Cup. Eight players' names and the manager's name were also engraved inside the bowl along the fluted sides.

Two players were left off the Stanley Cup, even though there was room. Kenny Mallen played 14 of 16 regular season games, and two of three games in the finals. Mallen's name was left off by mistake. Jean Matz was left off, because he only played one game.

== See also ==
- List of pre-NHL seasons
- 1914–15 NHA season
- 1914 in sports
- 1915 in sports
