= Spokane Arena (original) =

Former sporting venue in the United States

Coordinates: 47.67031°N 117.44069°W

- Elm Street Barn
- Interactive map of Spokane Arena
- Location: Spokane, Washington
- Operator: Spokane Arena Company
- Capacity: 2,300-4,000
- Surface: mechanically frozen ice

Construction
- Opened: November 1, 1916

Tenants
- Spokane Canaries 1916–17; Gonzaga Bulldogs men's ice hockey 1936–40; Spokane Bombers 1937–41

The Spokane Arena was a 4,000-seat multi-purpose arena in Spokane, Washington, United States. It was home to the Spokane Canaries Pacific Coast Hockey Association franchise from 1916 to 1917. It was built in 1916. The venue was an open air arena that is said to be among the first to utilize artificial ice and had a capacity variously reported to be 2,300-4,000. The arena was located at the corner of North Elm Street and West Maxwell Drive across the street from Cannon Park in Spokane's West Central neighborhood and The Spokesman-Review roughly estimated the arenas' record attendance figure at about 1,500 for the second home game of the Spokane Canaries.
