= Spokane Canaries =

- City: Spokane, Washington
- League: PCHA
- Operated: 1916–1917
- Home arena: Elm Street Barn
- Colors: Yellow and Purple

Franchise history
- 1911–1913: Victoria Senators
- 1913–1916: Victoria Aristocrats
- 1916–1917: Spokane Canaries
- 1917–1918: dormant
- 1918–1922: Victoria Aristocrats
- 1922–1926: Victoria Cougars

Championships
- Stanley Cups: 0
- Playoff championships: 0

The Spokane Canaries (officially Spokane Hockey Club) were a professional ice hockey team in Spokane, Washington. They played in the Pacific Coast Hockey Association for only one season in 1916–17. In the fall of 1916, the Canadian government expropriated the Patrick Arena in Victoria, British Columbia for war-time training purposes, making the arena unavailable for ice hockey use. It was decided to move the club based there, the Victoria Aristocrats, to Spokane, Washington. The team operated without an official nickname but were dubbed the "Canaries" by a local boy after seeing their yellow and purple uniforms. The team was a flop at the gate drawing poor crowds. As a result of this, on February 15, 1917, it was announced that most of the team's home games would subsequently be moved to the Seattle Ice Arena (home of the Seattle Metropolitans). As well what was to be their final home game against the Vancouver Millionaires would be cancelled. The team would fold at season's end. Two years later the club was reactivated in Victoria to become the Victoria Aristocrats again.

The Canaries, coached by player and team captain Lester Patrick, finished 4th and last in the league with 8 wins and 15 losses for 16 points in 23 games. Right winger Albert Kerr led the team offensively with 20 goals and 31 points. Their home games were played at the Elm Street Barn which was an outdoor arena until the late 1930s when a roof was added.

== Roster and statistics ==
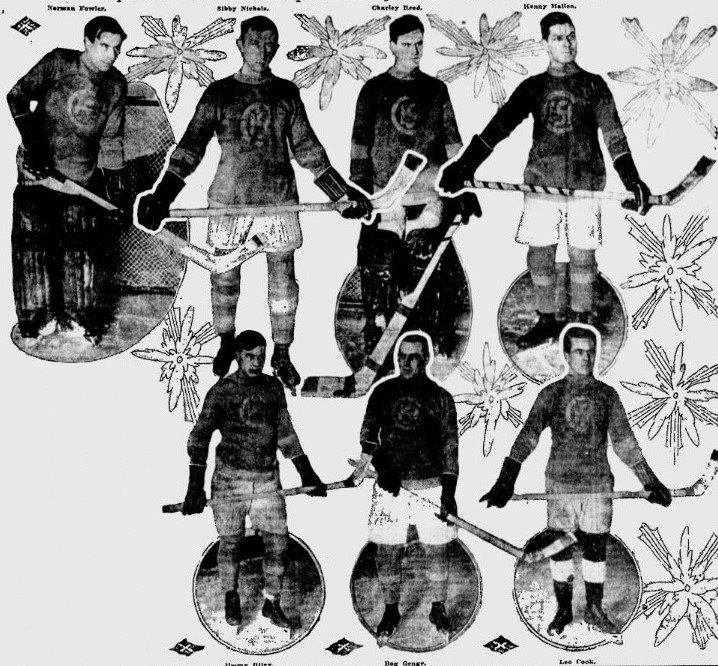
1916–17 Spokane Canaries

=== Skaters ===
GP = Games Played, G = Goals, A = Assists, Pts = Points, PIM = Penalties in minutes

	GP	G	A	Pts	PIM
Albert Kerr, RW	22	20	11	31	38
Lloyd Cook, D	22	13	9	22	32
Ran McDonald, LW	22	13	9	22	26
Sibby Nichols, LW	22	10	11	21	68
Lester Patrick, D	22	10	11	21	15
Ken Mallen, C	21	10	3	13	22
Leo Cook, F	20	9	2	11	18
Bob Genge, C	19	4	3	7	48

=== Goaltender ===
GP = Games Played, W = Wins, L = Losses, T = Ties, MIN = Minutes played, SO = Shutouts, GA = Goals against, GAA = Goals against average

	GP	W	L	T	MIN	SO	GA	GAA
Norman "Hec" Fowler	23	8	15	0	1383	0	143	6.20

== Season-by-season record ==
Note: GP = Games played, W = Wins, L = Losses, T = Ties, GF = Goals for, GA = Goals against

PCHA season	GP	W	L	T	GF	GA	Finish	Playoffs
1916–17	23	8	15	0	89	143	Last in PCHA	Out of playoffs
