= 1919 PCHA season =

Can-Am pro ice hockey league season

- League: Pacific Coast Hockey Association
- Sport: Ice hockey
- Duration: January 1–March 10, 1919
- Teams: 3

Regular season
- League leader: Vancouver Millionaires
- Top scorer: Cyclone Taylor (Vancouver)

Playoffs
- Champions: Seattle Metropolitans
- Runners-up: Vancouver Millionaires

PCHA seasons
- ← 1917–18 1919–20 →

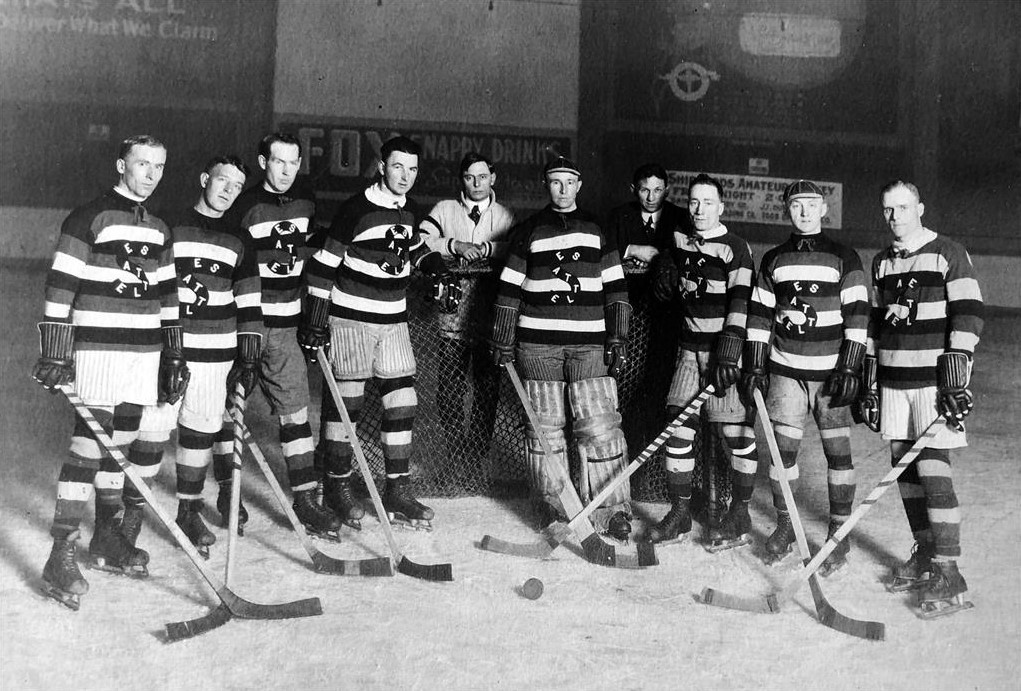
1919 Seattle Metropolitans

The 1919 PCHA season was the eighth season of the professional men's ice hockey Pacific Coast Hockey Association league. Season play ran from January 1 to March 10. The season was increased to 20 games per team.

The Vancouver Millionaires club were the regular season PCHA champions, but lost the playoff to Seattle Metropolitans. The Mets then played in the 1919 Stanley Cup Final against the National Hockey League champion Montreal Canadiens. Due to the ongoing Spanish flu pandemic, the series was not completed; a number of players had to be hospitalized, including Canadiens defenceman Joe Hall, who died four days after the cancellation.

== League business ==
The Portland Rosebuds were suspended for the season. With World War I having ended in November 1918, the Canadian military returned Victoria's Patrick Arena to its normal use before the January 1919 start of the season; having gone dormant for the 1917–18 season, the Victoria Aristocrats were re-activated and took over the contracts of the Rosebud players.

== Teams ==
1919 Pacific Coast Hockey Association
Team	City	Arena	Capacity
Seattle Metropolitans	Seattle, Washington	Seattle Ice Arena	4,000
Vancouver Millionaires	Vancouver, British Columbia	Denman Arena	10,500
Victoria Aristocrats	Victoria, British Columbia	Patrick Arena	4,000

=== Map of teams ===
PCHA Teams

== Regular season ==
Hap Holmes returned to the PCHA to Seattle from Toronto. Vancouver got Art Duncan back from World War I, and picked up Fred Harris from Portland. Seattle's Cully Wilson was suspended from the league for breaking Mickey MacKay's jaw in a fight, using his stick to cross-check MacKay in the face. While Cyclone Taylor won the goal-scoring title with 23 goals, the second-place Bernie Morris scored five goals against Victoria on February 14. Third-place Smokey Harris scored five goals against Victoria on March 10.

=== Final standings ===
Note: W = Wins, L = Losses, T = Ties, GF= Goals For, GA = Goals against
Teams that qualified for the playoffs are highlighted in bold

Pacific Coast Hockey Association	GP	W	L	T	GF	GA
**Vancouver Millionaires**	20	12	8	0	72	55
**Seattle Metropolitans**	20	11	9	0	66	46
Victoria Aristocrats	20	7	13	0	44	81

== Playoffs ==
In a reversal of the previous year's playoffs, the second-place Metropolitans defeated the first-place Vancouver Millionaires. Vancouver was missing Mickey MacKay due to injury and coaxed Si Griffis out of retirement for the last two games of the season and the playoffs.

Frank Foyston was the star of the first game, scoring three goals for Seattle. The 6–1 win was enough to hold the series, as they dropped the return game in Vancouver, where Harris scored two in a losing cause.

Seattle Metropolitans vs. Vancouver Millionaires

Date	Away	Score	Home	Score	Notes
March 12	Vancouver Millionaires	1	**Seattle Metropolitans**	**6**	
March 14	Seattle Metropolitans	1	**Vancouver Millionaires**	**4**	

Seattle wins two-game total-goals series 7 to 5

=== Stanley Cup Final ===
The Mets then played against the NHL champions Montreal Canadiens. Due to the outbreak of flu at the time, players from both teams were hospitalized, and the series was not completed.

Montreal Canadiens vs. Seattle Metropolitans

Date	Away	Score	Home	Score	Notes
March 19	Montreal Canadiens	0	**Seattle Metropolitans**	7	
March 22	Seattle Metropolitans	2	**Montreal Canadiens**	4	
March 24	Montreal Canadiens	2	**Seattle Metropolitans**	7	
March 26	Seattle Metropolitans	0	Montreal Canadiens	0	OT 20'00"
March 30	**Montreal Canadiens**	4	Seattle Metropolitans	3	OT 15'57'

Series ended 2–2–1 and no winner awarded – playoffs were curtailed due to the influenza epidemic

All games were actually played in Seattle, but Seattle is listed as the home team for games played under PCHA rules, and Montreal is the "home" team for games played under NHL rules.

== Schedule and results ==
Month	Day	Visitor	Score	Home	Score
Jan	1	Vancouver	1	Seattle	4
Jan	3	Seattle	7	Victoria	1
Jan	6	Victoria	1	Vancouver	6
Jan	8	Victoria	1	Seattle	0
Jan	10	Vancouver	4	Victoria	1
Jan	13	Seattle	3	Vancouver	2 (OT 2')
Jan	15	Vancouver	1	Seattle	3
Jan	17	Seattle	1	Victoria	3
Jan	20	Victoria	1	Vancouver	4
Jan	22	Victoria	1	Seattle	0
Jan	24	Vancouver	2	Victoria	3
Jan	27	Seattle	5	Vancouver	3
Jan	29	Vancouver	3	Seattle	2
Jan	31	Seattle	1	Victoria	2
Feb	3	Seattle	2	Vancouver	5
Feb	5	Victoria	1	Seattle	9
Feb	7	Vancouver	1	Victoria	0
Feb	10	Victoria	2	Vancouver	1 (OT 3'55")
Feb	12	Vancouver	3	Seattle	2 (OT 23')
Feb	14	Seattle	8	Victoria	2
Feb	17	Seattle	1	Vancouver	6
Feb	19	Victoria	1	Seattle	4
Feb	21	Vancouver	2	Victoria	3 (OT 37'20")
Feb	24	Victoria	3	Vancouver	6
Feb	26	Vancouver	3	Seattle	1
Feb	28	Seattle	5	Victoria	4
Mar	3	Seattle	5	Vancouver	2
Mar	5	Victoria	1	Seattle	3
Mar	7	Vancouver	6	Victoria	5 (OT 11'4")
Mar	10	Victoria	8	Vancouver	11

Source: Coleman

== Player statistics ==
=== Scoring leaders ===
Player	Team	GP	G	A	Pts	PIM
Cyclone Taylor	Vancouver Millionaires	20	23	13	36	12
Bernie Morris	Seattle Metropolitans	20	22	7	29	15
Smokey Harris	Vancouver Millionaires	20	19	6	25	19
Frank Foyston	Seattle Metropolitans	18	15	4	19	0
Mickey MacKay	Vancouver Millionaires	17	9	9	18	9
Barney Stanley	Vancouver Millionaires	20	10	6	16	19
Eddie Oatman	Victoria Aristocrats	18	11	5	16	13
Cully Wilson	Seattle Metropolitans	18	11	5	16	37
Jack Walker	Seattle Metropolitans	20	9	6	15	9
Lloyd Cook	Vancouver Millionaires	20	8	6	14	22

=== Goalkeepers ===
Name	Club	GP	GA	SO	Avg.
Hap Holmes	Seattle	20	46		2.3
Hugh Lehman	Vancouver	20	55	1	2.6
Tommy Murray	Victoria	20	81	2	4.1

Source: Coleman

== See also ==
- 1918–19 NHL season
