= 1916–17 PCHA season =

Can-Am pro ice hockey league season

1916–17 PCHA Season
- League: Pacific Coast Hockey Association
- Sport: Ice hockey
- Duration: December 1, 1916–March 2, 1917
- Number of teams: 4

Results
- Champion: Seattle Metropolitans
- Top scorer: Bernie Morris (Seattle)

PCHA seasons
- ← 1915–16 1917–18 →

The 1916–17 PCHA season was the sixth season of the professional men's ice hockey Pacific Coast Hockey Association league. Season play ran from December 1, 1916, until March 2, 1917. The season was expanded to 24 games per team, except that the final game was cancelled. The Seattle Metropolitans club would be PCHA champions. After the season the club would play the Stanley Cup finals series against the Montreal Canadiens, NHA champions. Seattle would win the best-of-five series 3–1 to win the Cup.

== League business ==
In the fall of 1916, the Canadian government expropriated Victoria's Patrick Arena for war-time training purposes, making the arena unavailable for ice hockey use. It was decided to move the Victoria Aristocrats to Spokane, Washington. This left Vancouver as the only Canadian team. The experiment in Spokane was not a success due to poor attendance. On February 15, 1917, the Spokane Arena announced that the remaining home games would be played in the other team's arenas. The final regular season game between Vancouver and Spokane was subsequently canceled.

== Teams ==
1916–17 Pacific Coast Hockey Association
Team	City	Arena	Capacity
Portland Rosebuds	Portland, Oregon	Portland Ice Arena	2,000
Seattle Metropolitans	Seattle, Washington	Seattle Ice Arena	4,000
Spokane Canaries	Spokane, Washington	Spokane Arena	4,000
Vancouver Millionaires	Vancouver, British Columbia	Denman Arena	10,500

=== Map of teams ===
PCHA Teams

== Regular season ==
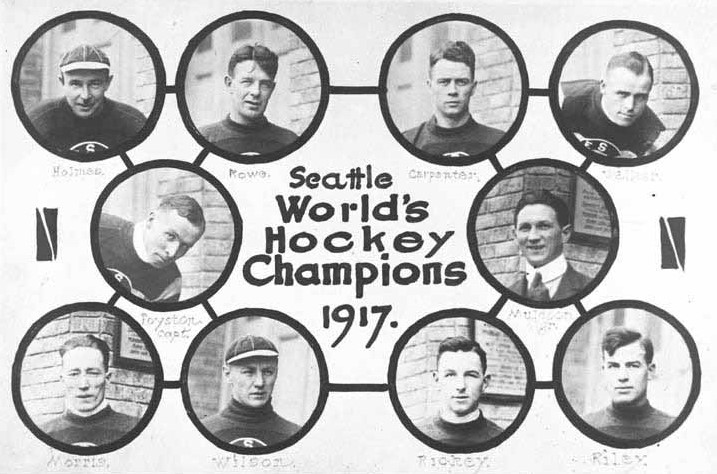
Seattle Metropolitans in 1916–17.

=== Final standings ===
Note: W = Wins, L = Losses, T = Ties, GF= Goals For, GA = Goals against

Pacific Coast Hockey Association	GP	W	L	T	GF	GA
Seattle Metropolitans	24	16	8	0	125	80
Vancouver Millionaires	23	14	9	0	131	124
Portland Rosebuds	24	9	15	0	114	112
Spokane Canaries	23	8	15	0	89	143

== Schedule and results ==
Month	Day	Visitor	Score	Home	Score
Dec.	1	Spokane	5	Portland	4
Dec.	2	Seattle	2	Vancouver	6
Dec.	5	Portland	3	Seattle	4 (OT 11'00")
Dec.	5	Vancouver	4	Spokane	6
Dec.	8	Seattle	2	Portland	5
Dec.	9	Spokane	6	Vancouver	9
Dec.	12	Portland	5	Spokane	7
Dec.	12	Vancouver	7	Seattle	6 (OT 13'40")
Dec.	15	Vancouver	3	Portland	5
Dec.	15	Spokane	0	Seattle	4
Dec.	19	Seattle	3	Spokane	1
Dec.	23	Portland	5	Vancouver	7
Dec.	26	Vancouver	2	Seattle	7
Dec.	26	Portland	2	Spokane	6
Dec.	29	Spokane	5	Portland	10
Dec.	30	Seattle	7	Vancouver	4
Jan.	2	Portland	7	Seattle	4
Jan.	5	Vancouver	3	Portland	5
Jan.	5	Seattle	1	Spokane	5
Jan.	9	Spokane	1	Seattle	3
Jan.	9	Portland	4	Vancouver	5
Jan.	12	Vancouver	3	Seattle	12
Jan.	12	Portland	3	Spokane	5
Jan.	16	Seattle	6	Portland	2
Jan.	19	Portland	3	Seattle	8
Jan.	20	Spokane	3	Vancouver	6
Jan.	23	Vancouver	8	Spokane	5
Jan.	26	Spokane	5	Portland	4
Jan.	27	Seattle	2	Vancouver	3
Jan.	30	Spokane	2	Seattle	4
Jan.	30	Vancouver	7	Portland	11
Feb.	2	Seattle	16	Spokane	1
Feb.	3	Portland	1	Vancouver	6
Feb.	6	Portland	3	Spokane	4 (OT 3'00")
Feb.	6	Vancouver	4	Seattle	8
Feb.	9	Seattle	1	Portland	5
Feb.	10	Spokane	1	Vancouver	8
Feb.	13	Spokane	8	Vancouver	12
Feb.	13	Portland	2	Seattle	5
Feb.	16	Spokane	1	Portland	9
Feb.	17	Seattle	2	Vancouver	4
Feb.	20	Vancouver	4	Portland	6
Feb.	23	Spokane	7	Seattle	9
Feb.	24	Portland	4	Vancouver	5
Feb.	27	Spokane	0	Seattle	7
March	2	Spokane	5	Vancouver	11
March	2	Seattle	4	Portland	3
March		Vancouver		Spokane	cancelled

Source: Coleman 1966.

== Player statistics ==
=== Scoring leaders ===
Player	Team	GP	G	A	Pts	PIM
Bernie Morris	Seattle Metropolitans	24	37	17	54	17
Gordon Roberts	Vancouver Millionaires	23	43	10	53	42
Frank Foyston	Seattle Metropolitans	24	36	12	48	51
Barney Stanley	Victoria Aristocrats	23	28	18	46	9
Dick Irvin	Portland Rosebuds	23	35	10	45	24
Mickey MacKay	Vancouver Millionaires	23	22	11	33	37
Dubbie Kerr	Spokane Canaries	23	20	11	31	58
Smokey Harris	Portland Rosebuds	23	18	13	31	39
Cyclone Taylor	Vancouver Millionaires	12	14	15	29	12
Tommy Dunderdale	Portland Rosebuds	24	22	4	26	141

=== Goaltending averages ===
Name	Club	GP	GA	SO	Avg.
Hap Holmes	Seattle	24	80	2	3.3
Tom Murray	Portland	24	112		4.7
Hugh Lehman	Vancouver	23	124		5.4
Norman Fowler	Spokane	23	143		6.2

== See also ==
- 1916–17 NHA season
- 1916 in sports
- 1917 in sports
- Pacific Coast Hockey Association
- List of pre-NHL seasons
