= Patrick Arena =

Victoria, Canada ice hockey arena (1911–1929)

Coordinates: 48°25′57.83″N 123°19′09.48″W

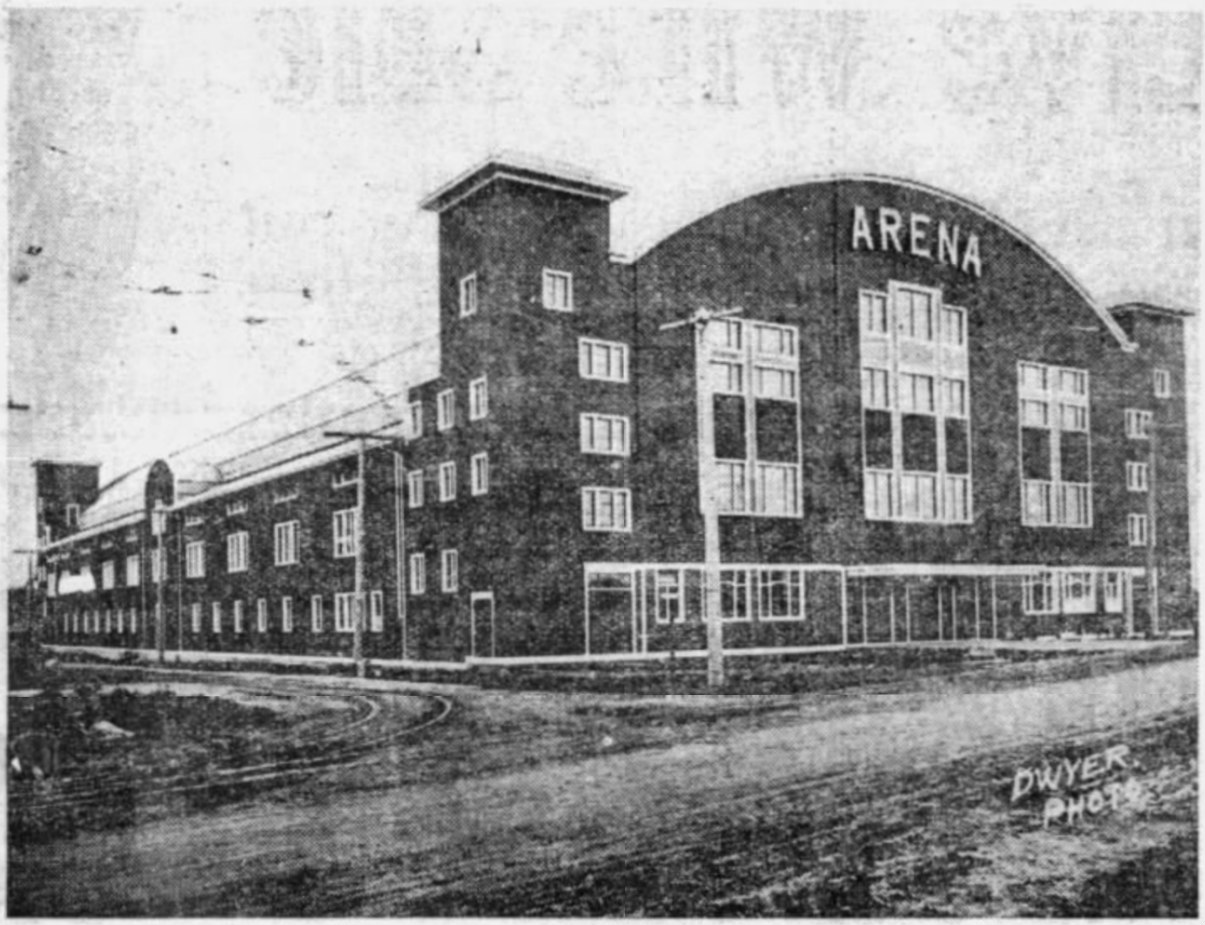
Patrick Arena in 1912 with an adjacent streetcar track.

Patrick Arena (1911–1929) was the main sports arena located in the Greater Victoria, British Columbia area. The wood construction, brick-faced arena was located in the suburb municipality of Oak Bay, on the northeast corner of Cadboro Bay Road and Epworth Street (then called Empress Street). Built in 1911 at a cost of $110,000 with a capacity for 4,000 spectators, it officially opened with public skating on December 25, 1911. More than 600 skaters enjoyed the thrill of opening day. The owners, Frank and Lester Patrick, built the arena primarily to accommodate their hockey team in the newly formed Pacific Coast Hockey Association (PCHA). The Patrick Arena was destroyed by fire in 1929.

== Professional hockey ==
The first professional hockey game played at the Patrick Arena was between the New Westminster Royals and the hometown Victoria Senators on January 2, 1912. This was likely the first professional game on artificial ice in Canada. In 1913 the Victoria Senators were renamed the Victoria Aristocrats. In 1916, during World War I, Patrick Arena was commandeered by the Canadian military and the hockey team was forced to move to Spokane, Washington to play as the Spokane Canaries. When the military left, a new team was formed in 1918 and again was dubbed the Aristocrats. In 1923 they changed their name to the Victoria Cougars and when the PCHA disbanded in 1924 they moved to the Western Canada Hockey League (WCHL).

The 1925 Stanley Cup Finals saw the Western Canada Hockey League champion Victoria Cougars defeat the National Hockey League (NHL) champion Montreal Canadiens 3 games to 1 in the best-of-five game series. Games one, three and four were played at Patrick Arena, with game two at Denman Arena in downtown Vancouver. The next year the Western Canada Hockey League was renamed the Western Hockey League (WHL) with the Victoria Cougars winning the league championship again. In Victoria's second Stanley Cup Finals the Montreal Maroons were too strong, outscoring Victoria 10 to 3 and handily beating them three games to one at the newly built Montreal Forum. The Western Hockey League folded following the 1925–26 season and the new Detroit NHL franchise purchased the Victoria Cougars players and played as the Detroit Cougars until 1930 and as the Detroit Falcons 1930–1932 before finally becoming the Detroit Red Wings in October 1932.

The next professional hockey team in Victoria was the Pacific Coast Hockey League's (PCHL) Victoria Cubs who began play in 1928. They were also scheduled to play in the 1929–1930 season but a fire destroyed the Patrick Arena on November 11, 1929, and the team played that season as a "road team." Their 18 scheduled home games were played on the road, divided between Vancouver (BC) and Seattle. After the team moved to Tacoma, Washington and became the Tacoma Tigers in 1930, Greater Victoria was without pro hockey until 1949, when a new version of the Victoria Cougars joined a new version of the PCHL in the new Victoria Memorial Arena.

== Fire ==
The arena was destroyed by a fire in the pre-dawn hours of November 11, 1929.

== Now ==
In 2001 a cairn commemorating the 1925 Stanley Cup victory by the Victoria Cougars was erected on Cadboro Bay Road in front of Oak Bay High School, right across the street from the old site of the Patrick Arena. The site of the arena is now a residential area.
