= 1916–17 Seattle Metropolitans season =

1916–17 Seattle Metropolitans
- PCHA league champions
- Stanley Cup champions
- 1916–17 record: 16–8–0
- Home record: 11–2–0
- Road record: 5–6–0
- Goals for: 125
- Goals against: 80

Team information
- General manager: Pete Muldoon
- Coach: Pete Muldoon
- Arena: Seattle Ice Arena

Team leaders
- Goals: Bernie Morris (37)
- Assists: Bernie Morris (17)
- Points: Bernie Morris (54)
- Penalty minutes: Frank Foyston (51)

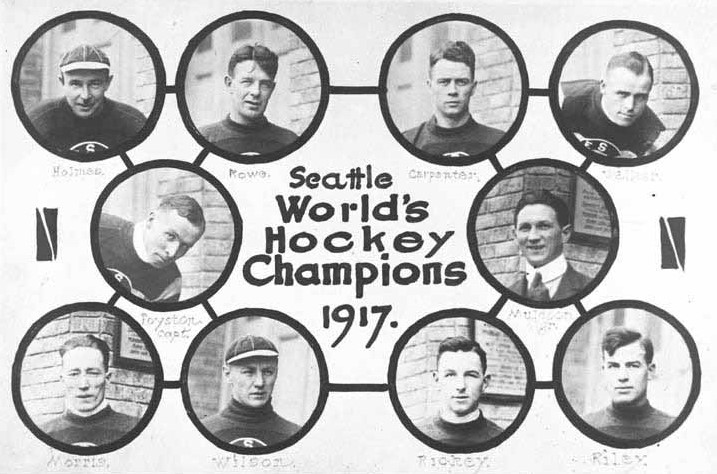
Seattle Metropolitans team in 1917.

The 1916–17 Seattle Metropolitans season was the Seattle Metropolitans's second season playing in the Pacific Coast Hockey Association. They were league champions of the 1916–17 PCHA season, and went on to become the first American ice hockey team to win the Stanley Cup, after defeating the Montreal Canadiens in the 1917 Stanley Cup Final.

== Final standings ==
Note: W = Wins, L = Losses, T = Ties, GF= Goals For, GA = Goals against

Pacific Coast Hockey Association	GP	W	L	T	GF	GA
Seattle Metropolitans	24	16	8	0	125	80
Vancouver Millionaires	23	14	9	0	131	124
Portland Rosebuds	24	9	15	0	114	112
Spokane Canaries	23	8	15	0	89	143

== Schedule and results ==
=== Regular season ===
1916–17 results: 16–8 (Home: 11–2; Road: 5–6)

December: 5–3 (Home: 3–1; Road: 2–2)
#	Date	Visitor	Score	Home	OT	Record
1	December 2	Seattle	2–5	Vancouver		0–1
2	December 5	Portland	3–4	Seattle	OT	1–1
3	December 8	Seattle	2–5	Portland		1–2
4	December 12	Vancouver	7–6	Seattle	OT	1–3
5	December 15	Spokane	0–4	Seattle		2–3
6	December 19	Seattle	3–1	Spokane		3–3
7	December 26	Vancouver	2–7	Seattle		4–3
8	December 30	Seattle	7–4	Vancouver		5–3

January: 5–3 (Home: 4–1; Road: 1–2)
#	Date	Visitor	Score	Home	OT	Record
9	January 2	Portland	7–4	Seattle		5–4
10	January 5	Seattle	1–5	Spokane		5–5
11	January 9	Spokane	1–3	Seattle		6–5
12	January 12	Vancouver	3–12	Seattle		7–5
13	January 16	Seattle	6–2	Portland		8–5
14	January 19	Portland	3–8	Seattle		9–5
15	January 27	Seattle	2–3	Vancouver		9–6
16	January 30	Spokane	2–4	Seattle		10–6

February: 5–2 (Home: 4–0; Road: 1–2)
#	Date	Visitor	Score	Home	OT	Record
17	February 2	Seattle	16–1	Spokane		11–6
18	February 6	Vancouver	4–8	Seattle		12–6
19	February 9	Seattle	1–5	Portland		12–7
20	February 13	Portland	2–5	Seattle		13–7
21	February 17	Seattle	2–4	Vancouver		13–8
22	February 23	Spokane	7–9	Seattle		14–8
23	February 27	Spokane	0–7	Seattle		15–8

March: 1–0 (Home: 0–0; Road: 1–0)
#	Date	Visitor	Score	Home	OT	Record
24	March 2	Seattle	4–3	Portland		16–8

=== Playoffs ===
1917 Stanley Cup

Stanley Cup Final vs. (NHA) Montreal Canadiens: Seattle won 3–1
#	Date	Visitor	Score	Home	OT	Rules	Record
1	March 17	Montreal	8–4	Seattle		PCHA	0–1
2	March 20	Montreal	1–6	Seattle		NHA	1–1
3	March 23	Montreal	1–4	Seattle		PCHA	2–1
4	March 26	Montreal	1–9	Seattle		NHA	3–1

== Seattle Metropolitans 1917 Stanley Cup champions ==
=== Players ===
Centres

- Bernie Morris
- 7 Jack Walker‡

Wingers

- 4 Frank Foyston
- Jim Riley
- Carol Cully Wilson

Defencemen

- Bobby Rowe (Captain)
- Roy Rickey
- Everard Eddie Carpenter

Goaltenders

- 1 Harry Hap Holmes

=== Coaching and administrative staff ===
- Pete Muldoon (President-Owner/Manager-Coach)

‡ Played rover, a position between both defences and behind the centre.

=== Engraving ===
The 1917 Stanley Cup was presented by the trophy's trustee William Foran. The Metropolitans never did engrave their name on the Cup for their championship season.

It was not until the trophy was redesigned in 1948 that the words "1917 Seattle Metropolitans" was put onto its then-new collar.

== See also ==
- 1916–17 PCHA season
