= 1919 Stanley Cup Final =

1919 ice hockey championship series

	1	2	3	4	5	Total
Montreal Canadiens (NHL)	0	4	2	0**	4*	2
Seattle Metropolitans (PCHA)	7	2	7	0**	3*	2
- * – Denotes overtime period(s)
- Location(s): Seattle Ice Arena
- Format: Best-of-five
- Coaches: Montreal: Newsy Lalonde; Seattle: Pete Muldoon
- Dates: March 19–29, 1919
- Hall of Famers: Canadiens: Joe Hall (1961); Newsy Lalonde (1950); Joe Malone (1950); Didier Pitre (1963); Georges Vezina (1945); Metropolitans: Frank Foyston (1958); Hap Holmes (1972); Jack Walker (1960); Coaches: Newsy Lalonde (1950, player)

The 1919 Stanley Cup Final was the ice hockey playoff series to determine the 1919 Stanley Cup champions. The series was cancelled due to an outbreak of Spanish flu after five games had been played, and no champion was declared. It was the only time in the history of the Stanley Cup that it was not awarded due to a no-decision after playoffs were held.

The series was a rematch of the 1917 Stanley Cup Final and the first since the armistice to end World War I. Hosting the series in Seattle was the Pacific Coast Hockey Association (PCHA) champion Seattle Metropolitans, playing against the National Hockey League (NHL) champion Montreal Canadiens. Both teams had won two games, lost two, and tied one before health officials were forced to cancel the deciding game of the series; after the Game 4 tie, the teams had agreed to play sudden death overtime if required. Most of the Canadiens players and their manager George Kennedy fell ill with the flu and were hospitalized, leaving only three healthy players. The flu claimed the life of Canadiens defenceman Joe Hall four days later. Kennedy was terminally weakened by his illness, and it led to his death in 1921.

== Paths to the Finals ==
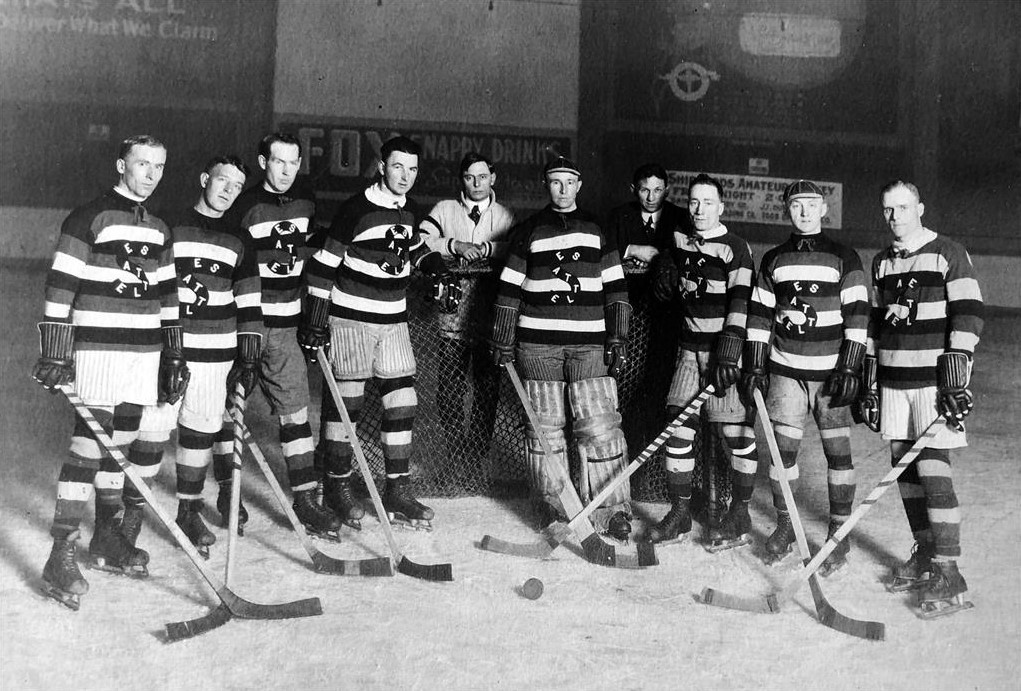
1919 Seattle Metropolitans

The Canadiens won the first half of the 1918–19 NHL regular season while the Ottawa Senators won the second half, setting up a best-of-seven series between the two clubs to determine the NHL title. Montreal ended up winning the series, four games to one.

Meanwhile, the Metropolitans finished the 1919 PCHA regular season in second place with an 11–9 record, behind the 12–8 Vancouver Millionaires. The two teams then faced off in a two-game total-goals championship series. Hours before the puck dropped for Game One, Metropolitans leading scorer Bernie Morris was arrested by United States authorities for alleged draft dodging. Without Morris, Seattle won game one 6–1 after Frank Foyston notched a hat trick, essentially ending the aggregate goals series. Vancouver recorded a 4–1 victory in game two, but lost the series to the Metropolitans by a combined score of 7–5. Morris was ultimately sentenced to two years hard labor at the U.S. Military Prison - Alcatraz, though his conviction was overturned after one year when he was granted an honorable discharge from the U.S. Army and sent straight to Ottawa for the 1920 Stanley Cup Final.

== Game summaries ==
All of the games were held at the Seattle Ice Arena. As with previous Stanley Cup series, the differing rules for the leagues alternated each game. PCHA rules were to be used in games one, three, and five; and NHL rules were to be used in games two and four. The actual game five used NHL rules, as it was considered a replay of game four. Seattle dominated Montreal under PCHA rules, scoring two in the first, three in the second, and a further two in the third. Corbeau of Montreal was injured but finished the game and continued to play in the series as a substitute.

The Canadiens evened the series in game two with Newsy Lalonde scoring all of Montreal's goals. Montreal took the lead and never relinquished it, although Seattle scored two in 32 seconds in the third to make it close. Joe Hall took a puck to the nose on a deliberate play by Cully Wilson, but the rough tactics did not continue as Seattle tried to catch up.

Back under PCHA rules, the Metropolitans won game three, 7–2. Seattle scored four goals in the first to take a commanding lead. No goals were scored in the second. In the third, Seattle prevented any comeback, outscoring Montreal 3–2.

Game four has been considered one of the greatest hockey games ever played, ending in a scoreless tie after 20 minutes of overtime, with Seattle's Hap Holmes and Montreal's Georges Vézina blocking every shot. At the end of the first period, the Mets' Cully Wilson scored a goal, but Hall of Fame referee Mickey Ion waved it off, deciding it was scored just after he had blown the period's final whistle. Near the close of the second overtime, Berlinguette of Montreal had a chance to win it but missed by inches. Wilson of Seattle mixed it up with Berlinguette, who had to leave the ice. As players lay collapsed across the ice, the crowd gave both teams an ovation after the game in appreciation of the teams' play.

Between games four and five, discussions were made about which rules to use for game five. As game four had finished in a tie, the Canadiens wanted game five to be a replay of game four, using NHL rules, and Seattle wanted PCHA rules. The game was played under NHL rules, and it was agreed that in the future, teams would play overtime until a winning goal was scored.

Montreal trailed in the game 3–0 after two periods, but Seattle tired, and Montreal scored three to force overtime. Lalonde had the Canadiens' second and third goals. In the extra period, Montreal's substitute Jack McDonald sprinted on the ice and tallied the game-winning goal in dramatic fashion after the Mets were down a player when Frank Foyston was injured, Jack Walker broke a skate, and Cully Wilson collapsed from exhaustion, leading the Canadiens to a 4–3 victory. The Metropolitans had only one substitute player, and the team was exhausted. On the last play, Cully Wilson went to the bench to be replaced by Frank Foyston. Foyston had scored nine of Seattle's 19 goals in the series, but by that point, he was unable to move and replace Wilson, leaving the team shorthanded while McDonald scored. Some players went to the hospital after the game, while others had to be carried home.

March 19	Montreal Canadiens	0–7	Seattle Metropolitans	Seattle Ice Arena	Recap
No scoring		First period	04:52 – Muzz Murray (1); 08:34 – Frank Foyston (1)
No scoring		Second period	05:58 – Muzz Murray (2); 09:55 – Frank Foyston (2); 16:38 – Jack Walker (1)
No scoring		Third period	05:43 – Frank Foyston (3); 14:44 – Ran McDonald (1)
Georges Vezina		Goalie stats	Hap Holmes

March 22	Montreal Canadiens	4–2	Seattle Metropolitans	Seattle Ice Arena	Recap
Newsy Lalonde (1) – 08:44		First period	No scoring
Newsy Lalonde (2) – 08:18; Newsy Lalonde (3) – 16:35		Second period	No scoring
Newsy Lalonde (4) – 09:49		Third period	11:03 – Bobby Rowe (1); 11:11 – Frank Foyston (4)
Georges Vezina		Goalie stats	Hap Holmes

March 24	Montreal Canadiens	2–7	Seattle Metropolitans	Seattle Ice Arena	Recap
No scoring		First period	01:03 – Frank Foyston (5); 07:41 – Frank Foyston (6); 15:54 – Cully Wilson (1); 18:36 – Frank Foyston (7)
No scoring		Second period	No scoring
Odie Cleghorn (1) – 03:21; Louis Berlinguette (1) – 12:34		Third period	12:39 – Frank Foyston (8); 12:51 – Muzz Murray (3); 14:57 – Roy Rickey (1)
Georges Vezina		Goalie stats	Hap Holmes

March 26	Montreal Canadiens	0–0	2OT	Seattle Metropolitans	Seattle Ice Arena	Recap
No scoring		First period		No scoring
No scoring		Second period		No scoring
No scoring		Third period		No scoring
No scoring		Second overtime period		No scoring
Georges Vezina		Goalie stats		Hap Holmes

March 29	Montreal Canadiens	4–3	OT	Seattle Metropolitans	Seattle Ice Arena	Recap
No scoring		First period		05:40 – Frank Foyston (9); 12:52 – Jack Walker (2)
No scoring		Second period		01:18 – Jack Walker (3)
Odie Cleghorn (2) – 04:00; Newsy Lalonde (5) – 05:01; Newsy Lalonde (6) – 17:05		Third period		No scoring
Jack McDonald (1) – 15:51		First overtime period		No scoring
Georges Vezina		Goalie stats		Hap Holmes

Series stopped at 2–2–1

== Cancellation ==
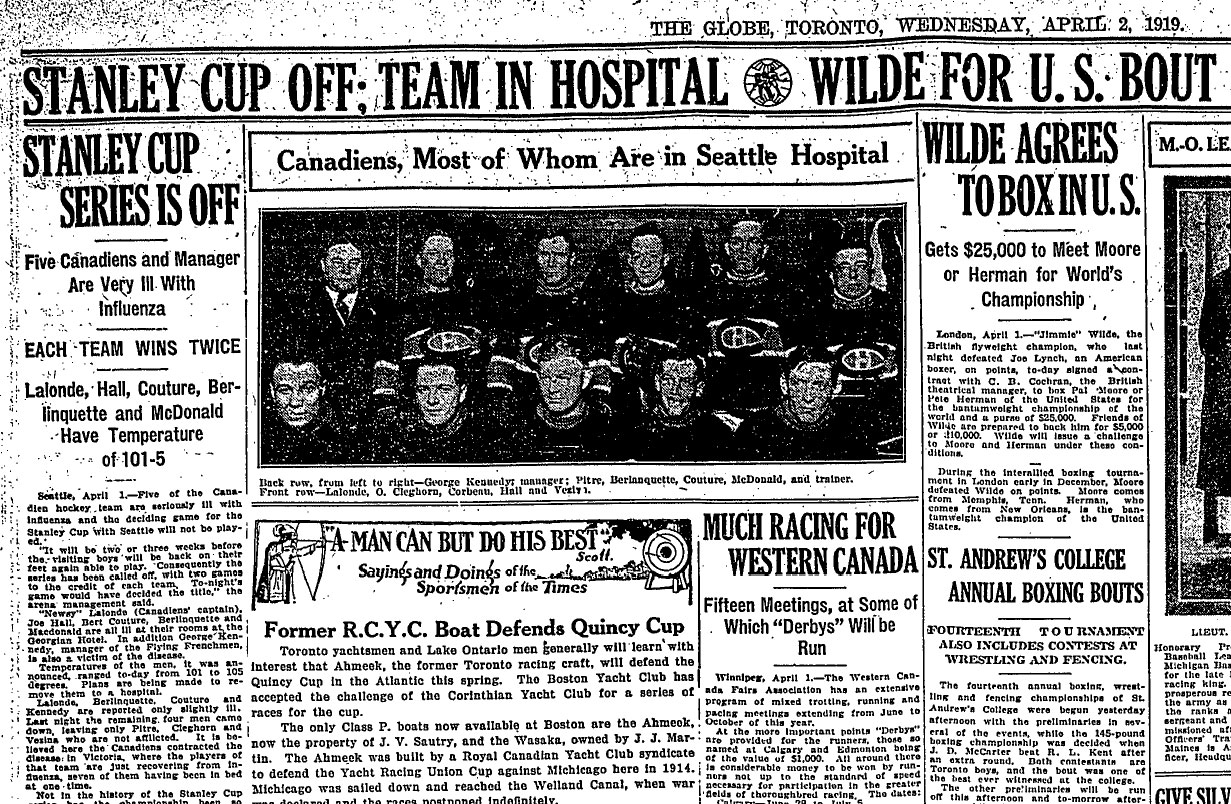
Announcement of cancellation in The Globe

The sixth and deciding game of the series was scheduled for April 1, but an outbreak of influenza caused several players on both teams to become seriously ill. With Lalonde, Hall, Coutu, Berlinguette, and McDonald of Montreal hospitalized or sick in bed, with fevers between 101 and 105 degrees Fahrenheit, game six was cancelled just five and a half hours before it was scheduled to start. Kennedy said he was forfeiting the Cup to Seattle, but Pete Muldoon, manager-coach of the Metropolitans, refused to accept the Cup in a forfeiture, seeing that it was catastrophic illness that had caused the Canadiens lineup to be short of players. Kennedy asked to use players from the Victoria team of the PCHA, but president Frank Patrick refused the request.

Four days later, Joe Hall died of pneumonia brought about by the flu. His funeral was held in Vancouver on April 8, with most team members attending, and he was buried in Brandon, Manitoba. Manager George Kennedy also was stricken. His condition declined, and his wife arrived from Montreal to be with him. He never fully recovered from his symptoms and died 2 years later.

== Stanley Cup engraving ==
No official Stanley Cup winner was declared in 1919, and thus nothing was engraved onto the trophy. However, when the Cup was redesigned in 1948 and a new collar was added to include those teams that did not engrave their names on the trophy themselves, the following was added:

1919
Montreal Canadiens
Seattle Metropolitans
Series Not Completed

== Team rosters ==
=== Montreal Canadiens ===
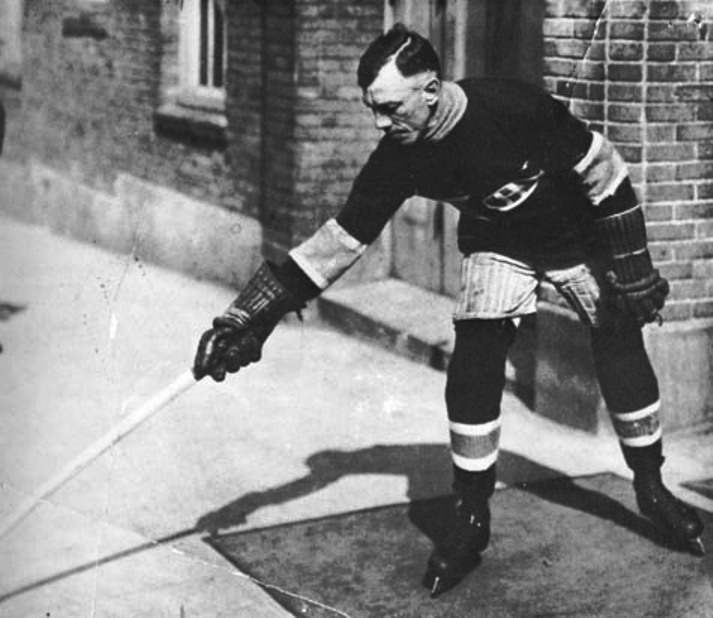
Joe Hall

Goaltenders
#	Player	Catches	Acquired	Place of birth		Finals appearance
1	Georges Vezina	L	1910	(Canada)	Chicoutimi, Quebec	third (1916, 1917)

Defencemen
#	Player	Shoots	Acquired	Place of birth		Finals appearance
2	Bert Corbeau	R	1914	(Canada)	Penetanguishene, Ontario	third (1916, 1917)
9	Billy Coutu	L	1916	(Canada)	North Bay, Ontario	second (1917)
3	Joe Hall	R	1917	(United Kingdom)	Staffordshire, England	fifth (1904, 1907, 1912, 1913)
5	Didier Pitre	R	1914	(Canada)	Valleyfield, Quebec	fourth (1909, 1916, 1917)

Forwards
#	Player	Position	Shoots	Acquired	Place of birth		Finals appearance
7	Amos Arbour	LW	L	1918	(Canada)	Waubaushene, Ontario	second (1916)
9	Billy Bell	C	R	1917	(Canada)	Lachine, Quebec	—
8	Louis Berlinguette	LW	L	1911	(Canada)	Papineau, Quebec	fifth (1911, 1912, 1916, 1917)
6	Odie Cleghorn	RW	R	1918	(Canada)	Montreal, Quebec	first
11	Fred Doherty	RW	L	1918	(Canada)	Norwood, Ontario	second (1912)
4	Newsy Lalonde – C	C‡	R	1912	(Canada)	Cornwall, Ontario	fourth (1908, 1916, 1917)
7	Joe Malone	C	L	1917	(Canada)	Quebec City, Quebec	third (1912, 1913)
10	Jack McDonald	LW	R	1917	(Canada)	Quebec City, Quebec	third (1907, 1912)

Sources:

- Mouton 1987
- NHL.com

=== Seattle Metropolitans ===
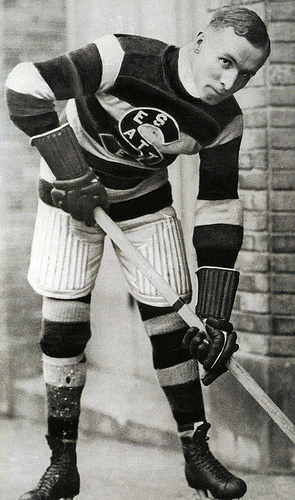
Frank Foyston

Goaltenders
#	Player	Catches	Acquired	Place of birth		Finals appearance
1	Harry Hap Holmes	L	1918	(Canada)	Aurora, Ontario	fourth (1914, 1917, 1918)

Defencemen
#	Player	Shoots	Acquired	Place of birth		Finals appearance
10	Bernie Morris† – C	R	1915	(Canada)	Brandon, Manitoba	—
3	Roy Rickey	L	1915	(Canada)	Ottawa, Ontario
2	Bobby Rowe	L	1915	(Canada)	Heathcote, Ontario	third (1914, 1917)

Forwards
#	Player	Position	Shoots	Acquired	Place of birth		Finals appearance
6	Frank Foyston	LW‡	L	1915	(Canada)	Minesing, Ontario	third (1914, 1917)
	Ran McDonald	RW	R	1915	(Canada)	Cashion's Glen, Ontario	third (1914, 1917)
5	Hugh Muzz Murray	C/LW	L	1918	(United States)	Sault Ste. Marie, Michigan	first
4	Jack Walker	C/R	L	1915	(Canada)	Silver Mountain, Ontario	fourth (1911, 1914, 1917)
7	Carol Cully Wilson	RW	R	1915	(Canada)	Winnipeg, Manitoba	third (1914, 1917)

† Morris did not play in the series due to his arrest for draft evasion. ‡ Played rover position.

Sources:

- Coleman, 1966

== See also ==
- History of the National Hockey League (1917–1942)

Preceded by Toronto; 1918	(no champion); Stanley Cup champions 1919	Succeeded by Ottawa Senators; 1920
