= Jim Riley (ice hockey) =

Canadian baseball and ice hockey player (1895-1969)

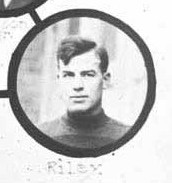
- Born: James Norman Riley; May 25, 1895; Bayfield, New Brunswick, Canada
- Died: May 25, 1969 (aged 74); Seguin, Texas, U.S.
- Baseball career
- Second baseman
- Batted: Left Threw: Right

MLB debut
- July 3, 1921, for the St. Louis Browns

Last MLB appearance
- October 7, 1923, for the Washington Senators

MLB statistics
- Batting average: .000
- At bats: 14
- Runs scored: 1
- Stats at Baseball Reference

Teams
- St. Louis Browns (1921); Washington Senators (1923)
Ice hockey career
- Height: 5 ft 11 in (180 cm)
- Weight: 180 lb (82 kg; 12 st 12 lb)
- Position: Left wing
- Shot: Left
- Played for: Chicago Black Hawks; Detroit Cougars; Seattle Metropolitans; Victoria Aristocrats
- Playing career: 1915–1929

James Norman Riley (May 25, 1895 – May 25, 1969) was a Canadian professional ice hockey and baseball player. The only person to play in both the National Hockey League (NHL) and Major League Baseball (MLB), Riley played nine games in the NHL in 1926–27 and six games in MLB between 1921 and 1923. In hockey he also played eight seasons in the Pacific Coast Hockey Association, a rival major league of the NHL, in a career that lasted from 1915 to 1929. While in the PCHA he mainly played for the Seattle Metropolitans, and won the Stanley Cup in 1917. Riley's baseball career lasted 12 seasons from 1921 to 1932, and was mainly spent in the minor leagues.

== Early life ==
Born in Bayfield, New Brunswick, he moved to west Calgary as a boy. After a season of amateur hockey on the Calgary Victorias he become a professional player after signing with the Victoria Aristocrats in time for the 1915–1916 season.

== Career ==
Riley played 17 games in the National Hockey League and 90 games in the Pacific Coast Hockey Association, as a member of the Chicago Black Hawks, Detroit Cougars, and Seattle Metropolitans. He won the Stanley Cup with Seattle in 1917. In 1922–23, he was named a PCHA First Team All-Star.

In addition, Riley played professional baseball for 12 seasons, from 1921 to 1932, mostly in the minor leagues. After batting .303 and hitting nine home runs in 56 games for the Vancouver Beavers in 1921 he was signed by the St. Louis Browns. He started his career as a second baseman, and played in four games at that position for the 1921 St. Louis Browns of the American League, thus becoming the only athlete in sports history to play both Major League Baseball and in the National Hockey League. After that season, he switched permanently to first base, and returned to the major leagues with the 1923 Washington Senators, playing two games with them, before resuming his career in the minors. In six major league games, he was 0-for-14.

He was inducted into the New Brunswick Sports Hall of Fame in 2000.

== Personal life ==
He served in England for one in the Canadian Army in 1918 and achieved the rank of sergeant. He served as part of an engineering detachment and played 3rd base on one of the military teams. Due to the Spanish Flu Outbreak causing things to slow down he never saw action and was discharged in 1919 where he returned to Seattle and played seven more seasons there. Upon his retirement from professional sports in 1932 he worked for a distillery in Dallas. He and his family moved to Seguin, TX. He enjoyed playing golf and won an amateur golf title in the 1920s in Vancouver and won the U.S. National Senior Golf Tournament in North Carolina in the 1960s. He played well into his 70s. Suffering from lung and stomach cancer, Riley died in Seguin, Texas, the day of his 74th birthday, May 25, 1969. He is buried at Guadalupe Valley Memorial Park in New Braunfels, TX. In 1973 his wife, Martha, died.

== Career ice hockey statistics ==
=== Regular season and playoffs ===
			Regular season					Playoffs
Season	Team	League	GP	G	A	Pts	PIM	GP	G	A	Pts	PIM
1914–15	Calgary Victorias	ASHL	—	—	—	—	—	—	—	—	—	—
1915–16	Victoria Aristocrats	PCHA	12	4	1	5	14	—	—	—	—	—
1916–17	Seattle Metropolitans	PCHA	24	11	5	16	34	—	—	—	—	—
1916–17	Seattle Metropolitans	St-Cup	—	—	—	—	—	4	0	0	0	3
1919–20	Seattle Metropolitans	PCHA	22	11	4	15	49	2	1	2	3	0
1919–20	Seattle Metropolitans	St-Cup	—	—	—	—	—	5	0	1	1	0
1920–21	Seattle Metropolitans	PCHA	24	23	5	28	20	2	0	0	0	0
1921–22	Seattle Metropolitans	PCHA	24	16	2	18	27	2	0	0	0	3
1922–23	Seattle Metropolitans	PCHA	30	23	4	27	70	—	—	—	—	—
1923–24	Seattle Metropolitans	PCHA	13	2	2	4	1	2	0	1	1	2
1926–27	Dallas Ice Kings	Exhib	—	—	—	—	—	—	—	—	—	—
1926–27	Chicago Black Hawks	NHL	3	0	0	0	0	—	—	—	—	—
1926–27	Detroit Cougars	NHL	6	0	2	2	14	—	—	—	—	—
1928–29	Los Angeles Richfields	Cal-Pro	—	2	2	4	—	—	—	—	—	—
PCHA totals			167	94	26	120	240	10	2	3	5	8
NHL totals			9	0	2	2	14	—	—	—	—	—
