= Frank Nighbor =

Canadian ice hockey player (1893–1966)

- Hockey Hall of Fame, 1947
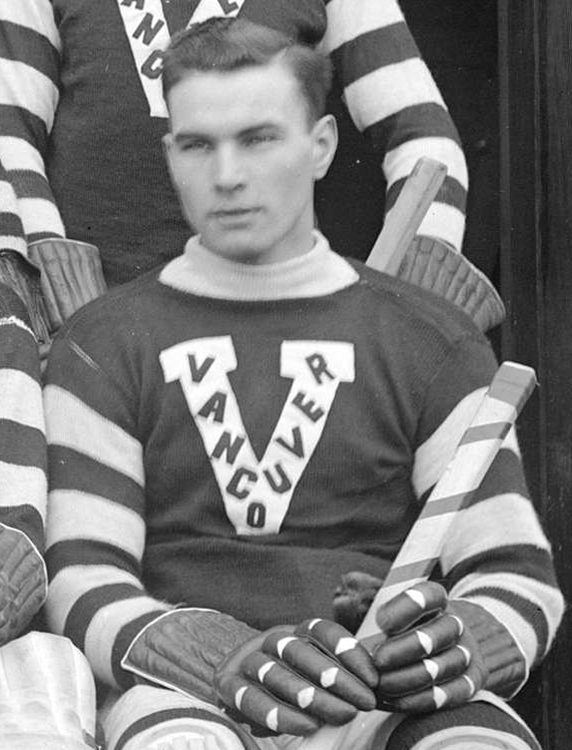
- Nighbor with the Vancouver Millionaires in the 1913–14 season
- Born: January 26, 1893 Pembroke, Ontario, Canada
- Died: April 13, 1966 (aged 73) Pembroke, Ontario, Canada
- Height: 5 ft 9 in (175 cm)
- Weight: 160 lb (73 kg; 11 st 6 lb)
- Position: Centre
- Shot: Left
- Played for: Toronto Blueshirts; Vancouver Millionaires; Ottawa Senators; Toronto Maple Leafs
- Playing career: 1912–1930

Julius Francis Joseph Nighbor (January 26, 1893 – April 13, 1966) was a Canadian professional ice hockey forward who played primarily for the Ottawa Senators of the National Hockey Association (NHA) and National Hockey League (NHL). He also played for the Toronto Blueshirts of the NHA, Vancouver Millionaires of the Pacific Coast Hockey Association (PCHA), and Toronto Maple Leafs of the NHL. Nighbor won the Stanley Cup once with the Millionaires and four times with the Senators. He was also known as the "Pembroke Peach", "The Flying Dutchman" and as "Peerless Frank."

Nighbor was a defensive forward known for his poke checking, back checking, and body checking which limited opposing forwards' scoring attempts. Although he received relatively high penalty totals, he was a clean player and was one of the last 60-minute hockey players. In recognition of his contributions on the ice, Nighbor became the first player to be awarded both the Hart Trophy and the Lady Byng Trophy.

== Playing career ==
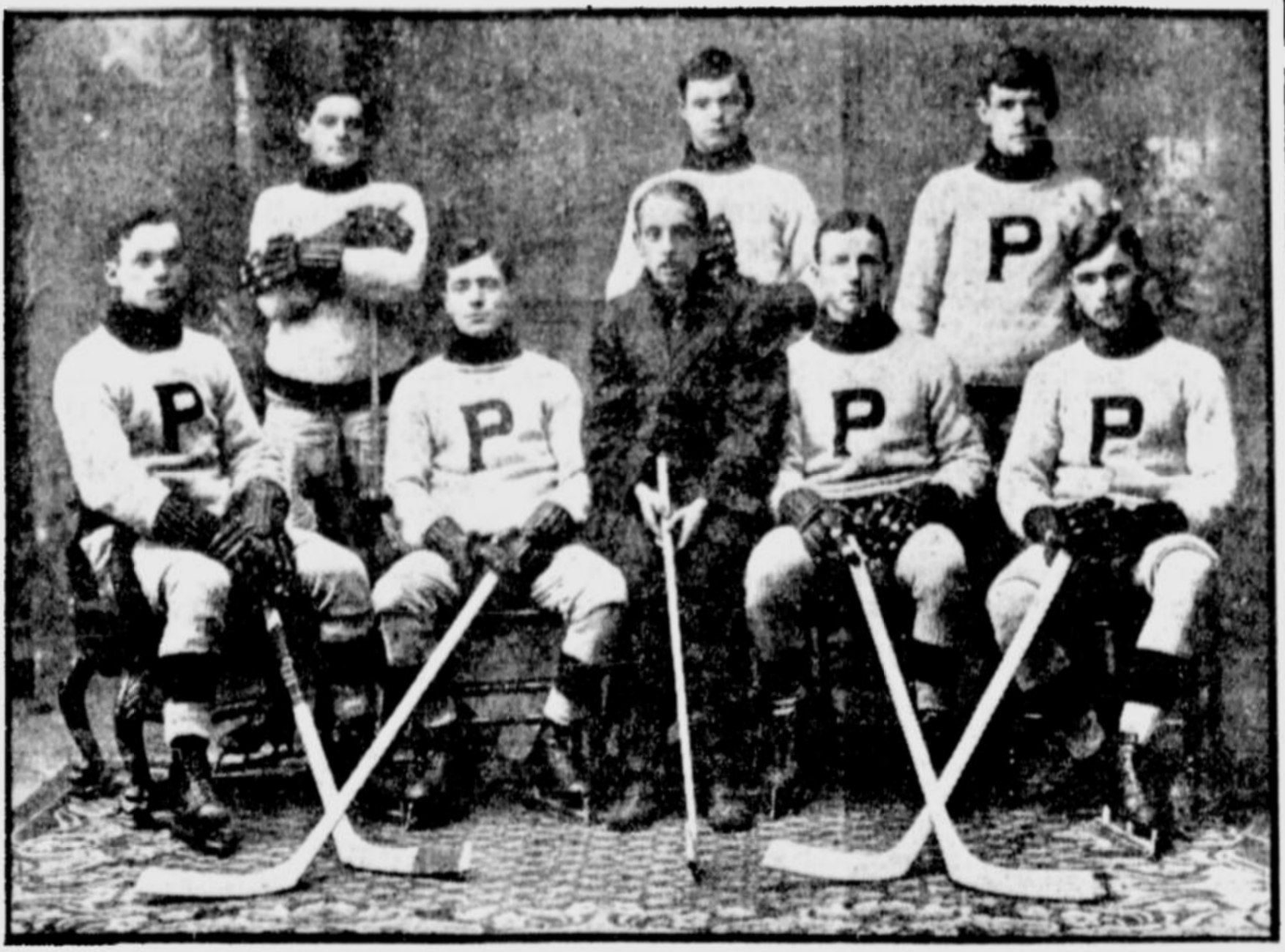
Nighbor, seated at far right, with the 1910–11 Pembroke Debaters. Harry Cameron is seated at far left.

Frank Nighbor began his career with the Pembroke Debaters in his hometown of Pembroke, playing in the Upper Ottawa Valley Hockey League (UOVHL) in 1910–11. While playing in the UOVHL Nighbor won the Citizen Shield, as champions of the Ottawa Valley, after Pembroke defeated Vankleek Hill 10 goals to 8 on March 1, 1911.

Nighbor first played professionally for the Port Arthur Bearcats of the Northern Ontario Hockey League (NOHL) in 1911. Fellow Pembroke native Harry Cameron was invited to play for Port Arthur but refused to go without Nighbor. The club agreed to bring Nighbor along, but they left him on the bench until injuries gave him an opportunity to play. He made the most of his opportunity by registering six goals in his first appearance.

In 1912, Nighbor joined the new Toronto Blueshirts of the NHA where he scored 25 goals in 18 games. He only played the one season in Toronto, jumping to the Vancouver Millionaires of the PCHA the following season for two seasons, and was an important member of the Millionaires team which won the Stanley Cup over the Ottawa Senators in 1915.

Nighbor returned east after the Stanley Cup series and joined the Senators, whom he would play for until 1930. He was an important part of the team's 1920s run, winning four more Cups in 1920, 1921, 1923, and 1927. He had his best season in 1916–17, scoring 41 goals in 19 games, finishing tied for the league lead with Joe Malone. In 1919–20 he scored 26 goals and had 15 assists in just 23 games, then had a further 6 goals in 5 playoff games and led the Senators to their first Cup in the NHL. Nighbor won the Stanley Cup again with Ottawa in 1921, 1923, and 1927.

Late in the 1925 season, Lady Byng, wife of the Governor-General of Canada Lord Julian Byng and an avid Senators fan, invited Nighbor to Rideau Hall after a game. She showed Nighbor an ornate trophy and asked him if he thought the NHL would accept it as an award for its most gentlemanly player. Nighbor said he thought it would be a good idea—and to his surprise, Lady Byng presented him the trophy on the spot, making him the first winner of the Lady Byng Trophy. A year earlier, he had been the first winner of the Hart Trophy.

In 1929–30, Nighbor was traded to the Toronto Maple Leafs, as part of the fire sale of the failing Senators, for Danny Cox and cash. He played 22 games for the Maple Leafs and retired in the off-season. In 1931–32 he made a brief comeback, playing one game for the Buffalo Bisons in the IHL.

== Playing style ==
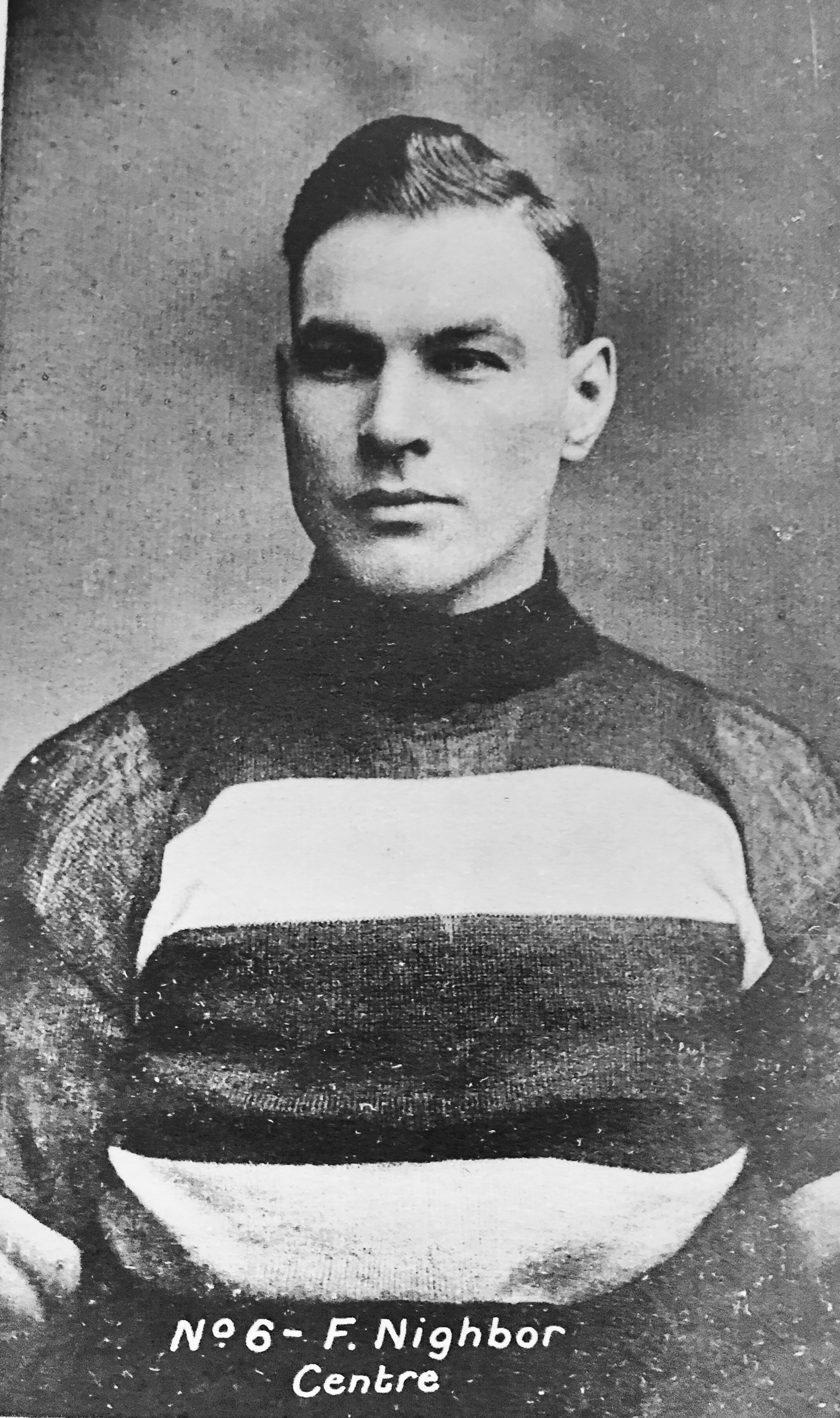
Nighbor with the Ottawa Senators in 1920

Nighbor was considered a master of the "sweep check," the act of laying the stick down flat on the ice and moving it in wide, circular motions, as well as the "poke check", an almost entirely different action, taking the puck off the opponent's stick. He was skilled and crafty with the puck and a good scorer. He impressed with his sportsmanship, inspiring Lady Byng to donate the Lady Byng Trophy in his honour to the "player adjudged to have exhibited the best type of sportsmanship and gentlemanly conduct combined with a high standard of playing ability", and she presented it personally to him. The February 25, 1916, issue of the Ottawa Citizen claimed that Nighbor, up to that point in his career, had never taken a major penalty and that most of his fouls were tripping penalties or accidental fouls related to his famous poke check.

Nighbor spent the majority of his playing career as a centre forward, but early on in his professional career, while with the Toronto Blueshirts and the Vancouver Millionaires, he was also deployed as a left winger.

"It was something awful those fellows cut loose. I thought we had them until Rowe was hurt, but the Ottawas had saved themselves and skated us off our feet in the third period. Nighbor had our line demoralized with his speed and poke check and no one could stop Darragh and Gerard."

— Seattle Metropolitans forward Frank Foyston on Nighbor and the Ottawa Senators after the 1920 Stanley Cup Final.

Outside of his strong stick techniques Nighbor also had good speed, and when the Ottawa Senators were at the top of the hockey world in the early 1920s they were known as a strong third-period threat who would run on all cylinders for all 60 minutes. Seattle Metropolitans star forward Frank Foyston gave high praise to Nighbor and the Senators after the 1920 Stanley Cup Final, where the Senators won the deciding fifth game of the series 6 goals to 1 after having scored five unanswered goals in the third period. Foyston said Nighbor had the Seattle forward line "demoralized with his speed and poke check."

In a 1960 interview with Bill Westwick (son of Harry "Rat" Westwick) of the Ottawa Journal, Nighbor claimed he had learned his famous poke checking technique from watching Port Arthur teammate Jack Walker, denying a claim from Jack Adams that he must have learned it from watching Fort William player Joel Rochon.

== Post-playing career ==
Nighbor coached the Buffalo Bisons and London Tecumsehs of the International League and the New York Rovers of the Eastern Amateur Hockey League. He would later turn to an insurance business he was a partner in and run it until he became ill. Nighbor died of cancer on April 13, 1966, in Pembroke at the age of 73. Nighbor was survived by four children: Frank Stanley, Patrick, Pauline and Catharine. Nighbor was married twice. His first wife died in 1930 of tuberculosis. His second wife died in 1950.

Nighbor was inducted into the Hockey Hall of Fame in 1947. He has also been inducted into the Canada Sports Hall of Fame and the Ottawa Sports Hall of Fame. In 1998, he was ranked number 100 on The Hockey News' list of the 100 Greatest Hockey Players. In March 2010, at a Quebec auction, an American collector paid $33,000 USD to secure Nighbor's game-worn Ottawa Senators sweater from the 1926–27 season. A street in Ottawa's Kanata neighbourhood is named in memory of Nighbor - "Frank Nighbor Place."

== Career statistics ==
=== Regular season and playoffs ===
			Regular season					Playoffs
Season	Team	League	GP	G	A	Pts	PIM	GP	G	A	Pts	PIM
1910–11	Pembroke Debaters	UOVHL	6	6	4	10	3	2	6	2	8	0
1911–12	Port Arthur Bearcats	NOHL	4	0	0	0	9	—	—	—	—	—
1912–13	Toronto Blueshirts	NHA	19	23	2	25	13	—	—	—	—	—
1912–13	NHA All-Stars	Exh.	5	6	–	6	–	—	—	—	—	—
1913–14	Vancouver Millionaires	PCHA	11	10	5	15	6	—	—	—	—	—
1914–15	Vancouver Millionaires	PCHA	17	23	7	30	12	—	—	—	—	—
1914–15	Vancouver Millionaires	St-Cup	—	—	—	—	—	3	4	6	10	6
1915–16	Ottawa Senators	NHA	23	19	5	24	26	—	—	—	—	—
1916–17	Ottawa Senators	NHA	19	41	10	51	24	2	1	1	2	6
1917–18	Ottawa Senators	NHL	10	11	8	19	6	—	—	—	—	—
1918–19	Ottawa Senators	NHL	18	19	9	28	27	2	0	2	2	3
1919–20	Ottawa Senators	NHL	23	26	15	41	18	—	—	—	—	—
1919–20	Ottawa Senators	St-Cup	—	—	—	—	—	5	6	1	7	2
1920–21	Ottawa Senators	NHL	24	19	10	29	10	2	1	3	4	2
1920–21	Ottawa Senators	St-Cup	—	—	—	—	—	5	0	1	1	0
1921–22	Ottawa Senators	NHL	20	8	10	18	4	2	2	1	3	4
1922–23	Ottawa Senators	NHL	22	11	7	18	14	2	0	1	1	0
1922–23	Ottawa Senators	St-Cup	—	—	—	—	—	6	1	1	2	10
1923–24	Ottawa Senators	NHL	20	11	6	17	16	2	0	1	1	0
1924–25	Ottawa Senators	NHL	26	5	5	10	18	—	—	—	—	—
1925–26	Ottawa Senators	NHL	35	12	13	25	40	2	0	0	0	2
1926–27	Ottawa Senators	NHL	38	6	6	12	26	6	1	1	2	0
1927–28	Ottawa Senators	NHL	42	8	5	13	46	2	0	0	0	2
1928–29	Ottawa Senators	NHL	30	1	4	5	22	—	—	—	—	—
1929–30	Ottawa Senators	NHL	19	0	0	0	0	—	—	—	—	—
1929–30	Toronto Maple Leafs	NHL	22	2	0	2	2	—	—	—	—	—
1931–32	Buffalo Bisons	IHL	1	0	0	0	0	—	—	—	—	—
NHA totals			61	83	17	100	63	2	1	1	2	6
St-Cup totals			—	—	—	—	—	19	11	9	20	18
NHL totals			349	139	98	237	249	20	4	9	13	13

== Achievements ==
- Stanley Cup – 1915 (with Vancouver), 1920, 1921, 1923, 1927 (with Ottawa)
- Hart Trophy – 1924
- Lady Byng Trophy – 1925, 1926
- NHA scoring leader – 1916–17

== Notes ==
Preceded by New Award	Winner of the Hart Trophy; 1924	Succeeded by Billy Burch
Preceded by New Award	Winner of the Lady Byng Trophy; 1925, 1926	Succeeded by Billy Burch
