= Frank Foyston =

Canadian ice hockey player and coach (1891–1966)

- Hockey Hall of Fame, 1958
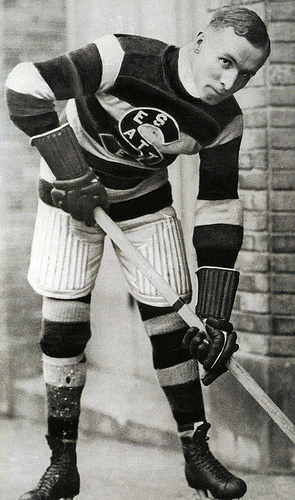
- Foyston with the Seattle Metropolitans
- Born: February 2, 1891 Minesing, Ontario, Canada
- Died: January 19, 1966 (aged 74) Seattle, Washington, U.S.
- Height: 5 ft 9 in (175 cm)
- Weight: 158 lb (72 kg; 11 st 4 lb)
- Position: Centre
- Shot: Left
- Played for: Detroit Olympics; Detroit Cougars; Victoria Cougars; Seattle Metropolitans; Toronto Blueshirts
- Playing career: 1912–1930

Frank Corbett "Flash" Foyston (February 2, 1891 – January 19, 1966) was a Canadian professional ice hockey player and coach. Foyston was a member of Stanley Cup championship teams three times: with the Toronto Blueshirts in 1914, the Seattle Metropolitans in 1917, and the Victoria Cougars in 1925. While with the Metropolitans, he twice led the Pacific Coast Hockey Association (PCHA) in goals. His performance in the 1919 Stanley Cup Final set or tied 7 NHL records that remain unbroken over a century later. After his retirement from playing, Foyston became a minor league head coach. He was inducted into the Hockey Hall of Fame in 1958.

== Career ==
=== Early career ===
Foyston was born in Minesing, Ontario, in 1891. From 1908 to 1910, he played for the Barrie Athletic Club in the OHA Jr. league. In 1908–09, he scored 17 goals in 6 games. In 1910–11, Foyston played for the Barrie Athletic Club in the OHA Sr. league and scored 14 goals in 6 games. The following season, he played for the Toronto Eaton's, scoring 15 goals in 6 games in the regular season and 5 goals in 4 games in the playoffs. At the end of the 1911–12 season the Eaton's challenged the Winnipeg Victorias for the Allan Cup, as amateur champions of Canada, but the Toronto club was defeated over two games by an aggregate score of 5–24 (4–8, 1–16), and Foyston went scoreless in the series.

=== Toronto Blueshirts ===
Foyston began his professional hockey career with the National Hockey Association's Toronto Blueshirts in 1912–13. In his first season with Toronto, he scored 8 goals in 16 games, and the Blueshirts finished fourth overall in the NHA standings. The following season, in 1913–14, he scored 16 goals in 19 regular season games, and one goal in two NHA playoff games against the Montreal Canadiens, to help the Blueshirts win the NHA championship and claim the Stanley Cup. In the 1914 Stanley Cup Final against the PCHA's Victoria Aristocrats, Foyston scored two goals, including the series-clincher for Toronto. The following season, in 1914–15, Foyston had 13 goals and 9 assists in 20 games, and Toronto finished fourth in the league standings.

=== Seattle Metropolitans ===
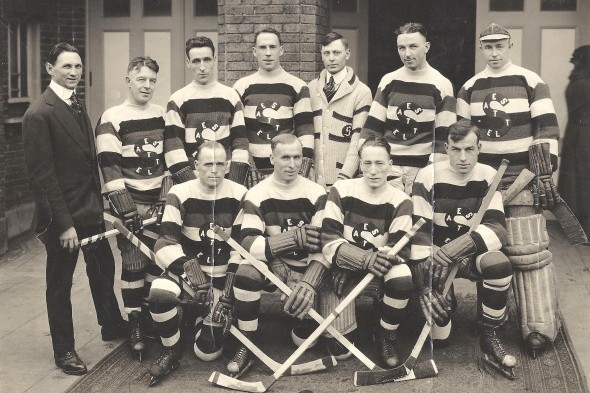
Foyston (front row, second from left) with the Seattle Metropolitans, circa 1919–21

At the beginning of the 1915–16 season, Foyston signed with the PCHA's Seattle Metropolitans – along with his Toronto teammates Hap Holmes, Eddie Carpenter, Jack Walker, and Cully Wilson – where he would play for nine seasons, leading the league in goals twice. In his first season with Seattle, he had 13 points in 18 games. The following season, in 1916–17, he had 36 goals and 12 assists in 24 games. Seattle played in the 1917 Stanley Cup Final against the Montreal Canadiens, and Foyston scored seven goals and added three assists to help the Metropolitans win the Stanley Cup in four games. It was the first time an American team had won the Stanley Cup. At the end of the season, Foyston was voted the "Champion All-Around Hockey Player" in the PCHA.

Foyston was conscripted into the Canadian Expeditionary Force on April 2, 1918, as part of the First World War, however after a month he was released to join the Royal Flying Corps. However he did not serve overseas, and with the war over in November 1918 returned to hockey without missing much time.

In 1918–19, Foyston scored 15 goals in 18 regular season games, and three goals in two playoff games, as Seattle advanced to the 1919 Stanley Cup Final against the Canadiens. Foyston scored nine goals in five games before the series was abandoned (with the teams tied at 2–2 in a best-of-five series format) due to the influenza epidemic. The Stanley Cup was not awarded that year. The following season, in 1919–20, Foyston scored 26 goals in 22 regular season games, and three goals in two playoff games, as Seattle advanced to the 1920 Stanley Cup Final. In the Finals, he had six goals in five games.

=== Victoria and Detroit ===
Foyston played with Seattle until 1924. After the franchise folded, he signed with the Victoria Cougars of the Western Canada Hockey League. In 1924–25, he had 11 points in 27 regular season games, and two points in four playoff games. In the 1925 Stanley Cup Final against the Montreal Canadiens, Foyston scored one goal in four games to help the Cougars become the last non-NHL team to win the Stanley Cup. He also played in the 1926 Stanley Cup Final the following year with the Cougars, but had no points as the Cougars lost to the Montreal Maroons. The Victoria franchise was purchased by the National Hockey League's Detroit Cougars, and Foyston played for the team during the next two seasons.

=== Coaching ===
In 1928–29, Foyston was a player-coach for the Detroit Olympics of the Canadian Professional Hockey League. He had 24 points in 42 regular season games and led the team to a 27-10-5 record. His playing career ended after the season. In 1930–31, he coached the Syracuse Stars, and in 1931–32, he coached the Bronx Tigers. Foyston then became the first coach and general manager of the Seattle Seahawks of the North West Hockey League. In 1934–35, he led the Seahawks to a 20-9-3 record and a first-place finish, but the team lost in the playoffs.

== Legacy and playing style ==
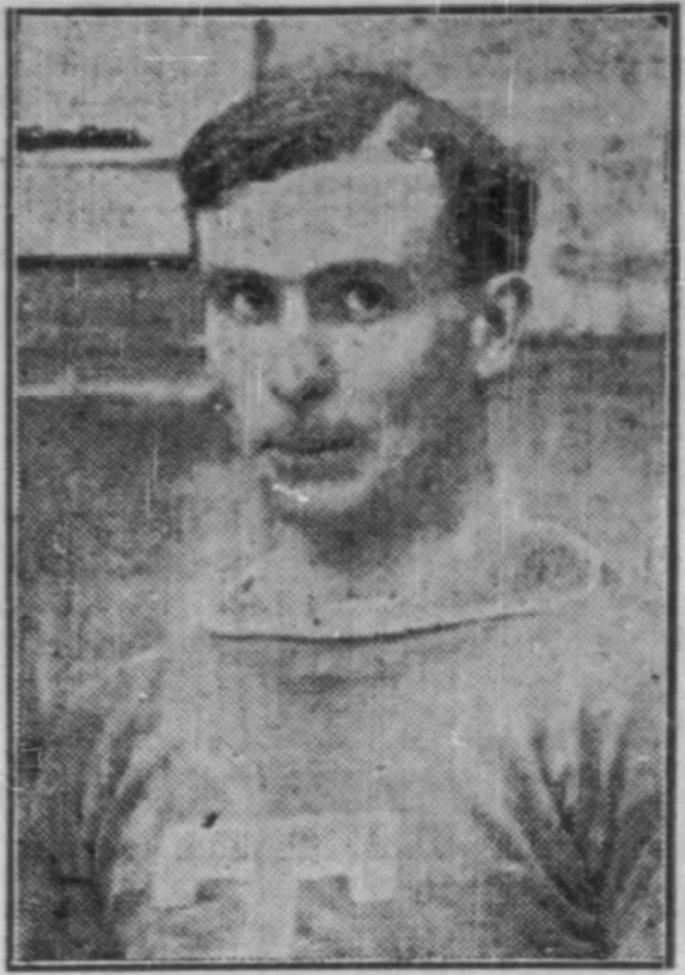
Foyston with Toronto Blueshirts.

Foyston is one of 11 players who have won the Stanley Cup with three or more different franchises. Two of the other players who accomplished the same feat were teammates of Foyston on all three of his Stanley Cup wins: goaltender Hap Holmes and forward Jack Walker.

Foyston was a versatile forward capable of playing well at centre, left and right wing, and rover. He brought much speed to the game and was often referred to as either "Flash" or "Blonde Flash" in the newspapers due to his fleet-footedness combined with his fair-colored hair. Vancouver based newspaper The Province, in January 1921, claimed that Foyston "is a wonderful combination player, a good stickhandler and shoots a wicked puck" but added "on backchecking there are half a dozen players who outshine him."

In 1958 Foyston was elected to the Hockey Hall of Fame.

Foyston died in Seattle, Washington, in 1966. He is buried at Evergreen Washelli Memorial Park in Seattle.

== Career statistics ==
=== Regular season and playoffs ===
			Regular season					Playoffs
Season	Team	League	GP	G	A	Pts	PIM	GP	G	A	Pts	PIM
1908–09	Barrie Athletic Club	OHA	6	17	0	17	9	—	—	—	—	—
1909–10	Barrie Athletic Club	OHA	—	—	—	—	—	—	—	—	—	—
1910–11	Barrie Athletic Club	OHA	6	14	0	14	—	—	—	—	—	—
1911–12	Toronto Eaton's	TMHL	6	15	0	15	—	4	5	0	5	9
1911–12	Toronto Eaton's	Al-Cup	—	—	—	—	—	2	0	—	0	—
1912–13	Toronto Blueshirts	NHA	16	8	0	8	8	—	—	—	—	—
1913–14	Toronto Blueshirts	NHA	19	16	2	18	8	2	1	0	1	0
1913–14	Toronto Blueshirts	St-Cup	—	—	—	—	—	3	2	0	2	3
1914–15	Toronto Blueshirts	NHA	20	13	9	22	11	—	—	—	—	—
1915–16	Toronto Blueshirts	NHA	1	0	0	0	0	—	—	—	—	—
1915–16	Seattle Metropolitans	PCHA	18	9	4	13	6	—	—	—	—	—
1916–17	Seattle Metropolitans	PCHA	24	36	12	48	51	—	—	—	—	—
1916–17	Seattle Metropolitans	St-Cup	—	—	—	—	—	4	7	3	10	3
1917–18	Seattle Metropolitans	PCHA	13	9	5	14	9	2	0	0	0	3
1918–19	Seattle Metropolitans	PCHA	18	15	4	19	0	2	3	0	3	0
1918–19	Seattle Metropolitans	St-Cup	—	—	—	—	—	5	9	1	10	0
1919–20	Seattle Metropolitans	PCHA	22	26	3	29	3	2	3	1	4	0
1919–20	Seattle Metropolitans	St-Cup	—	—	—	—	—	5	6	1	7	7
1920–21	Seattle Metropolitans	PCHA	23	26	4	30	10	2	1	0	1	0
1921–22	Seattle Metropolitans	PCHA	24	16	7	23	25	2	0	0	0	3
1922–23	Seattle Metropolitans	PCHA	30	20	8	28	21	—	—	—	—	—
1923–24	Seattle Metropolitans	PCHA	30	17	6	23	8	2	1	0	1	3
1924–25	Victoria Cougars	WCHL	27	6	5	11	6	4	1	1	2	2
1924–25	Victoria Cougars	St-Cup	—	—	—	—	—	4	1	0	1	0
1925–26	Victoria Cougars	WHL	12	6	3	9	8	3	2	0	2	4
1925–26	Victoria Cougars	St-Cup	—	—	—	—	—	4	0	0	0	2
1926–27	Detroit Cougars	NHL	41	10	5	15	16	—	—	—	—	—
1927–28	Detroit Olympics	Can-Pro	19	3	2	5	14	—	—	—	—	—
1927–28	Detroit Cougars	NHL	23	7	2	9	16	—	—	—	—	—
1928–29	Detroit Olympics	Can-Pro	42	18	6	24	20	7	0	0	0	9
1929–30	Detroit Olympics	IHL	31	2	1	3	6	3	0	0	0	0
NHA totals			56	37	11	48	27	2	1	0	1	0
PCHA totals			202	174	53	227	133	12	8	1	9	6
St-Cup totals			—	—	—	—	—	25	25	5	30	15

== NHL Records (7) ==
- Most points, playoff period: 4 (tied with 19 other players) March 24, 1919
- Most goals, Stanley Cup Final series: 9 (tied with Babe Dye and Cyclone Taylor) 1919 Stanley Cup Final
- Most goals, Stanley Cup Final game: 4 (tied with four other players) March 24, 1919
- Most goals, Stanley Cup Final period: 3 (tied with eight other players) March 24, 1919
- Most points, Stanley Cup Final game: 5 (tied with six other players) March 24, 1919
- Most points, Stanley Cup Final period: 4 (tied with Mitch Marner) on March 24, 1919
- Most hat tricks, Stanley Cup Final series: 2 in the 1919 Stanley Cup Final
