= Bernie Morris =

Canadian ice hockey player

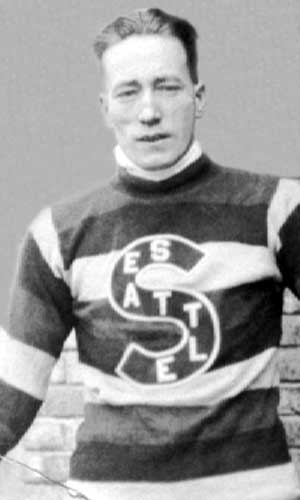
- Morris with the Seattle Metropolitans
- Born: August 21, 1890 Brandon, Manitoba, Canada
- Died: May 16, 1963 (aged 72) Bremerton, Washington, United States
- Height: 5 ft 7 in (170 cm)
- Weight: 145 lb (66 kg; 10 st 5 lb)
- Position: Centre
- Shot: Right
- Played for: Regina Capitals; Boston Bruins; Calgary Tigers; Seattle Metropolitans; Victoria Aristocrats
- Playing career: 1910–1930

Bernard Patrick Morris (August 21, 1890 – May 16, 1963) was a Canadian professional ice hockey player. He played for the Seattle Metropolitans of the Pacific Coast Hockey Association (PCHA) from 1915 to 1923. When the Metropolitans became the first U.S.-based team to win the Stanley Cup in 1917, Morris scored 14 of Seattle's goals (in a best-of-five series). Morris also played for the Calgary Tigers, Boston Bruins, and various minor league teams.

== Playing career ==
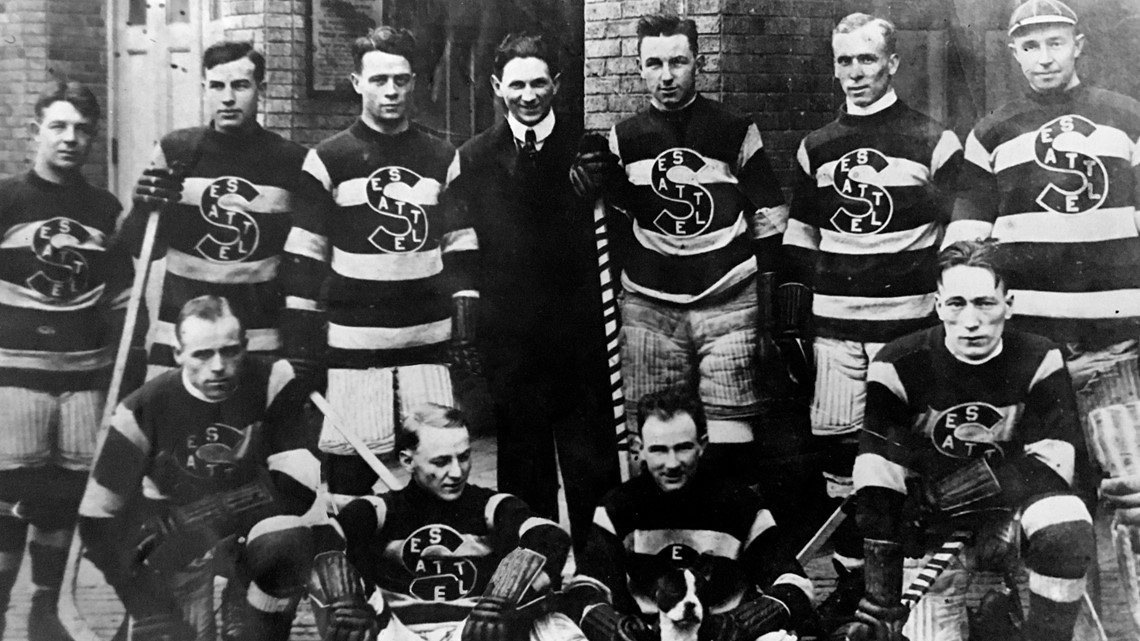
Morris (front row, far right) with the 1917 Seattle Metropolitans

Born in Brandon, Manitoba, Morris played for several senior teams in Manitoba, Saskatchewan and British Columbia before joining the Victoria Aristocrats of the PCHA in 1914. He moved over to the Seattle Metropolitans the following season, played eight seasons for Seattle, and was a member of the Stanley Cup champion 1917 team. He had an outstanding 1917 series, scoring 14 goals in four games.

Morris was scheduled to play in the ill-fated 1919 series, but was arrested by the United States for alleged draft dodging and jailed. He received a sentence of two years, to be served at Alcatraz. The fact that he was a British subject did not stop the American authorities from arresting him, as by treaty, he was supposed to register for the draft (then claim exemption), but he neglected to attend his physical, thus making him the "first foreign national on the West Coast convicted of draft evasion." By fall he was transferred to an Army unit and in March 1920 granted an honourable discharge.

Morris returned to hockey after the 1919–20 season and played in the 1920 series for Seattle.

In October 1923, Morris was traded by Seattle to the Calgary Tigers. He played for the Tigers in the 1924 series against Montreal. In all, Morris played a season and a half with Calgary before being traded again. He was traded to the Montreal Maroons and then to the Boston Bruins of the National Hockey League (NHL) on January 3, 1925. He was released by Boston in February 1925, and he returned west to play for the Regina Capitals.

From 1925 to 1930, Morris finished his career with various teams in the minor California Pro League, Can-Pro, and International League. Morris managed the Hamilton Tigers during the 1928–1929 and 1929–1930 seasons. He made his home in Hamilton, Ontario and did not move to Syracuse when the team was transferred there in 1930.

== Career statistics ==
=== Regular season and playoffs ===
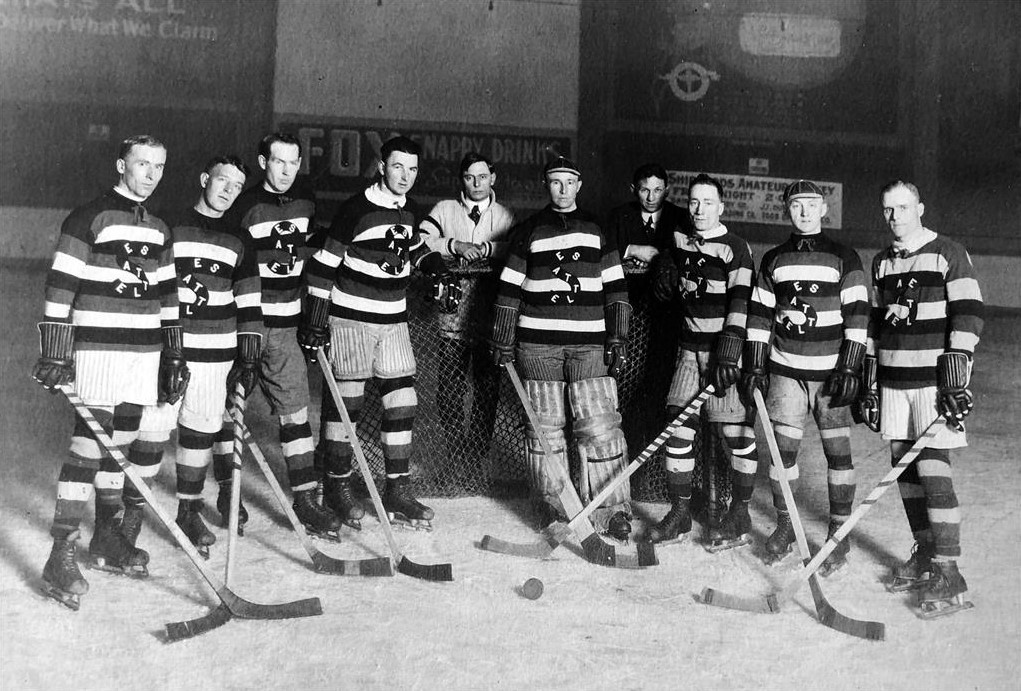
Morris (third from right) with the 1919 Seattle Metropolitans

			Regular season					Playoffs
Season	Team	League	GP	G	A	Pts	PIM	GP	G	A	Pts	PIM
1910–11	Brandon Shamrocks	MIPHL	6	6	0	6	—	—	—	—	—	—
1911–12	Moose Jaw Brewers	Sask-Pro	8	21	0	21	—	—	—	—	—	—
1912–13	Phoenix Hockey Club	BDHL	4	10	1	11	—	4	5	3	8	—
1913–14	Phoenix Hockey Club	BDHL	10	4	0	4	4	—	—	—	—	—
1913–14	Regina Victorias	S-SSHL	1	2	0	2	3	—	—	—	—	—
1914–15	Victoria Aristocrats	PCHA	10	7	3	10	0	—	—	—	—	—
1915–16	Seattle Metropolitans	PCHA	18	23	9	32	27	—	—	—	—	—
1915–16	PCHA All-Stars	Exhib	3	7	3	10	0	—	—	—	—	—
1916–17	Seattle Metropolitans	PCHA	24	37	17	54	17	—	—	—	—	—
1916–17	Seattle Metropolitans	St-Cup	—	—	—	—	—	4	14	2	16	0
1917–18	Seattle Metropolitans	PCHA	18	20	12	32	9	2	1	0	1	0
1918–19	Seattle Metropolitans	PCHA	20	22	7	29	15	—	—	—	—	—
1919–20	Seattle Metropolitans	St-Cup	—	—	—	—	—	5	0	2	2	0
1920–21	Seattle Metropolitans	PCHA	24	11	13	24	3	2	1	0	1	0
1921–22	Seattle Metropolitans	PCHA	24	14	10	24	36	2	0	0	0	0
1922–23	Seattle Metropolitans	PCHA	29	21	5	26	30	—	—	—	—	—
1923–24	Calgary Tigers	WCHL	30	16	7	23	13	2	1	1	2	4
1923–24	Calgary Tigers	W-PO	—	—	—	—	—	3	2	4	6	4
1923–24	Calgary Tigers	St-Cup	—	—	—	—	—	2	0	1	1	0
1924–25	Calgary Tigers	WCHL	7	2	0	2	2	—	—	—	—	—
1924–25	Boston Bruins	NHL	6	1	0	1	0	—	—	—	—	—
1924–25	Regina Capitals	WCHL	7	1	2	3	2	—	—	—	—	—
1925–26	Los Angeles Palais de Glace	Cal-Pro	10	10	9	19	8	—	—	—	—	—
1926–27	Edmonton Eskimos	PrHL	27	18	6	24	28	—	—	—	—	—
1927–28	Detroit Olympics	Can-Pro	37	16	9	25	35	2	0	0	0	6
1928–29	Hamilton Tigers	Can-Pro	12	3	2	5	14	—	—	—	—	—
1929–30	Hamilton Tigers	IHL	17	3	3	6	12	—	—	—	—	—
PCHA totals			167	155	76	231	137	6	2	0	2	0
St-Cup totals			—	—	—	—	—	11	14	5	19	0
NHL totals			6	1	0	1	0	—	—	—	—	—

== Awards ==
- PCHA First All-Star team: 1916, 1917, 1918, 1919, 1922
- PCHA Second All-Star team: 1921, 1923
