= 1920 Stanley Cup Final =

1920 ice hockey championship series

	1	2	3	4	5	Total
Ottawa Senators (NHL)	3	3	1	2	6	3
Seattle Metropolitans (PCHA)	2	0	3	5	1	2
- Location(s): Ottawa: The Arena (1–3); Toronto: Arena Gardens (4, 5)
- Format: best-of-five
- Coaches: Ottawa: Pete Green; Seattle: Pete Muldoon
- Referees: Cooper Smeaton
- Dates: March 22 – April 1, 1920
- Series-winning goal: Jack Darragh (5:00, third)
- Hall of Famers: Senators: Clint Benedict (1965); Georges Boucher (1960); Punch Broadbent (1962); Sprague Cleghorn (1958); Jack Darragh (1962); Cy Denneny (1959); Eddie Gerard (1945); Frank Nighbor (1947); Metropolitans: Frank Foyston (1958); Hap Holmes (1972); Jack Walker (1960)

The 1920 Stanley Cup Final was contested by the National Hockey League (NHL) champion Ottawa Senators and the Pacific Coast Hockey Association (PCHA) champion Seattle Metropolitans. The Senators won the series by three games to two in the best-of-five game series. Although all of the games for the series were scheduled to be played at The Arena in Ottawa, unseasonably warm weather and poor ice conditions forced the last two contests to be played on the artificial ice at Toronto's Arena Gardens.

This would be the last Stanley Cup Final appearance for a team based on the West Coast of the United States until the 1993 Stanley Cup Final. It is the last Finals appearance by a Seattle-based team to date.

== Paths to the Finals ==
The Senators captured the 1919–20 NHL title after they won both halves of the regular season, thus eliminating the need for a league championship playoff. Meanwhile, Seattle finished the 1919–20 PCHA regular season in first place with a 12–10 record, but had to defeat the second place Vancouver Millionaires in a two-game total goals championship series, 7–3, to win the PCHA title.

The location of the series was under dispute. As the 1919 series was not completed, the PCHA wanted the 1920 series to take place out west. The NHL opposed the idea. The PCHA proposed playing the series in Winnipeg, but this was still not agreed to by the NHL. While the dispute continued, the schedules for both leagues was allowed to drag out, leading to a late starting date for the Finals.

== Game summaries ==
Seattle's green, red, and white uniforms looked almost alike to Ottawa's black, red, and white uniforms. The Senators agreed to play in white sweaters. The rules alternated for each game, starting with eastern rules.

The puck was dropped for the first game of the series by Stanley Cup trustee William Foran to the centers Frank Nighbor and Frank Foyston. The ice became soft and pools of water developed. Foyston scored two goals in the first period to put Seattle ahead 2–0. Nighbor scored on a shot that ricocheted off Morris of Seattle with 40 seconds to play in the second period. Nighbor tied it at the ten-minute mark of the third period. Jack Darragh scored the game-winning goal with four minutes to play on an assist from Eddie Gerard.

Vancouver Mayor Robert Gale dropped the puck to start game two, played under seven-man PCHA rules. Goaltender Clint Benedict led the Senators to a 3–0 shutout win. Ice conditions were again wet. Darragh scored at the 14-minute mark of the first period. In the third, Gerard stick-handled in and scored after six minutes. Nighbor finished the scoring with his third goal of the series with one minute to play.rom

Before game three, snow was placed onto the natural ice to make the ice harder and removed prior to the game. The ice softened, however, as the game progressed. Seattle won game three, 3–1, in a game notable for having no penalties called. Seattle outplayed Ottawa but the score was kept close by Benedict. The first goal was scored at five minutes of the first, by George Boucher to put Ottawa ahead 1–0. Riley of Seattle scored to tie the game with two minutes to play in the first. Seattle took the lead on a goal by Foyston, after a steal by Walker from Darragh. The final goal was scored by Rickey on another set-up by Walker.

By consensus of league and team officials, the series was shifted to Toronto because of Ottawa's slushy ice conditions (The Ottawa Arena did not have artificial ice). Ottawa objected, but NHL president Frank Calder stood firm.

In game four Foyston scored after three minutes to give the Mets a lead which they did not relinquish. Rowe scored at the eight-minute mark to put the Mets ahead 2-0. In the second period, Nighbor scored after two minutes to draw Ottawa close. At the 6:55 mark, Walker scored on a back-hand to put Seattle again two goals ahead, before Nighbor scored his second to make the score 3–2 after two periods. Seattle scored twice in the third to win the game 5–2 and even the series.

In the fifth game, Rowe scored after ten minutes to put Seattle ahead 1–0, but Ottawa scored the next six to win the game 6–1. Boucher scored four minutes after Rowe to tie the score after one period. The score remained 1–1 after two periods. Darragh then scored after five minutes of the third to put Ottawa ahead. Gerard stick-handled through the Seattle team to put Ottawa ahead 3–1 three minutes later. Darragh then scored twice within a minute to record a hat-trick. Nighbor scored to finish the scoring.

Seattle forward Frank Foyston had high praise for the Ottawa team after the series had concluded, and gave credit to all of Frank Nighbor, Jack Darragh and Eddie Gerard on the Senators forward line:

"It was something awful those fellows cut loose. I thought we had them until Rowe was hurt, but the Ottawas had saved themselves and skated us off our feet in the third period. Nighbor had our line demoralized with his speed and poke check and no one could stop Darragh and Gerard. Darragh scored three goals in as many minutes, and Harry Holmes afterwards told me he could see three our four Darraghs on the ice, the way the big Ottawa forward was galloping up and down. That guy isn't human when he gets his blood up. We were all sorry to lose, but we were beaten by a wonderful team. They're a credit to the game."

— Seattle Metropolitans forward Frank Foyston on the Ottawa Senators after the 1920 Stanley Cup Final.

For the series, Nighbor led in goals with six, while Foyston and Darragh scored five. Benedict recorded a 2.20 goals against average (GAA) during the series. Hap Holmes recorded a 3.00 GAA. It was Holmes' fourth consecutive Stanley Cup Final, and his fifth to that point (1914, 1917, 1918, 1919, 1920). Each Senator received $390.19 in prize money, while each Metropolitan received $319.39.

March 22	Seattle Metropolitans	2–3	Ottawa Senators	The Arena	Recap
Frank Foyston (1) – 10:25		First period	No scoring
Frank Foyston (2) – 06:45		Second period	14:15 – Frank Nighbor (1)
No scoring		Third period	10:00 – Frank Nighbor (2); 16:00 – Jack Darragh (1)
Hap Holmes		Goalie stats	Clint Benedict

March 24	Seattle Metropolitans	0–3	Ottawa Senators	The Arena	Recap
No scoring		First period	14:00 – Jack Darragh (2)
No scoring		Second period	No scoring
No scoring		Third period	06:00 – Eddie Gerard (1); 19:00 – Frank Nighbor (3)
Hap Holmes		Goalie stats	Clint Benedict

March 27	Seattle Metropolitans	3–1	Ottawa Senators	The Arena	Recap
Frank Foyston (3) – 09:00		First period	06:00 – Buck Boucher (1)
Frank Foyston (4) – 12:00		Second period	No scoring
Roy Rickey (1) – 09:30		Third period	No scoring
Hap Holmes		Goalie stats	Clint Benedict

March 30	Ottawa Senators	2–5	Seattle Metropolitans	Mutual Street Arena	Recap
No scoring		First period	03:00 – Frank Foyston (5); 08:00 – Bobby Rowe (1)
Frank Nighbor (4) – 02:00; Frank Nighbor (5) – 11:00		Second period	08:00 – Jack Walker (1)
No scoring		Third period	02:00 – Roy Rickey (2); 05:00 – Frank Foyston (6)
Clint Benedict		Goalie stats	Hap Holmes

April 1	Ottawa Senators	6–1	Seattle Metropolitans	Mutual Street Arena	Recap
Buck Boucher (2) – 14:00		First period	10:00 – Bobby Rowe (2)
No scoring		Second period	No scoring
Jack Darragh (3) – 05:00; Eddie Gerard (2) – 10:00; Jack Darragh (3) – 13:00; Jack Darragh (4) – 14:00; Frank Nighbor (6) – 14:30		Third period	No scoring
Clint Benedict		Goalie stats	Hap Holmes

Ottawa won series 3–2

== Stanley Cup engraving ==
The 1920 Stanley Cup was presented by the trophy's trustee William Foran. The Senators never did engrave their name on the Cup for their championship season.

It was not until the trophy was redesigned in 1948 that the words "1920 Ottawa Senators" was put onto its then-new collar.

The following Senators players and staff were members of the Stanley Cup winning team.

1919–20 Ottawa Senators

=== Players ===
Centres

- 9 Frank Nighbor

Wingers

- 5 Eddie Gerard – (Captain)^
- 3 Jack MacKell^
- 4 George Buck Boucher‡
- 6 Jack Darragh (Sub-Goalie)
- 7 Harry Punch Broadbent
- 8 Cy Denneny

Defencemen

- 2 Sprague Cleghorn
- 10 Morley Bruce
- 11 Horace Merrill

Goaltenders

- 1 Clint Benedict

=== Coaching and administrative staff ===
- Edwin Ted Dey, (President/Owner)
- Frank Ahearn, (Hon. President/Owner)
- Tommy Gorman, (Manager/Secretary/Owner)
- Pete Green, (Coach)
- Frank Dolan, (Trainer)
- Lorne Graham, (Team Doctor)
- ‡ Played rover position in the Stanley Cup Final. ^-also played Defence
- & Missing from the team picture.

== See also ==
- 1919–20 NHL season
- 1919–20 PCHA season

Preceded by (no 1919 champion)	Ottawa Senators; Stanley Cup champions 1920	Succeeded by Ottawa Senators; 1921
