= 1917 Stanley Cup Final =

1917 ice hockey championship series

	1	2	3	4	Total
Seattle Metropolitans (PCHA)	4	6	4	9	3
Montreal Canadiens (NHA)	8	1	1	1	1
- Location(s): Seattle: Seattle Ice Arena
- Format: best-of-five
- Coaches: Seattle: Pete Muldoon; Montreal: George Kennedy
- Dates: March 17–26, 1917
- Series-winning goal: Bernie Morris (7:55, first)
- Hall of Famers: Metropolitans: Frank Foyston (1958); Hap Holmes (1972); Jack Walker (1960); Canadiens: Newsy Lalonde (1950); Jack Laviolette (1963); Reg Noble (1962); Didier Pitre (1963); Tommy Smith (1973); Georges Vezina (1945); Coaches: Newsy Lalonde (1950, player)

The 1917 Stanley Cup Final was contested by the Pacific Coast Hockey Association (PCHA) champion Seattle Metropolitans and the National Hockey Association (NHA) and Stanley Cup defending champion Montreal Canadiens. Seattle defeated Montreal three games to one in a best-of-five-game series to become the first team from the United States to win the Cup. The series was also the first Stanley Cup Final to be played in the United States, and the last Stanley Cup Final to not feature a National Hockey League team, as the NHA rebranded as the NHL in November 1917. This was the first major professional sports championship ever won by a Seattle-based team.

== Paths to the Final ==
Seattle won the PCHA title after finishing the 1916–17 regular season in first place with a 16–8 record. Meanwhile, Montreal, who was the champion of the first half of the NHA season, advanced to the final series after narrowly defeating the Ottawa Senators, 7–6, in a two-game total-goals playoff series to end the 1916–17 NHA season.

== Game summaries ==
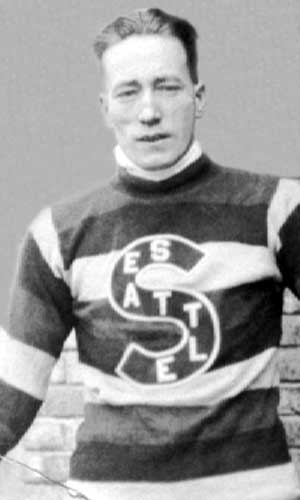
Bernie Morris

The games of the Final were played at the Seattle Ice Arena. Games one and three were played under PCHA seven-man rules; games two and four were played under NHA six-man rules. Bernie Morris scored 14 of Seattle's 23 total goals for the series, including six in their 9–1 victory in game four. Future Hockey Hall of Fame goaltender Hap Holmes recorded a 2.90 goals-against average for the Mets.

Montreal Canadiens NHA champion roster - George Vezina goalie, Bert Corbeau defence, Harry Mummery defence, Edouard "Newsy" Lalonde (Captain) Center-Rover Tommy Smith center, Didier Pitre right wing, Reginald "Reg" Noble left wing, Jack Laviolette left wing, Louis Berlinguette left wing, Wilfred "Billy" Coutu defence spares - Sarsfield "Steve" Malone center, George "Skinner" Poulin center, Jules Rochon - defence Harold "Hal" McNamara defence Dave Majors defence, Arthur Brooks defence, Joe Maltais right wing, U.P. Boulder (President), George "Kennedy" Kendall (Owner/Manager-Coach),

Seattle Metropolitans PCHA champion roster - Harry "Happy" Holmes goalie, Roy Rickey defence, Everard "Ed" Carpenter defence, Jack Walker rover-right wing, Bernie Morris center, Frank Foyston (Captain) left wings, Jim Riley left wing, Bobby "Stubby" Rowe defence, Carol "Cully" Wilson right wing, Pete Muldoon (Owner/Manager-Coach).

Game one

In game one, Didier Pitre scored four goals as he led the Canadiens to an 8–4 victory. Pitre opened the scoring in the third minute before Morris tied it four minutes later. Jack Laviolette scored twenty seconds later to put the Canadiens ahead, followed by Pitre to put the Canadiens ahead 3–1 after one period. Con Corbeau and Newsy Lalonde scored in the second to put the Canadiens ahead 5–1 after two periods. In the third, Morris and Frank Foyston scored to bring Seattle within two goals, before Pitre scored again. Morris scored to make it 6–4 before Pitre and Corbeau scored to make the final score 8–4.

Game two

Seattle tied the series with a convincing win played under NHA hockey rules. Morris opened the scoring at nine minutes of the first period. Wilson scored to make it 2–0 for Seattle after the first period. Morris and Foyston scored in the second to put Seattle up 4–0 after two periods. Frank Foyston then scored twice in the third period to complete his hat trick and give Seattle a lead of 6–0. Seattle then played defensively but Tommy Smith scored in the final minutes for the Canadiens to spoil the shutout. Frustration boiled over at the start of the third period with a fight between Roy Rickey and Billy Coutu before Harry Mummery jumped into the fray.

Game three

The game was played at a fast clip with no goals before Morris scored after ten minutes. Montreal's goaltender Georges Vézina made several big saves in the second to hold Seattle off from scoring. Coutu and Rickey had their third fight of the series and Coutu was given a twenty-minute penalty and Rickey a ten-minute period. The Canadiens held off Seattle in an ensuing power play to end the second with Seattle holding a one-goal lead. In the third, Foyston scored after five minutes and Morris scored a quick pair of goals to give Seattle a 4–0 lead.

Game four

In an individual rush, Morris put the Mets ahead early in the first period. The Canadiens tried to fight back, but were stymied by the defences of Seattle. Seattle scored three times in the second period to put the game out of reach. In the third, the onslaught continued, as the Mets led 7–0 before Laviolette scored to break the shut out.

Game-by-game		Winning team	Score	Losing team	Rules used	Location
1	March 17	Montreal Canadiens	8–4	Seattle Metropolitans	PCHA	Seattle Ice Arena
2	March 20	Seattle Metropolitans	6–1	Montreal Canadiens	NHA	Seattle Ice Arena
3	March 23	Seattle Metropolitans	4–1	Montreal Canadiens	PCHA	Seattle Ice Arena
4	March 26	Seattle Metropolitans	9–1	Montreal Canadiens	NHA	Seattle Ice Arena
Metropolitans win best-of-five series 3 games to 1

== Stanley Cup engraving ==
The 1917 Stanley Cup was presented by the trophy's trustee William Foran.

The following Metropolitans players and staff were members of the Stanley Cup winning team.

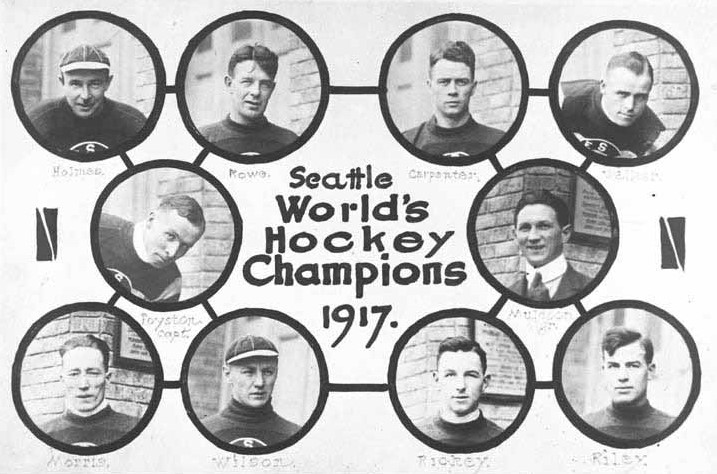
Seattle Metropolitans team in 1917.

1916–17 Seattle Metropolitans

=== Players ===
Centres

- Bernie Morris
- 7 Jack Walker‡

Wingers

- 4 Frank Foyston
- Jim Riley
- Carol Cully Wilson

Defencemen

- Bobby Rowe (Captain)
- Roy Rickey
- Everard Eddie Carpenter

Goaltenders

- 1 Harry Hap Holmes

=== Coaching and administrative staff ===
- Pete Muldoon (President-Owner/Manager-Coach)

‡ Played rover, a position between both defences and behind the centre.

=== Stanley Cup engraving ===
- "1917 Seattle World's Champions defeated Canadians" was engraved on the cup - a misspelling of Canadiens.
- Four of the Metropolitans had played together with the 1914 Stanley Cup champion Toronto Blueshirts: Jack Walker, Frank Foyston, Hap Holmes and Cully Wilson.
- Pete Muldoon was 29 years and nine months old and is still youngest coach or manager to win the Stanley Cup.

== Banner ==
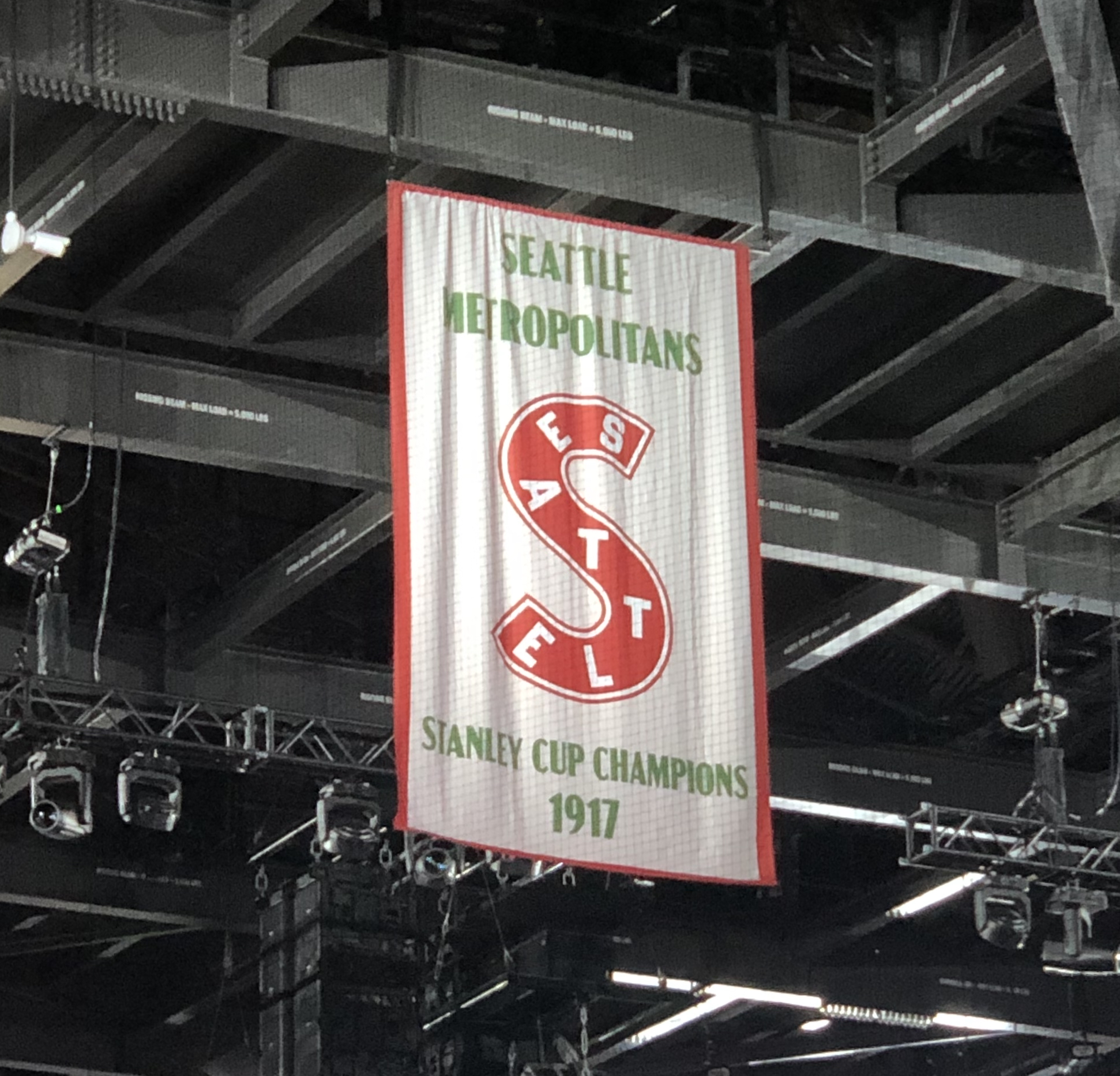
Metropolitans Stanley Cup Banner raised in Climate Pledge Arena

The Seattle Kraken revealed and hung a banner in honor of their forerunners' achievement on October 27, 2021, the night they hosted the Canadiens for the first time; if one does not include a 1961 exhibition game against the Seattle Totems, the Canadiens had not played a game of professional hockey in Seattle in 102 years – since the 1919 Stanley Cup Final that was never completed due to the Spanish flu pandemic.

== See also ==
- 1916–17 NHA season
- 1916–17 PCHA season

Preceded by Montreal Canadiens; 1916	Seattle Metropolitans; Stanley Cup champions 1917	Succeeded by Toronto; 1918
