= Muzz Murray =

American ice hockey player

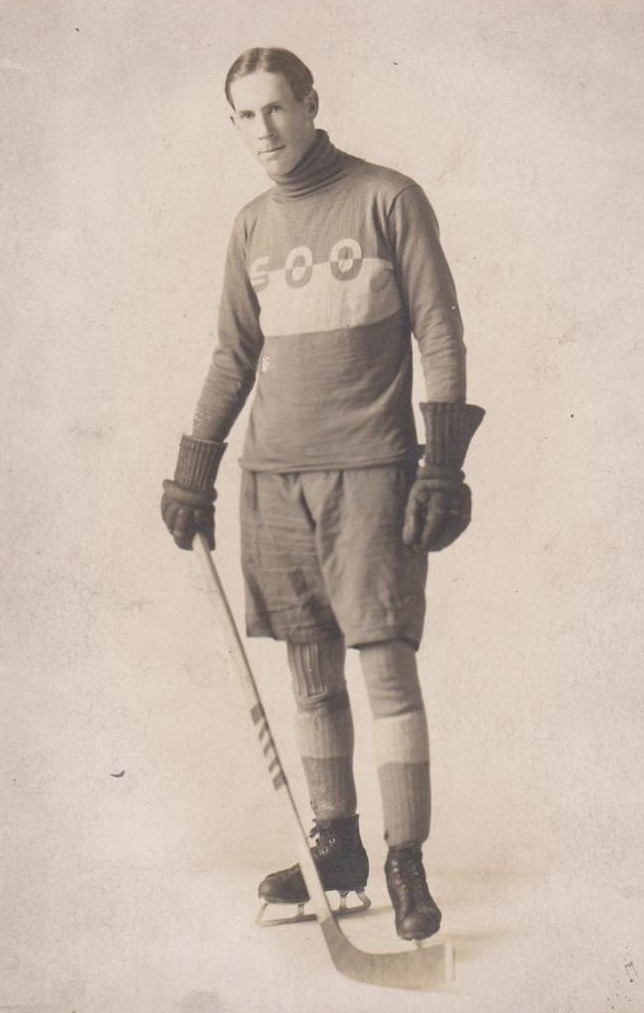
- Born: October 1, 1891 Sault Ste. Marie, MI, USA
- Died: February 13, 1961 (aged 69)
- Height: 6 ft 1 in (185 cm)
- Weight: 175 lb (79 kg; 12 st 7 lb)
- Position: Defense
- Shot: Left
- Played for: Seattle Metropolitans; Calgary Tigers
- Playing career: 1912–1937

Hugh Washington "Muzz" Murray (October 1, 1891 in Sault Ste. Marie, Michigan – February 13, 1961) was an American professional ice hockey defenseman. Murray played professionally in the Pacific Coast Hockey Association and Western Canada Hockey League for the Seattle Metropolitans and Calgary Tigers. He was inducted into the United States Hockey Hall of Fame in 1987.
