= Bobby Rowe (ice hockey) =

Canadian ice hockey player

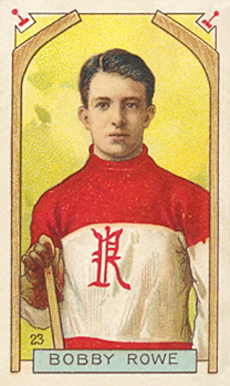
- Rowe with the Renfrew Creamery Kings on a 1911 Imperial Tobacco hockey card
- Born: August 19, 1885 Heathcote, Ontario, Canada
- Died: September 21, 1948 (aged 63) Portland, Oregon, United States
- Height: 5 ft 6 in (168 cm)
- Weight: 160 lb (73 kg; 11 st 6 lb)
- Position: Right wing/Defence
- Shot: Left
- Played for: Portage Lakes Hockey Club; Renfrew Millionaires; Victoria Aristocrats; Seattle Metropolitans; Boston Bruins
- Playing career: 1905–1926

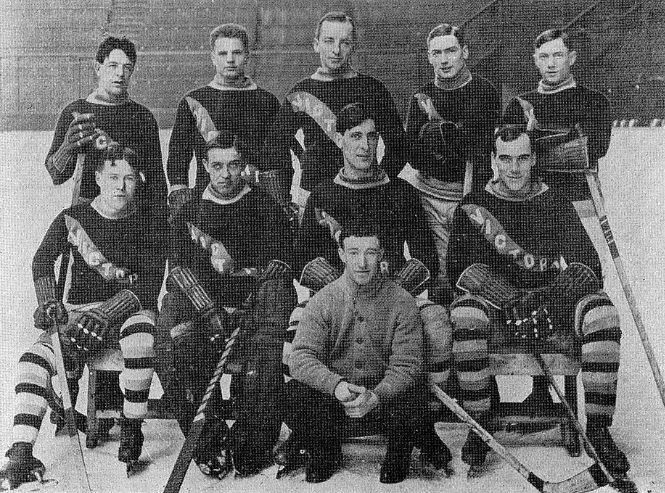
Rowe, in the upper left corner, with the Victoria Aristocrats.

Robert Price "Stubby" Rowe (August 19, 1885 – September 21, 1948) was a Canadian professional ice hockey player whose career spanned the early years of organized professional hockey in North America. Born in Heathcote, Ontario, Rowe played a total of 257 games in the Pacific Coast Hockey Association (PCHA), 25 games in the National Hockey Association (NHA), and four games in the newly formed National Hockey League (NHL), making him one of the few players to have competed in all three of the major leagues of his era.

Throughout his career, Rowe played for several notable teams, including the Renfrew Millionaires, Victoria Aristocrats, Seattle Metropolitans, and Boston Bruins. He began his career as a forward, primarily on the right wing. As the game evolved and his career progressed, Rowe transitioned to defence, a position in which he would spend the majority of his professional years.

One of the defining moments of Rowe’s career came in 1917 when he was a member of the Seattle Metropolitans. That year, the Metropolitans defeated the Montreal Canadiens to win the Stanley Cup, marking the first time in history that a team based in the United States captured hockey’s most prestigious trophy.

Following his retirement from professional hockey, Rowe remained active in the world of sports and entertainment. He became involved in promoting midget auto racing in the Northwest United States.

== Death ==
Rowe died on September 21, 1948, in Portland, Oregon, aged 63, leaving behind a legacy as both a pioneer of early professional hockey and a sports promoter.

== Career statistics ==
| | | | Regular season | | | | | Playoffs |
| Season | Team | League | GP | G | A | Pts | PIM | GP | G | A | Pts | PIM |
|---|---|---|---|---|---|---|---|---|---|---|---|---|
| 1902–03 | Portage Lakes | Exhib. | 12 | 25 | 0 | 25 | — | 4 | 2 | 0 | 2 | — |
| 1903–04 | Meaford Juniors | OHA-Jr. | — | — | — | — | — | — | — | — | — | — |
| 1904–05 | Meaford Juniors | OHA-Jr. | — | — | — | — | — | — | — | — | — | — |
| 1905–06 | Barrie Hockey Club | OHA-Sr. | 4 | 13 | 0 | 13 | 15 | — | — | — | — | — |
| 1906–07 | Barrie Pros | Exhib. | 1 | 4 | 0 | 4 | — | — | — | — | — | — |
| 1906–07 | Renfrew Riversides | UOVHL | — | — | — | — | — | — | — | — | — | — |
| 1906–07 | Latchford Pros | TPHL | 1 | 1 | 0 | 1 | 0 | — | — | — | — | — |
| 1907–08 | Renfrew Riversides | UOVHL | — | — | — | — | — | 2 | 9 | 0 | 9 | — |
| 1908–09 | Haileybury Comets | TPHL | 1 | 0 | 0 | 0 | 0 | — | — | — | — | — |
| 1908–09 | Renfrew Creamery Kings | FAHL | — | — | — | — | — | 2 | 9 | 0 | 9 | — |
| 1909–10 | Renfrew Creamery Kings | NHA | 9 | 11 | 0 | 11 | 38 | — | — | — | — | — |
| 1910–11 | Renfrew Creamery Kings | NHA | 16 | 11 | 0 | 11 | 82 | — | — | — | — | — |
| 1911–12 | Victoria Aristocrats | PCHA | 16 | 10 | 0 | 10 | 62 | — | — | — | — | — |
| 1912–13 | Victoria Aristocrats | PCHA | 15 | 8 | 7 | 15 | 34 | — | — | — | — | — |
| 1912–13 | Victoria Aristocrats | Exhib. | 2 | 2 | 0 | 2 | 9 | — | — | — | — | — |
| 1913–14 | Victoria Aristocrats | PCHA | 12 | 8 | 7 | 15 | 11 | — | — | — | — | — |
| 1913–14 | Victoria Aristocrats | St-Cup | — | — | — | — | — | 3 | 0 | 0 | 0 | 0 |
| 1914–15 | Victoria Aristocrats | PCHA | 12 | 6 | 1 | 7 | 13 | — | — | — | — | — |
| 1915–16 | Seattle Metropolitans | PCHA | 17 | 3 | 5 | 8 | 25 | — | — | — | — | — |
| 1916–17 | Seattle Metropolitans | PCHA | 25 | 9 | 12 | 21 | 45 | — | — | — | — | — |
| 1916–17 | Seattle Metropolitans | St-Cup | — | — | — | — | — | 4 | 0 | 2 | 2 | 0 |
| 1917–18 | Seattle Metropolitans | PCHA | 17 | 3 | 2 | 5 | 28 | 2 | 0 | 0 | 0 | 0 |
| 1918–19 | Seattle Metropolitans | PCHA | 20 | 5 | 6 | 11 | 19 | 2 | 0 | 1 | 1 | 0 |
| 1918–19 | Seattle Metropolitans | St-Cup | — | — | — | — | — | 5 | 1 | 0 | 1 | 6 |
| 1919–20 | Seattle Metropolitans | PCHA | 22 | 2 | 4 | 6 | 16 | 2 | 0 | 1 | 1 | 0 |
| 1919–20 | Seattle Metropolitans | St-Cup | — | — | — | — | — | 5 | 2 | 1 | 3 | 13 |
| 1920–21 | Seattle Metropolitans | PCHA | 24 | 0 | 2 | 2 | 29 | 2 | 0 | 1 | 1 | 0 |
| 1921–22 | Seattle Metropolitans | PCHA | 23 | 2 | 1 | 3 | 34 | 2 | 0 | 0 | 0 | 3 |
| 1922–23 | Seattle Metropolitans | PCHA | 30 | 7 | 2 | 9 | 71 | — | — | — | — | — |
| 1923–24 | Seattle Metropolitans | PCHA | 24 | 10 | 2 | 12 | 30 | 2 | 0 | 0 | 0 | 8 |
| 1924–25 | Boston Bruins | NHL | 4 | 1 | 0 | 1 | 0 | — | — | — | — | — |
| 1925–26 | Portland Rosebuds | WHL | 2 | 0 | 0 | 0 | 0 | — | — | — | — | — |
| PCHA totals | | | 257 | 73 | 51 | 124 | 417 | 12 | 0 | 3 | 3 | 11 |
| St-Cup totals | | | — | — | — | — | — | 17 | 3 | 3 | 6 | 19 |
