= 1915–16 PCHA season =

Can-Am pro ice hockey league season

- League: Pacific Coast Hockey Association
- Sport: Ice hockey
- Duration: December 7, 1915–February 25, 1916
- Teams: 4

Results
- Champion: Portland Rosebuds
- Top scorer: Cyclone Taylor (Vancouver)

PCHA seasons
- ← 1914–15 1916–17 →

The 1915–16 PCHA season was the fifth season of the professional men's ice hockey Pacific Coast Hockey Association league. Season play ran from December 7, 1915, until February 25, 1916. Each team would play 18 games. The Portland Rosebuds club would be PCHA champions. After the season, the club would play the Stanley Cup Final series against the Montreal Canadiens, NHA champions. Montreal would win the best-of-five series 3–2 to win the Cup.

== League business ==
The league granted a new franchise to Seattle, the Metropolitans. To stock the team, the team signed Harry Holmes, Frank Foyston, Jack Walker, Cully Wilson of the Toronto NHA team. This caused retaliatory raids and Bert Lindsay, Frank Nighbor, Skinner Poulin and Walter Smaill all were signed to NHA clubs.

== Teams ==
1915–16 Pacific Coast Hockey Association
Team	City	Arena	Capacity
Portland Rosebuds	Portland, Oregon	Portland Ice Arena	2,000
Seattle Metropolitans	Seattle, Washington	Seattle Ice Arena	4,000
Vancouver Millionaires	Vancouver, British Columbia	Denman Arena	10,500
Victoria Aristocrats	Victoria, British Columbia	Patrick Arena	4,000

=== Map of teams ===
PCHA Teams

== Regular season ==
=== Final standings ===
Note: W = Wins, L = Losses, T = Ties, GF= Goals For, GA = Goals against

Pacific Coast Hockey Association	GP	W	L	T	GF	GA
Portland Rosebuds	18	13	5	0	71	50
Vancouver Millionaires	18	9	9	0	75	69
Seattle Metropolitans	18	9	9	0	68	67
Victoria Aristocrats	18	5	13	0	74	102

== Playoffs ==
The Rosebuds won the championship and travelled east to meet the Montreal Canadiens for the Stanley Cup. The Canadiens won the series 3-2 to claim the Cup. As champions of the PCHA, the Rosebuds engraved their team name on the Cup.

=== Stanley Cup Final ===
Champions	Runners up	Format	Result
Montreal Canadiens	Portland Rosebuds	best of 5	3–2

== Results ==
Month	Day	Visitor	Score	Home	Score
Dec.	7	Portland	2	Vancouver	0
Dec.	7	Victoria	2	Seattle	3
Dec.	10	Vancouver	1	Portland	2
Dec.	10	Seattle	4	Victoria	3
Dec.	14	Victoria	7	Vancouver	5
Dec.	14	Portland	3	Seattle	4
Dec.	17	Vancouver	2	Victoria	8
Dec.	17	Seattle	2	Portland	5
Dec.	28	Vancouver	6	Seattle	4
Dec.	28	Victoria	2	Portland	3 (OT 11'30")
Jan.	4	Seattle	3	Vancouver	4
Jan.	4	Portland	10	Victoria	5
Jan.	7	Portland	6	Seattle	3
Jan.	11	Victoria	3	Vancouver	8
Jan.	14	Vancouver	5	Portland	3
Jan.	14	Seattle	3	Victoria	5
Jan.	18	Portland	1	Vancouver	4
Jan.	18	Victoria	3	Seattle	5
Jan.	21	Portland	3	Victoria	1
Jan.	25	Vancouver	3	Seattle	2
Jan.	25	Victoria	5	Portland	7
Jan.	29	Seattle	2	Vancouver	4
Feb.	1	Vancouver	16	Victoria	4
Feb.	1	Seattle	1	Portland	4
Feb.	4	Portland	6	Vancouver	1
Feb.	4	Victoria	3	Seattle	6
Feb.	8	Vancouver	0	Portland	1
Feb.	8	Victoria	4	Seattle	8
Feb.	11	Victoria	6	Vancouver	7 (OT 10'56")
Feb.	11	Portland	4	Seattle	8
Feb.	15†^{a}	Victoria	4	Portland	4
Feb.	16‡^{a}	Victoria	5	Portland	2
Feb.	18	Victoria	1	Portland	4
Feb.	18	Seattle	4	Vancouver	1
Feb.	22	Vancouver	2	Seattle	4
Feb.	25^{a}	Vancouver	6	Victoria	7
Feb.	25	Seattle	2	Portland	5

- † Cancelled due to fog.
- ‡ Replay of game on February 15.
- ^{a} at Seattle.

Source: Coleman 1966.

== Player statistics ==
=== Scoring leaders ===
Player	Team	GP	G	A	Pts	PIM
Cyclone Taylor	Vancouver Millionaires	18	22	13	35	9
Bernie Morris	Seattle Metropolitans	18	23	9	32	27
Charles Tobin	Portland Rosebuds	18	21	8	29	22
Dubbie Kerr	Victoria Aristocrats	18	16	12	28	46
Lester Patrick	Victoria Aristocrats	18	13	11	24	27
Sibby Nichols	Vancouver Millionaires; Victoria Aristocrats	12	12	10	22	3
Lloyd Cook	Vancouver Millionaires	18	18	3	21	24
Eddie Oatman	Portland Rosebuds	18	11	10	21	24
Jack Walker	Seattle Metropolitans	18	13	6	19	6
Mickey MacKay	Vancouver Millionaires	14	12	7	19	32

=== Goaltending averages ===
Name	Club	GP	GA	SO	Avg.
Tom Murray	Portland	18	50	2	2.8
Hap Holmes	Seattle	18	67		3.7
Hugh Lehman	Vancouver	18	69		3.8
Fred McCulloch	Victoria	18	10		5.7

== See also ==
- 1915 in sports
- 1916 in sports
- 1915–16 NHA season
- List of pre-NHL seasons
