= Cully Wilson =

Icelandic-Canadian ice hockey player

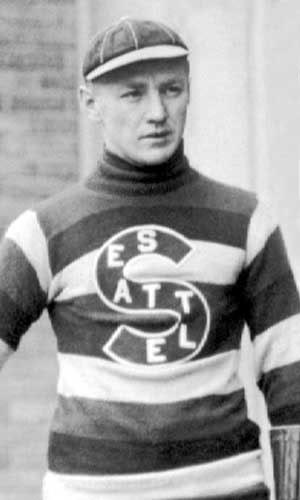
- Wilson with the Seattle Metropolitans
- Born: June 5, 1892 Winnipeg, Manitoba, Canada
- Died: July 7, 1962 (aged 70) Seattle, Washington, U.S.
- Height: 5 ft 8 in (173 cm)
- Weight: 180 lb (82 kg; 12 st 12 lb)
- Position: Right wing
- Shot: Right
- Played for: Chicago Black Hawks; Calgary Tigers; Hamilton Tigers; Montreal Canadiens; Toronto St. Pats; Seattle Metropolitans; Toronto Blueshirts
- Playing career: 1910–1932

Carol William "Cully" Wilson (June 5, 1892 – July 7, 1962) was an Icelandic-Canadian professional ice hockey player. The right winger played in the National Hockey League (NHL) for the Toronto St. Pats, Montreal Canadiens, Hamilton Tigers, and Chicago Black Hawks between 1919 and 1927. He was also a member of two teams that won the Stanley Cup before the NHL came into existence in 1917, the Toronto Blueshirts and Seattle Metropolitans.

Wilson came from a family of Icelandic descent and was born as Karl Wilhons Erlendson to parents Sigurður Erlendson and Medónía Indriðadóttir. The family later changed its name to Wilson.

== Career ==
Wilson played amateur hockey in his hometown of Winnipeg between 1910 and 1912, with the Winnipeg Falcons and the Winnipeg Monarchs. He began his professional career with the National Hockey Association's Toronto Blueshirts in 1912–13. The next year, in 1913–14, he won his first Stanley Cup when the Blueshirts beat the Montreal Canadiens in the NHA playoffs.

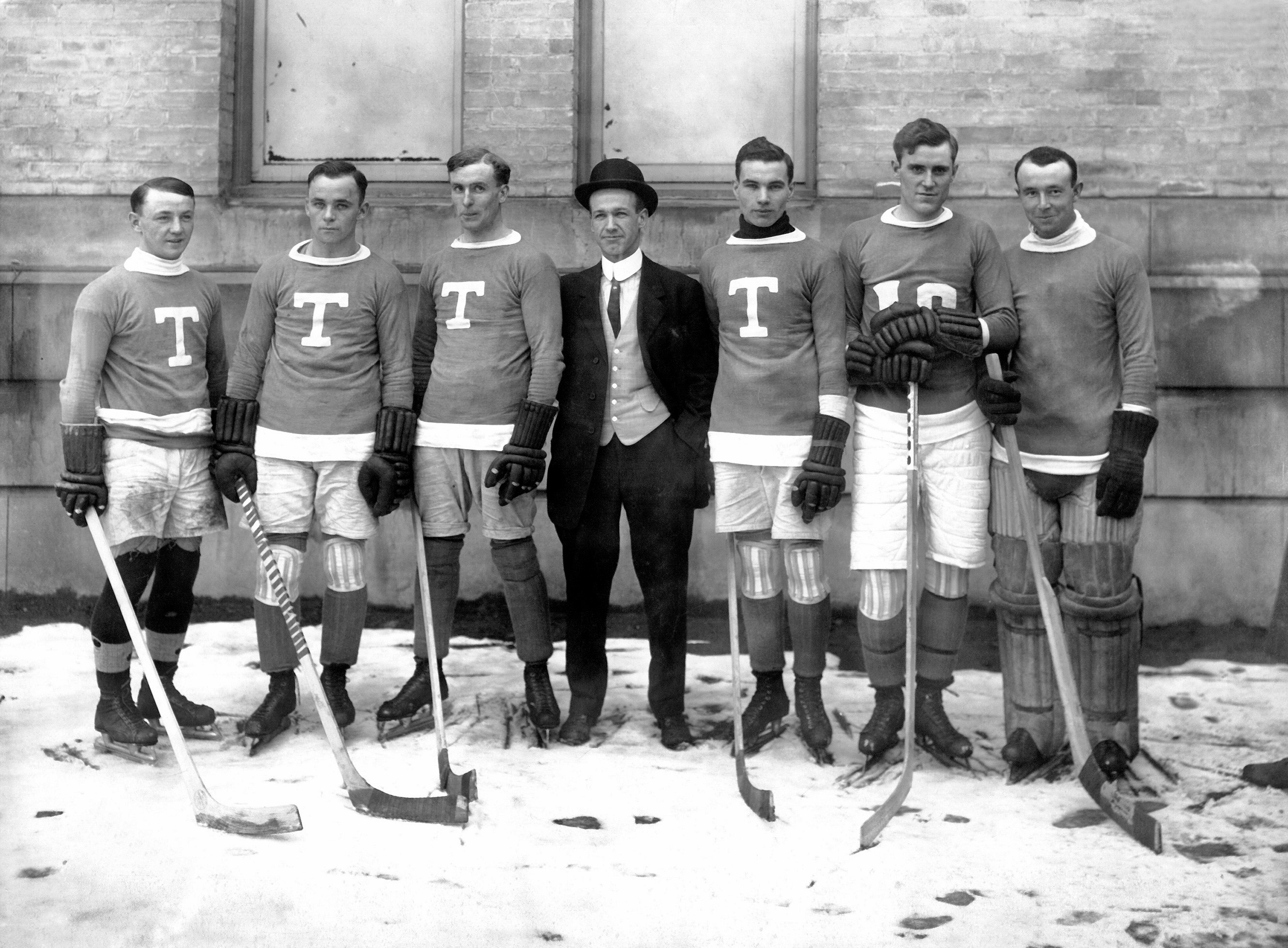
Wilson (far left) with the 1912–13 Toronto Blueshirts

He was a part of the "first" expansion of professional hockey when the Pacific Coast Hockey Association agreed to compete with the NHA in an east-west rivalry for the Stanley Cup championship. As a member of the Seattle Metropolitans, Wilson won the Stanley Cup for a second time in 1917, again beating the Montreal Canadiens.

Wilson signed with the National Hockey League's Toronto St. Pats in 1919, after having been expelled from the PCHA for a cheap shot on Mickey MacKay. In the NHL he also played briefly for the Montreal Canadiens, on a loan from the St. Patricks, and with the Hamilton Tigers. He left the NHL after the 1922–23 season and headed west to play for the Calgary Tigers of the Western Canada Hockey League.

Wilson returned to the NHL for one more season in 1926–27 after the WCHL folded and his rights were traded to the Chicago Black Hawks. After a disappointing year with the Black Hawks, Wilson moved on to the American Hockey Association's St. Paul Saints. Over the next three years he played and coached with the Saints before moving on to the San Francisco Tigers of the Cal-Pro League and the Duluth Hornets of the AHA. His last season was the 1931–32 season with the Kansas City Pla-Mors.

Wilson died in 1962 and is buried in Evergreen-Washelli Cemetery in Seattle.

== Playing style ==
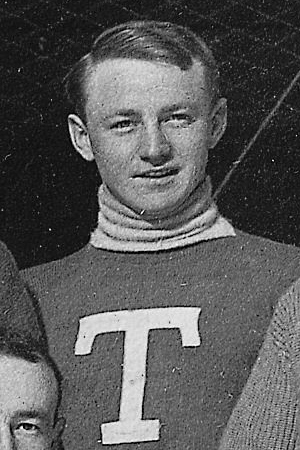
Wilson with Toronto Blueshirts in 1913–14.

Cully Wilson, a right winger position wise and a right-handed shot, was a fairly small-sized player even for his era, standing at 5 feet and 8 inches, but he compensated for his lack of size by playing an aggressive and rough style of hockey, both giving and receiving in the physical aspect of the game, quite similar to a modern day pest. As a result, he received a fair amount of slashes and cuts to his face throughout his hockey career.

One infamous instance of Wilson being involved in a violent tussle happened during the 1919 PCHA season, in a game against the Vancouver Millionaires, where Wilson fought for the puck against Millionaires centre forward Mickey MacKay and slashed him over the mouth. MacKay suffered a fractured jaw and missed the rest of the season. When the season was over PCHA chief disciplinarian Frank Patrick banned Wilson from the league. Wilson led three different leagues in penalty minutes in different seasons: 1914–15 in the NHA, 1919 in the PCHA, and 1919–20 in the NHL.

"It was in a skirmish for the puck and my face got in the way of his stick. It wasn't his fault at all. Quite unintentional. Of course, I cannot say that about all the slashes and rips that have gone to disfigure my countenance. Most of them are, because hockey players are good sports, and it is not very often that a fellow deliberately takes a crack at an opponent's face to wound him."

— Wilson describing a skirmish with Art Gagné in 1926.

Towards the end of the 1925–26 WHL season, Wilson had accumulated upwards to 80 stitches in his face alone over the course of his career, the latest courtesy of Edmonton Eskimos forward Art Gagné in a game between the Eskimos and Wilson's Calgary Tigers. Two new stitches were required to the side of his right eye, but Wilson proclaimed that the incident, like most similar incidents throughout his hockey career, had been quite unintentional on Gagné's part and only happened by mistake.

Wilson also had decent scoring upside to go along with his physical playing style, and in 1914–15 he led the reigning Stanley Cup champions Toronto Blueshirts in scoring with 22 goals and 27 points in 20 games, on top of his league leading 138 penalty minutes.

== Statistics ==
=== Regular season and playoffs ===
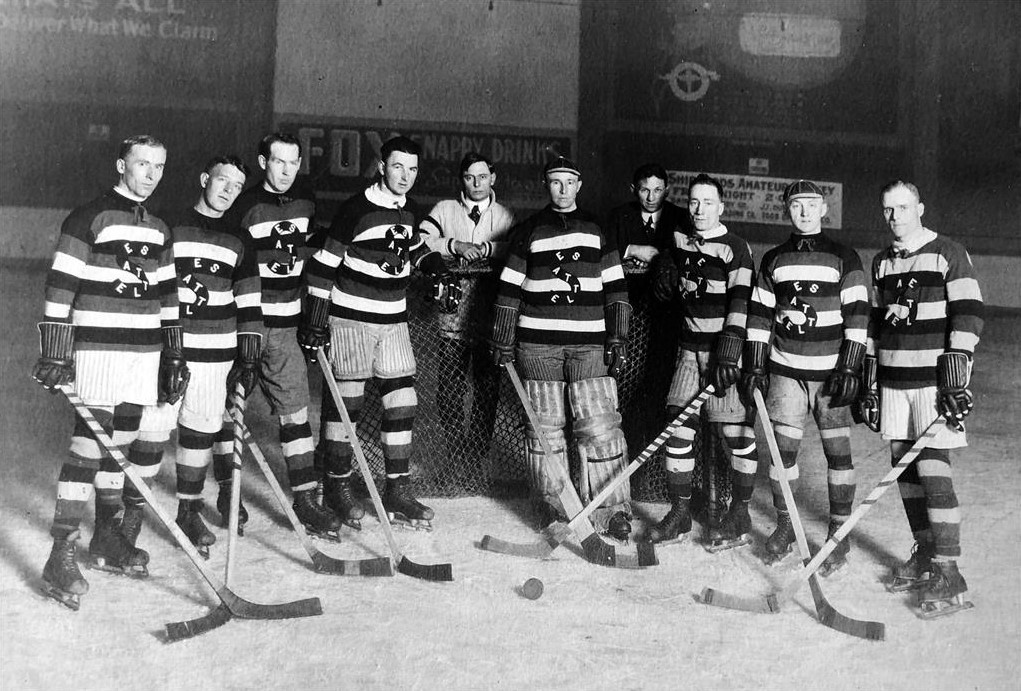
Wilson (second from right) with the 1919 Seattle Metropolitans

			Regular season					Playoffs
Season	Team	League	GP	G	A	Pts	PIM	GP	G	A	Pts	PIM
1910–11	Winnipeg Falcons	MIPHL	4	4	1	5	3	—	—	—	—	—
1910–11	Winnipeg Monarchs	MHL-Sr.	1	2	0	2	0	—	—	—	—	—
1911–12	Winnipeg Monarchs	MHL-Sr.	7	12	4	16	33	—	—	—	—	—
1912–13	Toronto Blueshirts	NHA	19	12	0	12	45	—	—	—	—	—
1913–14	Toronto Blueshirts	NHA	20	9	4	13	33	2	0	0	0	2
1913–14	Toronto Blueshirts	St-Cup	—	—	—	—	—	3	3	0	3	15
1914–15	Toronto Blueshirts	NHA	20	22	5	27	138	—	—	—	—	—
1915–16	Seattle Metropolitans	PCHA	18	12	5	17	57	—	—	—	—	—
1915–16	PCHA All-Stars	Exh.	1	8	0	8	0	—	—	—	—	—
1916–17	Seattle Metropolitans	PCHA	15	13	7	20	58	—	—	—	—	—
1916–17	Seattle Metropolitans	St-Cup	—	—	—	—	—	4	1	4	5	6
1917–18	Seattle Metropolitans	PCHA	17	8	6	14	46	2	0	0	0	3
1918–19	Seattle Metropolitans	PCHA	18	11	5	16	37	2	1	1	2	0
1918–19	Seattle Metropolitans	St-Cup	—	—	—	—	—	5	1	3	4	6
1919–20	Toronto St. Patricks	NHL	23	20	6	26	86	—	—	—	—	—
1920–21	Toronto St. Patricks	NHL	8	2	3	5	22	—	—	—	—	—
1920–21	Montreal Canadiens	NHL	11	6	1	7	29	—	—	—	—	—
1921–22	Hamilton Tigers	NHL	23	7	9	16	20	—	—	—	—	—
1922–23	Hamilton Tigers	NHL	23	16	5	21	46	—	—	—	—	—
1923–24	Calgary Tigers	WCHL	30	16	7	23	37	2	1	0	1	6
1923–24	Calgary Tigers	West-P	—	—	—	—	—	3	3	0	3	0
1923–24	Calgary Tigers	St-Cup	—	—	—	—	—	2	0	0	0	2
1924–25	Calgary Tigers	WCHL	28	14	6	20	20	2	1	0	1	6
1925–26	Calgary Tigers	WHL	30	11	4	15	63	—	—	—	—	—
1926–27	Chicago Black Hawks	NHL	39	8	4	12	40	2	1	0	1	6
1927–28	St. Paul Saints	AHA	38	10	2	12	64	—	—	—	—	—
1928–29	St. Paul Saints	AHA	40	10	5	15	40	8	2	2	4	14
1929–30	St. Paul Saints	AHA	48	7	6	13	57	—	—	—	—	—
1930–31	San Francisco Tigers	Cal-Pro	—	10	2	12	—	—	—	—	—	—
1930–31	Duluth Hornets	AHA	24	10	6	16	24	4	0	0	0	2
1931–32	Kansas City Pla-Mors	AHA	34	1	2	3	28	4	0	0	0	2
NHA totals			59	43	9	52	216	2	0	0	0	2
PCHA totals			68	44	23	67	198	4	1	1	2	3
WCHL totals			88	41	17	58	120	4	2	0	2	12
NHL totals			127	59	28	87	243	2	1	0	1	6

== Awards and achievements ==
- Stanley Cup championships (1914, 1917)
- PCHA First All-Star Team (1919)
- WCHL Second All-Star Team (1925)
- In 2015, Wilson was inducted into the Manitoba Hockey Hall of Fame.
