= Hap Holmes =

Canadian ice hockey player (1888–1941)

- Hockey Hall of Fame, 1972
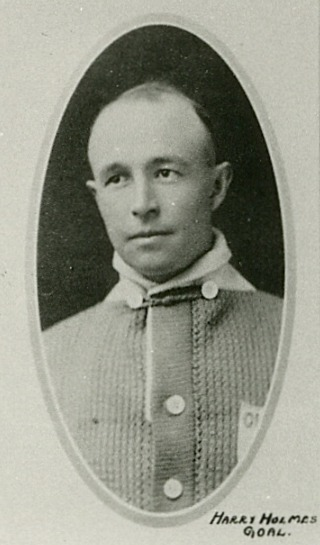
- Holmes with the Toronto Arenas in 1917
- Born: February 21, 1888 Aurora, Ontario, Canada
- Died: June 27, 1941 (aged 53) Fort Lauderdale, Florida, U.S.
- Height: 5 ft 10 in (178 cm)
- Weight: 170 lb (77 kg; 12 st 2 lb)
- Position: Goaltender
- Caught: Left
- Played for: Toronto Blueshirts; Seattle Metropolitans; Toronto Arenas; Victoria Cougars; Detroit Cougars
- Playing career: 1912–1928

Harry George "Hap" Holmes (February 21, 1888 – June 27, 1941) was a Canadian professional ice hockey player. A goaltender, Holmes won the Stanley Cup four times, with four teams. He tied the record of his 1914 Stanley Cup winning Toronto Blueshirts teammate Jack Marshall, who also won Cups with four teams. No other player has duplicated this record.

Holmes played as an amateur for three seasons with the Parkdale Canoe Club of the Ontario Hockey Association (OHA) from 1908 to 1911, before joining the professional Toronto Blueshirts of the National Hockey Association (NHA) in 1912–13. Holmes won the first of his four Stanley Cups in 1914. Although being under contract to the Blueshirts, Holmes joined the Seattle Metropolitans of the Pacific Coast Hockey Association (PCHA) for the 1915–16 season, winning his second Stanley Cup (1917) in his second season with the Metropolitans. For the 1917–18 season, Holmes ended up playing for the Torontos (the following year renamed as the Toronto Arenas) of the National Hockey League (NHL) through a series of loans by other teams. Holmes won his third Stanley Cup in his only full season with the Torontos. After playing two games in the 1918–19 season for the Toronto Arenas, Holmes was recalled by the Metropolitans. Holmes played for the Metropolitans for the next six seasons, until the team folded.

In the 1924–25 season, Holmes joined the Victoria Cougars of the Western Canada Hockey League (WCHL/WHL). Holmes played for the Cougars for two seasons, winning the Stanley Cup for his fourth and last time. After the WCHL/WHL folded, Holmes joined the Detroit Cougars of the NHL, playing with the Cougars for two seasons before retiring.

Holmes was a stand-up style goaltender; later on in his career, Holmes wore a cap in goal to protect his head from objects thrown by spectators. Holmes coached minor-league teams after his retirement, notably the Toronto Millionaires of the Canadian Professional Hockey League (CPHL) and the Cleveland Indians of the International Hockey League (IHL). Holmes died in 1941, near Fort Lauderdale, Florida, and was inducted posthumously into the Hockey Hall of Fame in 1972.

== Amateur career ==
Harry "Hap" Holmes, alternatively nicknamed "Happy", started playing ice hockey as an amateur with the Toronto Parkdale Canoe Club in the Ontario Hockey Association (OHA) in the 1908–09 season. He played with Parkdale for three seasons, for 11 regular season games and two playoff games. In his first season with the Parkdale Canoe Club, Holmes lost all three games in which he appeared, giving up 22 goals over that stretch.

The following season, Holmes appeared in four games, winning and losing two games apiece. Over the 1909–10 season, Holmes gave up 26 goals. In 1910–11, his last season with the Parkdale Canoe Club, he appeared in four regular season games once more, winning three and losing one, while giving up only 12 goals over those games. In the playoffs, Holmes played two games, losing one and tying the other, surrendering nine goals.

In the 1911–12 season, Holmes appeared in only one exhibition game, as the Toronto Blueshirts were unable to play due to the slow completion of their artificial ice. Holmes played a game for the Toronto Tecumsehs, conceding three goals in a victory.

== Professional career ==
=== Toronto Blueshirts ===
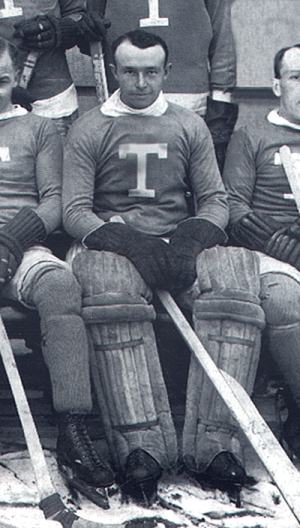
Holmes with the Toronto Blueshirts in 1912

Holmes began his professional career playing for the Toronto Blueshirts of the National Hockey Association (NHA) in 1912–13. Holmes played with the Blueshirts for three seasons. In his first season with the Blueshirts, Holmes had a 6–7 (win-loss) record over 15 games with a shutout, and a 4.47 goals-against average. The Blueshirts ended up missing the playoffs. In the 1913–14 season, Holmes' second season with the Blueshirts, he won the Stanley Cup for the first time. It was the first time a Toronto-based team won the Stanley Cup. In the NHA playoffs, Holmes won one out of two games, and recorded a 1.00 goals-against average and one shutout; in the Stanley Cup Final, Holmes won all three games and finished with a 2.59 goals-against average. The next season, the Blueshirts missed the playoffs, as Holmes had only eight victories over 20 games, ending up with a 4.18 goals-against average.

=== First stint with the Seattle Metropolitans ===
In the 1915–16 season, Holmes signed with the Seattle Metropolitans of the Pacific Coast Hockey Association (PCHA), although he was still under contract to the Blueshirts. In his first season with the Metropolitans, Holmes played 18 games. He finished with a 9–9 record, with no shutouts and a 3.67 goals-against average. That season, the Metropolitans missed the playoffs. In his second season with Seattle, Holmes posted a 16–8 record over 24 games, with two shutouts and a 3.28 goals-against average. In the Stanley Cup Final, Holmes posted a 3–1 record with a 2.75 goals-against average, en route to the Metropolitans' only Stanley Cup win. The Metropolitans became the first American-based team to win the Stanley Cup.

=== Torontos / Toronto Arenas ===
In November 1917, Holmes signed as a free agent with the Montreal Wanderers. The Wanderers, in turn, loaned Holmes back to Seattle on December 12, 1917. On January 4, 1918, the Metropolitans returned Holmes under loan to the Torontos, now in the newly formed NHL. In his only full season with the Torontos/Arenas, Holmes appeared in 16 regular season games, posting a 9–7 record, with a 4.73 goals-against average and no shutouts. In the NHL playoffs, Holmes played two games, winning and losing one apiece. In the Stanley Cup Final, Holmes had a 3–2 record over five games, with a 4.00 goals-against average, en route to Holmes' third Stanley Cup win. He is the only member of both the Blueshirts' 1914 Stanley Cup win and the Torontos' 1918 Stanley Cup win. After playing only two games with the Toronto Arenas the following season, surrendering nine goals in two losses, Holmes was recalled by the Metropolitans on December 27, 1918.

=== Second stint with the Seattle Metropolitans ===
In the 1918–19 season Holmes appeared in 20 regular season games for the Metropolitans, winning 11 and losing nine, with no shutouts and a 2.25 goals-against average. In the PCHA playoffs, Holmes played two games, winning and losing one apiece, and surrendering five goals in total. The Metropolitans made the Stanley Cup Final once more. Playing against the Montreal Canadiens of the National Hockey League (NHL), the series was abandoned tied at two wins apiece, because of the Spanish flu pandemic. Montreal could not continue the series because several of their players were severely ill with influenza; however, the Metropolitans did not wish to accept the Cup by default. Canadiens player Joe Hall died on April 5, 1919, five days after the end of the series, in a Seattle hospital. The only draw of the series was a scoreless affair; after playing 20 minutes of overtime, referee Mickey Ion called the game off.

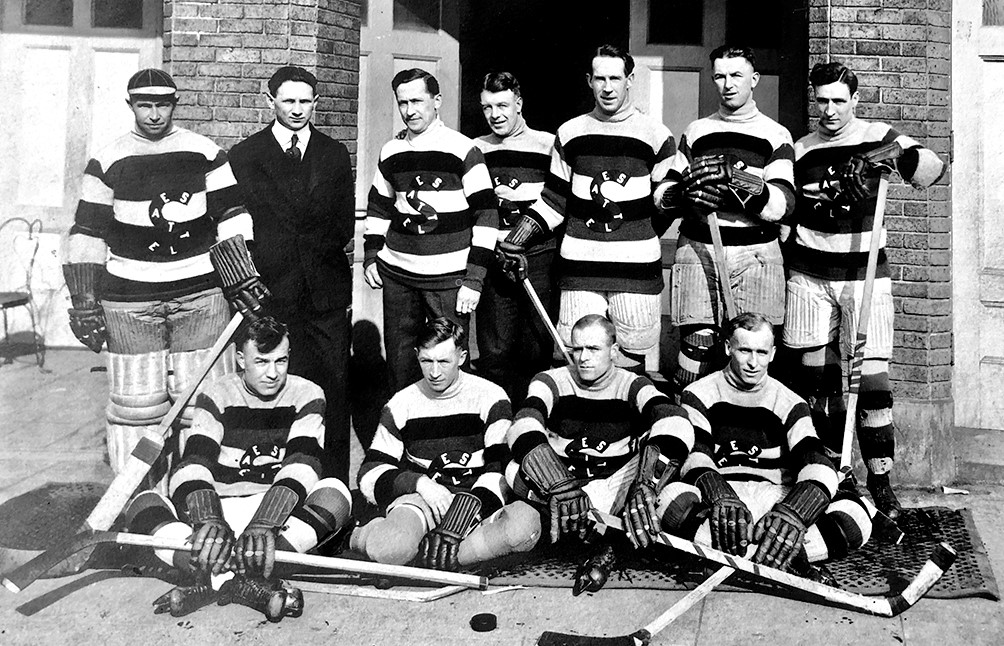
Holmes (back row, far left) with the 1920 Seattle Metropolitans

In the 1919–20 season, Holmes appeared in 22 games, winning 12 games, and losing 10. He finished the season with four shutouts and a 2.46 goals-against average. In the PCHA playoffs, Holmes played two games, surrendering three goals, and ending up with a loss and a win. The Metropolitans made the Stanley Cup Final for the second straight season, playing against the Ottawa Senators of the NHL. The Metropolitans lost, and Holmes posted a 2–3 record with a 3.00 goals-against average.

Holmes played the next four seasons with the Metropolitans, but failed to make the Stanley Cup Final. Over that stretch, Holmes and the Metropolitans won about half the games each season. The Metropolitans missed the playoffs in only the 1922–23 season. In the 1920–21 season, Holmes appeared in 24 games. He posted a 12–11–1 (win-loss-tie) record, with a 2.63 goals-against average and no shutouts. In the playoffs, he lost both games he appeared in, and let in 13 goals. The following season, he posted an identical win–loss–tie record in both the regular season and playoffs. The only difference was a 2.60 goals-against average in the regular season, with four shutouts, and the reduction of his playoffs goals-against by 11 goals. In the 1922–23 season, Holmes appeared in 30 games, posting a 15–15 record, with two shutouts and a 3.45 goals-against average; however, the Metropolitans missed the playoffs that season. In the 1923–24 season, Holmes' last with the Metropolitans, he appeared in 30 regular season games, posting a 14–16 record, with two shutouts and a 3.26 goals-against average. Despite an extra loss, the Metropolitans made the playoffs that season. Holmes played two games, losing one and tying one, ending up with a 1.79 goals-against average.

=== Victoria Cougars ===
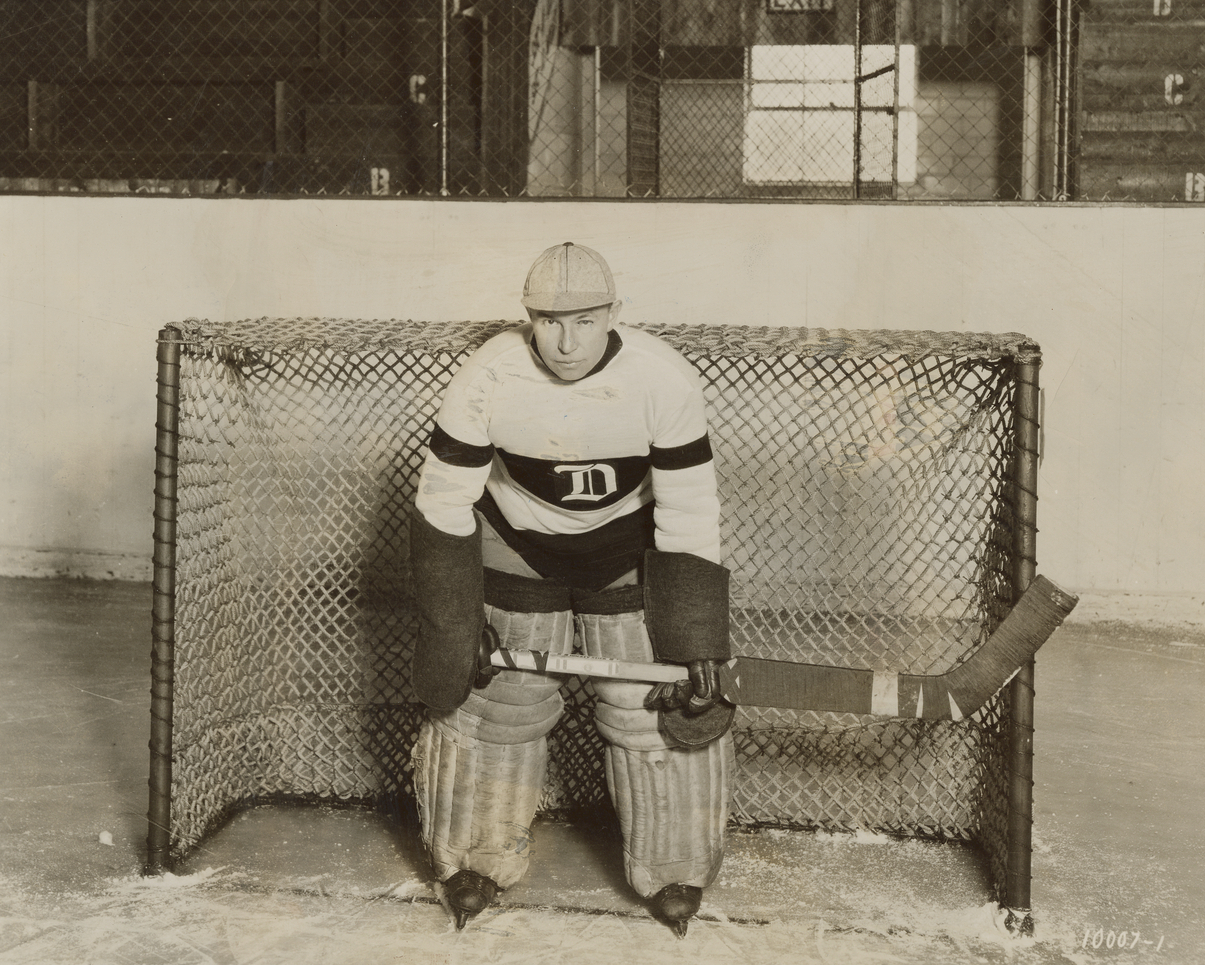
Harry George "Hap" Holmes

In 1924–25, after the Metropolitans folded and the rest of the PCHA merged with the Western Canada Hockey League (WCHL), Holmes joined the Victoria Cougars. In his first season with the Cougars, Holmes posted a 16–12 regular season record, with three shutouts and a 2.25 goals-against average. In the WCHL playoffs, Holmes was undefeated in four games. He had two wins and ties each, with one shutout and a 1.75 goals-against average. In the Stanley Cup Final, Holmes posted a 3–1 record with a 2.00 goals-against average against the Montreal Canadiens. It was the last time a non-NHL team won the Stanley Cup. It was Holmes' fourth and last Stanley Cup victory.

The following season, Holmes had a 15–11–4 regular season record, with four shutouts and a 1.68 goals-against average. In the WHL playoffs, Holmes nearly duplicated his results from the previous season, posting a 2–0–2 record, with one shutout and a 1.45 goals-against average. In the 1926 Stanley Cup Final, the Cougars lost the series 3–1 against the Montreal Maroons. That marked the last time a non-NHL team appeared in the Stanley Cup Final, as the WHL folded after the 1926 Stanley Cup Final, and its players were absorbed by the NHL. It was Holmes' seventh and last Stanley Cup Final appearance.

=== Detroit Cougars ===
A new NHL franchise in Detroit bought the rights to the Victoria Cougars players, and named the team the Cougars. Holmes played his last two professional seasons with the Detroit Cougars. Holmes, playing for Detroit, posted 17 shutouts in 85 appearances. Detroit failed to make the playoffs in both of Holmes' seasons with them, as Holmes only won 30 of his 85 appearances. In Holmes' first season with Detroit, he posted an 11–26–4 record, over 41 games played. Holmes had six shutouts and overall, his goals-against average that season was 2.23. In the 1927–28 season, Holmes' final one as a professional player, he appeared in all 44 of Detroit's games. He posted a 19–19–6 record, with 11 shutouts and a 1.73 goals-against average.

== Playing style ==
As a player, Holmes wore a baseball cap in net to protect his head from spectators spitting tobacco or throwing other objects at it. Holmes was bald, and as described by the Windsor Star, "his shining bald dome presented a tempting target". Holmes played a stand-up style, and relied on proper positioning to stop the puck. Holmes' play was consistent, and he was relaxed and nonchalant in the nets, leading some to describe his play as almost lazy.

== Post-retirement ==
After his playing career, Holmes coached minor-league teams. He coached the Toronto Millionaires of the Canadian Professional Hockey League (CPHL) to a 19–6–7 record in the 1928–29 season, and the Cleveland Indians of the International Hockey League (IHL) to a 24–18–6 record in the 1930–31 season. The American Hockey League (AHL) named their award for the top goaltender, the Hap Holmes Memorial Award, after him.

In his later years, Holmes moved to south Florida and opened a papaya farm. During this period, his son Bill played with the Miami Clippers of the abortive Tropical Hockey League. The elder Holmes had the intention of eventually starting a hockey league in Australia, but the farm went under and nothing came of the idea.

Holmes died on June 27, 1941, of a cerebral hemorrhage, after years of declining health. He was inducted posthumously into the Hockey Hall of Fame in 1972.

== Career statistics ==
=== Regular season and playoffs ===
			Regular season								Playoffs
Season	Team	League	GP	W	L	T	MIN	GA	SO	GAA	GP	W	L	T	MIN	GA	SO	GAA
1908–09	Toronto Parkdale Canoe Club	OHA-Sr.	3	0	3	0	180	22	0	7.33	—	—	—	—	—	—	—	—
1909–10	Parkdale Canoe Club	OHA-Sr.	4	2	2	0	240	26	0	6.50	—	—	—	—	—	—	—	—
1910–11	Parkdale Canoe Club	OHA-Sr.	4	3	1	0	240	12	0	3.00	2	0	1	1	120	9	0	4.50
1911–12	Toronto Tecumsehs	Exhib.	1	1	0	0	60	3	0	3.00	—	—	—	—	—	—	—	—
1912–13	Toronto Blueshirts	NHA	15	6	7	0	779	58	1	4.47	—	—	—	—	—	—	—	—
1913–14	Toronto Blueshirts	NHA	20	13	7	0	1204	65	1	3.24	2	1	1	0	120	2	1	1.00
1913–14	Toronto Blueshirts	St-Cup	—	—	—	—	—	—	—	—	3	3	0	0	195	8	0	2.46
1914–15	Toronto Blueshirts	NHA	20	8	12	0	1218	84	0	4.18	—	—	—	—	—	—	—	—
1915–16	Seattle Metropolitans	PCHA	18	9	9	0	1080	66	0	3.67	—	—	—	—	—	—	—	—
1916–17	Seattle Metropolitans	PCHA	24	16	8	0	1465	80	2	3.28	—	—	—	—	—	—	—	—
1916–17	Seattle Metropolitans	St-Cup	—	—	—	—	—	—	—	—	4	3	1	0	240	11	0	2.75
1917–18	Toronto Arenas	NHL	16	9	7	0	965	76	0	4.73	2	1	1	0	120	7	0	3.50
1917–18	Toronto Arenas	St-Cup	—	—	—	—	—	—	—	—	5	3	2	0	300	21	0	4.20
1918–19	Toronto Arenas	NHL	2	0	2	0	120	9	0	4.50	—	—	—	—	—	—	—	—
1918–19	Seattle Metropolitans	PCHA	20	11	9	0	1225	46	0	2.25	2	1	1	0	120	5	0	2.50
1918–19	Seattle Metropolitans	St-Cup	—	—	—	—	—	—	—	—	5	2	2	1	336	10	2	1.79
1919–20	Seattle Metropolitans	PCHA	22	12	10	0	1340	55	4	2.46	2	1	1	0	120	3	1	1.50
1919–20	Seattle Metropolitans	St-Cup	—	—	—	—	—	—	—	—	5	2	3	0	300	15	0	3.00
1920–21	Seattle Metropolitans	PCHA	24	12	11	1	1551	68	0	2.63	2	0	2	0	120	13	0	6.50
1921–22	Seattle Metropolitans	PCHA	24	12	11	1	1479	64	4	2.60	2	0	2	0	120	2	0	1.00
1922–23	Seattle Metropolitans	PCHA	30	15	15	0	1844	106	2	3.45	—	—	—	—	—	—	—	—
1923–24	Seattle Metropolitans	PCHA	30	14	16	0	1824	99	2	3.26	2	0	1	1	134	4	0	1.79
1924–25	Victoria Cougars	WCHL	28	16	12	0	1683	63	3	2.25	4	2	0	2	240	5	1	1.25
1924–25	Victoria Cougars	St-Cup	—	—	—	—	—	—	—	—	4	3	1	0	240	8	0	2.00
1925–26	Victoria Cougars	WHL	30	15	11	4	1894	53	4	1.68	4	2	0	2	249	6	1	1.45
1925–26	Victoria Cougars	St-Cup	—	—	—	—	—	—	—	—	4	1	3	0	240	10	0	2.50
1926–27	Detroit Cougars	NHL	41	11	26	4	2685	100	6	2.23	—	—	—	—	—	—	—	—
1927–28	Detroit Cougars	NHL	44	19	19	6	2740	79	11	1.73	—	—	—	—	—	—	—	—
NHA totals			55	27	26	0	3201	207	2	3.88	2	1	1	0	120	2	1	1.00
PCHA totals			192	101	89	2	11,808	584	14	2.97	10	2	7	1	614	27	1	2.64
St-Cup totals			—	—	—	—	—	—	—	—	30	17	12	1	1851	83	2	2.69
NHL totals			103	39	54	10	6510	264	17	2.43	2	1	1	0	120	7	0	3.50
