= Roy Rickey =

Canadian ice hockey player

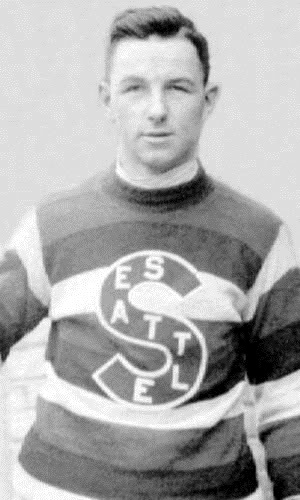
- Roy Rickey with the Seattle Metropolitans in the 1916–17 season
- Born: November 15, 1893 Ottawa, Ontario, Canada
- Died: September 6, 1959 (aged 65)
- Position: Defence
- Played for: Saskatoon Wholesalers (SPHL); Seattle Metropolitans (PCHA); Edmonton Eskimos (WCHL)
- Playing career: 1915–1928

Roy Allison Rickey (November 15, 1893 – September 6, 1959) was a Canadian professional ice hockey player who played in the Pacific Coast Hockey Association and Western Canada Hockey League. He played for the Seattle Metropolitans and Edmonton Eskimos. He won a Stanley Cup with the Metropolitans in 1917.

== Playing career ==
Born in Ottawa, Ontario, Rickey began his professional career in the 1911–12 season with the Saskatoon Wholesalers of the Saskatchewan Professional League.

Rickey joined the Seattle Metropolitans in 1915, played eight seasons for the Metropolitans, and was a member of the 1917 Stanley Cup champions. He also played in the 1919 Stanley Cup Final with the Metropolitans, but the series against the Montreal Canadiens was cancelled at 2-2 because of the Spanish flu. Rickey himself was at the Providence Hospital in Seattle with a high fever.

In 1924, Rickey joined the Edmonton Eskimos. In 1925, his contract was sold by the Eskimos to the New York Americans, but he did not join the team. After the Western Canada Hockey League folded in 1926, Rickey played in the Can-Pro League, playing two further seasons for Hamilton and Niagara Falls before retiring from professional play.
