= Harry Meeking =

Canadian ice hockey player (1894–1971)

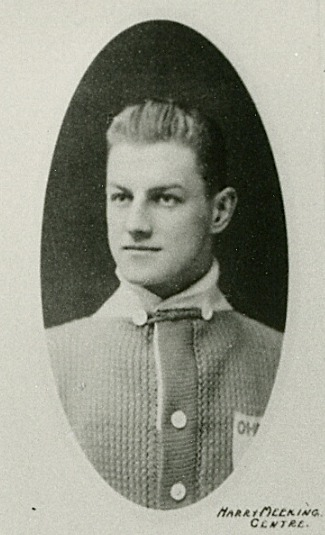
- Meeking with the Toronto Arenas
- Born: November 4, 1894 Berlin, Ontario, Canada
- Died: December 13, 1971 (aged 77)
- Height: 5 ft 7 in (170 cm)
- Weight: 160 lb (73 kg; 11 st 6 lb)
- Position: Left wing
- Shot: Right
- Played for: Toronto Arenas; Detroit Cougars; Boston Bruins
- Playing career: 1917–1927

Henry Arthur "Hurricane Howie" Meeking (November 4, 1894 – December 13, 1971) was a Canadian professional ice hockey player who played three seasons in the National Hockey League for the Toronto Arenas, Detroit Cougars and Boston Bruins. He was born in Berlin, Ontario.

His brother Gordon Meeking was also a hockey player.

== Playing career ==
Meeking won a Stanley Cup in the inaugural season of the NHL with the Arenas. After playing his first 2 years in the newly formed National League, Meeking would spend the next 7 years playing in the PCHL, WCHL and CPHL before returning to the NHL for one more season in 1926–27. He started that season with the Detroit Cougars but would finish his NHL career in Boston after being traded with Frank Fredrickson. Meeking also won the Stanley Cup as a member of the PCHL's Victoria Cougars in 1925 who were the last team outside of the NHL to challenge for and win the coveted title.

== Perfect hand ==
It was reported in 1963 that Meeking, then aged 69, had recently held a perfect 29 hand in a game of cribbage, which he had played for 50 years.

== Career statistics ==
=== Regular season and playoffs ===
			Regular season					Playoffs
Season	Team	League	GP	G	A	Pts	PIM	GP	G	A	Pts	PIM
1912–13	Toronto Canoe Club	OHA Jr	—	—	—	—	—	—	—	—	—	—
1912–13	Toronto R & AA	OHA Sr	—	—	—	—	—	1	0	0	0	0
1913–14	Toronto R & AA	OHA Sr	4	5	0	5	—	2	2	0	2	4
1914–15	Toronto Victorias	OHA Sr	6	16	0	16	—	4	2	0	2	—
1915–16	Toronto Blueshirts	NHA	14	3	1	4	8	2	0	0	0	0
1916–17	Ottawa Signallers	OCHL	8	7	0	7	32	—	—	—	—	—
1917–18	Toronto Arenas	NHL	21	10	9	19	28	2	3	0	3	6
1917–18	Toronto Arenas	St-Cup	—	—	—	—	—	5	1	2	3	18
1918–19	Toronto Arenas	NHL	14	7	3	10	32	—	—	—	—	—
1918–19	Glace Bay Miners	CBHL	—	—	—	—	—	—	—	—	—	—
1919–20	Victoria Aristocrats	PCHA	21	4	4	8	51	—	—	—	—	—
1920–21	Victoria Aristocrats	PCHA	24	13	2	15	15	—	—	—	—	—
1921–22	Victoria Aristocrats	PCHA	24	2	4	6	33	—	—	—	—	—
1922–23	Victoria Cougars	PCHA	28	17	9	26	43	2	0	0	0	2
1923–24	Victoria Cougars	PCHA	29	8	5	13	34	—	—	—	—	—
1924–25	Victoria Cougars	WCHL	28	12	2	14	24	4	0	0	0	2
1924–25	Victoria Cougars	St-Cup	—	—	—	—	—	4	0	1	1	2
1925–26	Victoria Cougars	WHL	19	1	1	2	20	4	0	0	0	0
1925–26	Victoria Cougars	St-Cup	—	—	—	—	—	4	0	0	0	6
1926–27	Detroit Cougars	NHL	6	0	0	0	4	—	—	—	—	—
1926–27	Windsor Hornets	Can-Pro	11	5	2	7	14	—	—	—	—	—
1926–27	Boston Bruins	NHL	23	1	0	1	2	7	0	0	0	0
1927–28	New Haven Eagles	Can-Am	39	9	6	15	61	—	—	—	—	—
1928–29	Philadelphia Arrows	Can-Am	38	5	1	6	60	—	—	—	—	—
1929–30	Toronto Millionaires	IHL	19	2	3	5	30	—	—	—	—	—
1929–30	London Panthers	IHL	6	1	1	2	6	—	—	—	—	—
1929–30	Kitchener Flying Dutchmen	Can-Pro	2	1	0	1	0	—	—	—	—	—
NHA totals			14	3	1	4	8	2	0	0	0	0
PCHA/WHL totals			173	57	27	84	220	10	0	0	0	4
NHL totals			64	18	12	30	66	9	3	0	3	6
