= Gord Fraser (ice hockey) =

Canadian ice hockey player

- Born: March 3, 1894 Pembroke, ON, CAN
- Died: October 1, 1964 (aged 70) London, ON, CAN
- Height: 6 ft 0 in (183 cm)
- Weight: 180 lb (82 kg; 12 st 12 lb)
- Position: Defence
- Shot: Left
- Played for: Chicago Black Hawks; Detroit Cougars; Montreal Canadiens; Pittsburgh Pirates; Philadelphia Quakers; Victoria Cougars; Seattle Metropolitans
- Playing career: 1921–1936

Gordon Wellington "Gord" Fraser (March 3, 1894 – October 1, 1964) was a Canadian professional ice hockey defenceman who played five seasons in the National Hockey League for the Chicago Black Hawks, Detroit Cougars, Montreal Canadiens, Pittsburgh Pirates and Philadelphia Quakers. He won the Stanley Cup in 1925 with the Victoria Cougars, the last non-NHL team to win the Cup.

Fraser died in London, Ontario in 1964 after a long illness at the age of 70. He was buried at Woodland Cemetery of that same city.

== Career statistics ==
=== Regular season and playoffs ===
			Regular season					Playoffs
Season	Team	League	GP	G	A	Pts	PIM	GP	G	A	Pts	PIM
1916–17	Pembroke Munitions	OVHL	5	2	0	2	—	—	—	—	—	—
1917–18	Pembroke Munitions	OVHL	3	1	0	1	—	—	—	—	—	—
1918–19	Port Arthur Ports	TBJHL	6	4	0	4	—	—	—	—	—	—
1919–20	Calgary Wanderers	Big-4	10	2	1	3	20	2	1	0	1	0
1920–21	Calgary Tigers	Big-4	15	11	6	17	33	—	—	—	—	—
1921–22	Seattle Metropolitans	PCHA	24	5	2	7	32	2	0	0	0	0
1922–23	Seattle Metropolitans	PCHA	29	4	4	8	46	—	—	—	—	—
1923–24	Seattle Metropolitans	PCHA	30	14	3	17	64	2	0	0	0	4
1924–25	Victoria Cougars	WCHL	28	9	3	12	64	4	0	0	0	12
1924–25	Victoria Cougars	St-Cup	—	—	—	—	—	4	2	1	3	6
1925–26	Victoria Cougars	WHL	7	1	0	1	12	4	2	0	2	10
1925–26	Victoria Cougars	St-Cup	—	—	—	—	—	4	0	0	0	14
1926–27	Chicago Black Hawks	NHL	44	14	6	20	89	2	1	0	1	6
1927–28	Chicago Black Hawks	NHL	11	1	1	2	10	—	—	—	—	—
1927–28	Detroit Cougars	NHL	30	3	1	4	50	—	—	—	—	—
1928–29	Detroit Olympics	Can-Pro	28	0	0	0	27	7	1	1	2	23
1928–29	Detroit Cougars	NHL	14	0	0	0	12	—	—	—	—	—
1929–30	Montreal Canadiens	NHL	10	0	0	0	4	—	—	—	—	—
1929–30	Providence Reds	Can-Am	7	5	1	6	34	—	—	—	—	—
1929–30	Pittsburgh Pirates	NHL	30	6	4	10	37	—	—	—	—	—
1930–31	Philadelphia Quakers	NHL	5	0	0	0	22	—	—	—	—	—
1930–31	Pittsburgh Yellow Jackets	IHL	38	7	3	10	75	—	—	—	—	—
1931–32	Pittsburgh Yellow Jackets	IHL	45	10	15	25	90	—	—	—	—	—
1932–33	London Tecumsehs	IHL	44	3	8	11	60	6	0	0	0	16
1933–34	Seattle Seahawks	NWHL	27	11	8	19	48	—	—	—	—	—
1933–34	London Tecumsehs	IHL	6	0	0	0	4	—	—	—	—	—
1934–35	Portland Buckaroos	NWHL	32	10	7	17	66	3	1	0	1	10
1935–36	Pittsburgh Shamrocks	IHL	15	4	2	6	14	—	—	—	—
NHL totals			144	24	12	36	224	2	1	0	1	6
