= Clem Loughlin =

Canadian ice hockey player

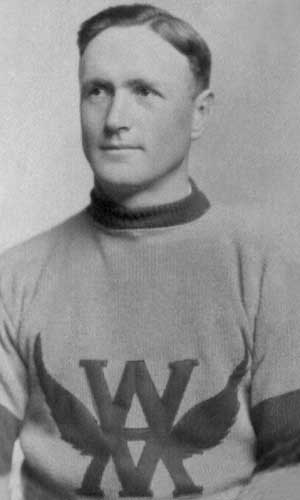
- Born: November 15, 1892 Carroll, Manitoba, Canada
- Died: January 28, 1977 (aged 84) Viking, Alberta, Canada
- Height: 6 ft 0 in (183 cm)
- Weight: 180 lb (82 kg; 12 st 12 lb)
- Position: Defence
- Shot: Left
- Played for: Winnipeg Monarchs; Winnipeg Strathconas; Portland Rosebuds; Victoria Aristocrats/Cougars; Detroit Cougars; Chicago Black Hawks; Kitchener Millionaires; London Panthers; London Tecumsehs
- Playing career: 1910–1932

Clement Joseph Loughlin (November 15, 1892 – January 28, 1977) was a Canadian professional ice hockey defenceman who played hockey for the Victoria Cougars of the Pacific Coast Hockey Association and the Western Canada Hockey League, and the Detroit Cougars and Chicago Black Hawks of the National Hockey League. He was captain when the Victoria Cougars won the Stanley Cup in 1925. Clem Loughlin also coached the Chicago Black Hawks for three seasons starting with the 1934–35 season.

His younger brother Wilf Loughlin was also a professional hockey player and the two played together on the Victoria Aristocrats and Victoria Cougars teams in the PCHA.

In 1915, Loughlin won the Allan Cup as a member of the Winnipeg Monarchs.

== Career statistics ==
=== Regular season and playoffs ===
			Regular season					Playoffs
Season	Team	League	GP	G	A	Pts	PIM	GP	G	A	Pts	PIM
1910–11	Winnipeg Monarchs	MHL-Sr.	1	0	0	0	—	—	—	—	—	—
1911–12	Winnipeg Monarchs	MHL-Sr.	—	—	—	—	—	—	—	—	—	—
1912–13	Winnipeg Strathconas	WSrHL	8	3	0	3	—	2	1	0	1	0
1912–13	Winnipeg Monarchs	MHL-Sr.	1	0	0	0	0	—	—	—	—	—
1913–14	Winnipeg Monarchs	MHL-Sr.	1	1	0	1	0	—	—	—	—	—
1913–14	Winnipeg Strathconas	MHL-Sr.	12	6	0	6	—	—	—	—	—	—
1914–15	Winnipeg Monarchs	MHL-Sr.	5	2	3	5	12	8	6	0	6	10
1915–16	Winnipeg Monarchs	WSrHL	8	1	1	2	6	2	0	0	0	0
1916–17	Portland Rosebuds	PCHA	24	3	1	4	43	—	—	—	—	—
1917–18	Portland Rosebuds	PCHA	16	2	0	2	6	—	—	—	—	—
1918–19	Victoria Aristocrats	PCHA	16	1	3	4	3	—	—	—	—	—
1919–20	Victoria Aristocrats	PCHA	22	2	2	4	18	—	—	—	—	—
1920–21	Victoria Aristocrats	PCHA	24	7	3	10	21	—	—	—	—	—
1921–22	Victoria Aristocrats	PCHA	24	6	3	9	6	—	—	—	—	—
1922–23	Victoria Cougars	PCHA	30	12	10	22	24	2	0	0	0	4
1923–24	Victoria Cougars	PCHA	30	10	7	17	26	—	—	—	—	—
1924–25	Victoria Cougars	WCHL	28	9	2	11	46	4	0	1	1	2
1924–25	Victoria Cougars	St-Cup	—	—	—	—	—	4	1	0	1	4
1925–26	Victoria Cougars	WHL	30	7	3	10	52	4	0	2	2	6
1925–26	Victoria Cougars	St-Cup	—	—	—	—	—	4	1	0	1	8
1926–27	Detroit Cougars	NHL	34	7	3	10	40	—	—	—	—	—
1927–28	Detroit Cougars	NHL	43	1	2	3	21	—	—	—	—	—
1928–29	Chicago Black Hawks	NHL	24	0	1	1	16	—	—	—	—	—
1928–29	Kitchener Millionaires	Can-Pro	18	3	1	4	21	3	0	0	0	8
1929–30	London Panthers	IHL	40	5	2	7	37	2	0	0	0	0
1930–31	London Tecumsehs	IHL	46	4	7	11	50	—	—	—	—	—
1931–32	London Tecumsehs	IHL	42	0	0	0	2	6	0	0	0	0
PCHA totals			186	43	29	72	147	2	0	0	0	4
NHL totals			101	8	6	14	77	—	—	—	—	—

== Coaching record ==
Team	Year	Regular season						Postseason
Team	Year	G	W	L	T	Pts	Division rank	Result
CHI	1934–35	48	26	17	5	57	2nd in American	Lost in first round (0-1 vs. MTM)
CHI	1935–36	48	21	19	8	50	3rd in American	Lost in first round (5-7 vs. NYA)
CHI	1936–37	48	14	27	7	35	4th in American	Missed playoffs
Total		144	61	63	20	142		

== Awards and achievements ==
- Allan Cup Championship – 1915 with the Winnipeg Monarchs
- PCHA Second All-Star Team – 1921, 1922 and 1923
- PCHA First All-Star Team – 1924
- Stanley Cup Championship – 1925 with the Victoria Cougars of the WCHL
- Honoured Member of the Manitoba Hockey Hall of Fame

Preceded by Tommy Gorman	Head coach of the Chicago Black Hawks; 1934–37	Succeeded by Bill Stewart
