= Smokey Harris =

Canadian ice hockey player

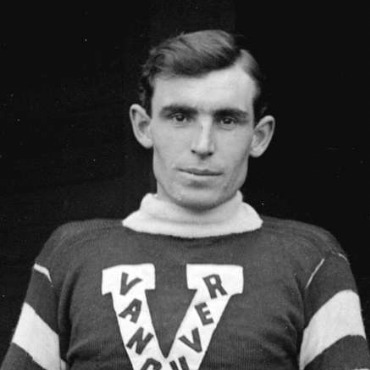
- Smokey Harris with the 1913–14 Vancouver Millionaires.
- Born: October 11, 1890 Port Arthur, Ontario, Canada
- Died: June 4, 1974 (aged 83)
- Height: 5 ft 11 in (180 cm)
- Weight: 165 lb (75 kg; 11 st 11 lb)
- Position: Left wing/Rover
- Shot: Left
- Played for: Vancouver Millionaires; Portland Rosebuds; Vancouver Maroons; Seattle Metropolitans; Boston Bruins; Edmonton Eskimos
- Playing career: 1911–1932

Thomas Wilfred "Smokey, Fred" Harris (October 11, 1890 – June 4, 1974) was a Canadian professional ice hockey player. Harris played in the Pacific Coast Hockey Association (PCHA), the National Hockey League (NHL) and the Western Canada Hockey League (WCHL). Harris was born in Port Arthur, Ontario. His brother Henry was also a professional ice hockey player. Harris scored the first goal in Boston Bruins' franchise history.

== Hockey career ==
Harris first played senior hockey with the Kenora Thistles in the 1909–10 season. In 1911, he joined the Vancouver Millionaires of the PCHA, playing three seasons before being traded to the Portland Rosebuds before the 1914–15 season. He played four seasons for Portland but abandoned the team after the final season (1917–18) to join the army.

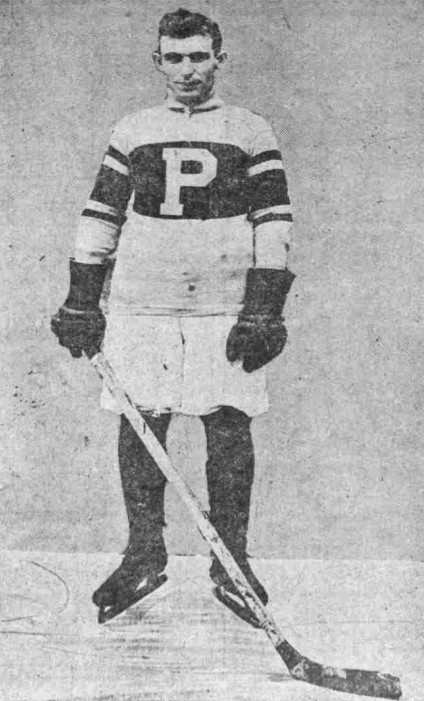
Harris with the Portland Rosebuds.

Portland won the PCHA championship in 1916, briefly taking over the Stanley Cup before losing it in the 1916 Stanley Cup Final to the Montreal Canadiens. After Portland folded, Harris returned to the Millionaires, playing another five seasons. With Vancouver, Harris played in the 1921 and 1923 Stanley Cup series, both times against the Ottawa Senators.

After one season with the Seattle Metropolitans, he was traded to the Boston Bruins of the NHL, scoring the Bruins' first-ever NHL goal on December 1, 1924 in the team's NHL debut game against the other NHL expansion team that year, the Montreal Maroons. Harris's second-period goal tied the game 1-1. Boston prevailed 2-1. Harris played six games for the Bruins before being traded again, to the Vancouver Maroons of the WCHL, the renamed Millionaires franchise.

After one season with Vancouver, Harris moved to California where, except for 1926–27 where he played for the Edmonton Eskimos of the Prairie League, he played out his career for teams in Los Angeles and San Francisco in the California Pro League. His final season was 1931–32 for the San Francisco Rangers. He was briefly playing coach for the Los Angeles Richfield Oil in 1925–26, and coached a full season for the Hollywood Millionaires in 1929–30.

== Playing style ==
Fred Harris played primarily as a left winger, where he would make good use of his speed skating down the rink side. Vancouver Daily World prior to the 1921–22 PCHA season described Harris' rushes along the boards in "famous 'fly-on-the-wall'" terms. He was not only a capable goalscorer but also a strong set-up man, which he showed during the 1920–21 PCHA season where his 17 assists led the league and helped him to a shared first place in the overall scoring race (32 points) with Frank Fredrickson of the Victoria Aristocrats. He also co-led (with Art Duncan) the PCHA in assists during the 1923–24 PCHA season with 10 helpers.

Harris also played occasionally as a rover, an archaic position between the offensive defenceman and the centre forward position, where he would display more defensive responsibilities. A match report in the Vancouver Daily World from the 1919–20 PCHA season, covering a game between the Vancouver Millionaires and the Seattle Metropolitans, described Harris' use of the hook-check in breaking up Seattle attacks with the characteristic sweeping motion of the stick along the ice.

== Career statistics ==
=== Regular season and playoffs ===
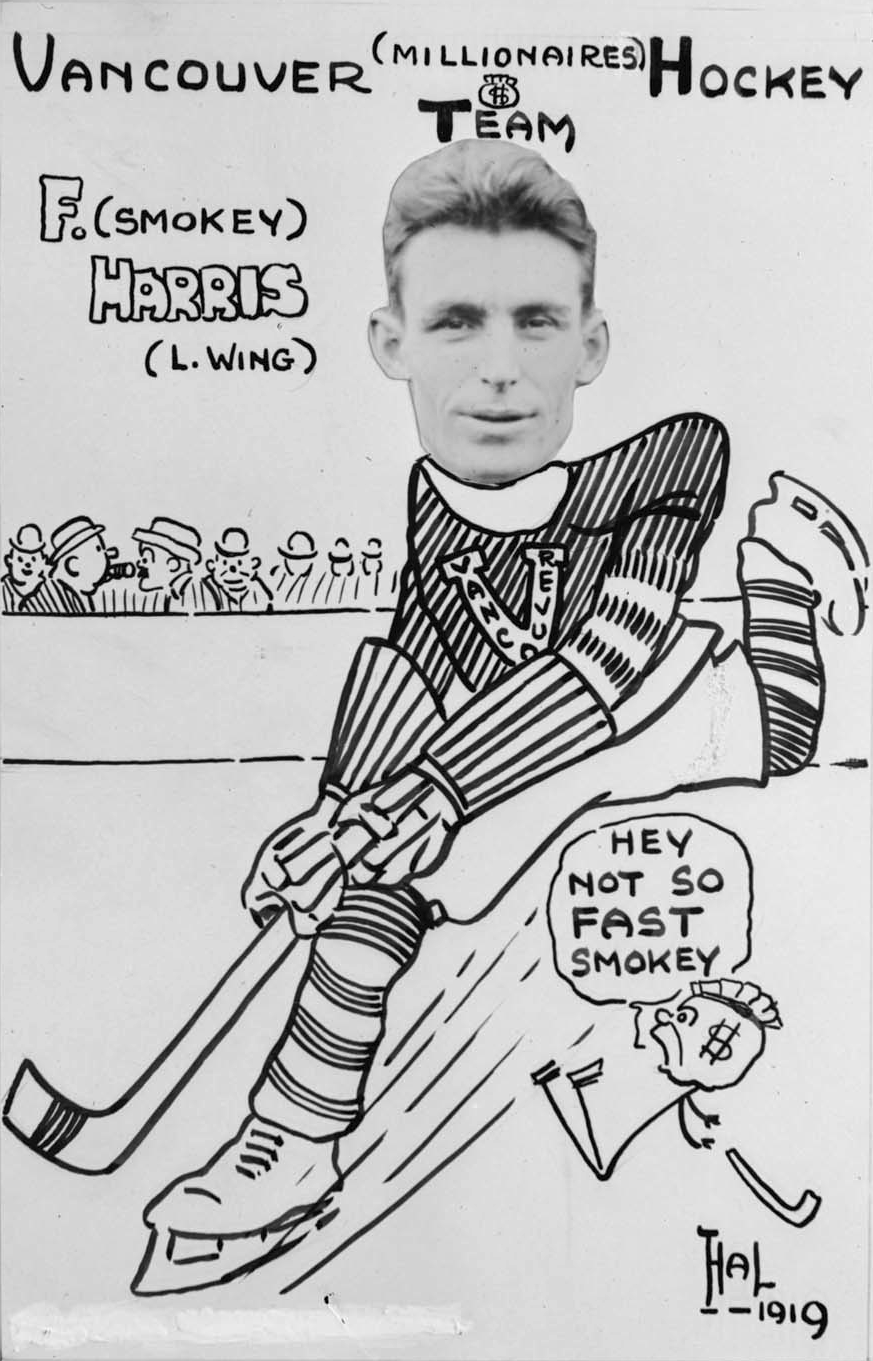
Caricature of Smokey Harris with the Vancouver Millionaires, 1919.

			Regular season					Playoffs
Season	Team	League	GP	G	A	Pts	PIM	GP	G	A	Pts	PIM
1910–11	Kenora Thistles	MHL	6	13	0	13	—	2	3	0	3	—
1911–12	Vancouver Millionaires	PCHA	15	4	0	4	55	—	—	—	—	—
1912–13	Vancouver Millionaires	PCHA	16	14	6	20	61	—	—	—	—	—
1913–14	Vancouver Millionaires	PCHA	15	14	3	17	33	—	—	—	—	—
1914–15	Portland Rosebuds	PCHA	18	14	3	17	39	—	—	—	—	—
1915–16	Portland Rosebuds	PCHA	18	10	6	16	75	—	—	—	—	—
1915–16	Portland Rosebuds	St-Cup	—	—	—	—	—	5	4	0	4	21
1916–17	Portland Rosebuds	PCHA	23	18	13	31	39	—	—	—	—	—
1917–18	Portland Rosebuds	PCHA	8	6	5	11	19	—	—	—	—	—
1918–19	Vancouver Millionaires	PCHA	20	19	6	25	19	2	2	0	2	3
1919–20	Vancouver Millionaires	PCHA	22	14	11	25	12	2	0	1	1	0
1920–21	Vancouver Millionaires	PCHA	24	15	17	32	6	2	6	2	8	0
1920–21	Vancouver Millionaires	St-Cup	—	—	—	—	—	5	2	1	3	6
1921–22	Vancouver Millionaires	PCHA	23	10	4	14	21	—	—	—	—	—
1922–23	Vancouver Maroons	PCHA	20	10	6	16	26	2	0	0	0	0
1922–23	Vancouver Maroons	St-Cup	—	—	—	—	—	4	1	0	1	8
1923–24	Seattle Metropolitans	PCHA	30	8	10	18	30	2	0	0	0	4
1924–25	Boston Bruins	NHL	6	3	1	4	8	—	—	—	—	—
1924–25	Vancouver Maroons	WCHL	14	0	1	1	16	—	—	—	—	—
1926–27	Edmonton Eskimos	PrHL	32	12	12	24	68	—	—	—	—	—
1927–28	Los Angeles Richfield Oil	Cal-Pro	21	10	5	15	26	—	—	—	—	—
1928–29	San Francisco Tigers	Cal-Pro	36	13	13	26	43	—	—	—	—	—
1929–30	Hollywood Millionaires	Cal-Pro	42	7	12	19	28	—	—	—	—	—
1930–31	San Francisco Tigers	Cal-Pro	31	8	10	18	—	—	—	—	—	—
1931–32	San Francisco Rangers	Cal-Pro	30	3	8	11	—	—	—	—	—	—
PCHA totals			252	156	90	246	416	10	8	3	11	7
NHL totals			6	3	1	4	8	—	—	—	—	—

=== Awards ===
- PCHA First All-Star Team – 1913, 1916, 1920
- PCHA Second All-Star Team – 1922

=== Transactions ===
- January 1, 1914 – Traded to Portland (PCHA) by Vancouver (PCHA) for Ken Mallen
- November 29, 1918 – Transferred to Vancouver (PCHA) after Portland (PCHA) franchise folded
- October 30, 1923 – Traded to Seattle (PCHA) by Vancouver (PCHA) for cash
- November 2, 1924 – Traded to Boston (NHL) by Seattle (PCHA) for cash
- December 21, 1924 – Traded to Vancouver (WCHL) by Boston for cash
- December 3, 1926 – Signed as a free agent by Edmonton (PrHL)
- October 17, 1927 – Signed as a free agent by LA Richfield (Cal-Pro)
