= Gizzy Hart =

Canadian ice hockey player (1904–1964)

- Born: June 1, 1901 Brandon, Manitoba, Canada
- Died: June 22, 1964 (aged 63) Weyburn, Saskatchewan, Canada
- Height: 5 ft 9 in (175 cm)
- Weight: 170 lb (77 kg; 12 st 2 lb)
- Position: Left wing
- Shot: Left
- Played for: Victoria Cougars; Detroit Cougars; Montreal Canadiens
- Playing career: 1918–1938

Wilfred Harold "Gizzy" Hart (June 1, 1901 — June 22, 1964) was a Canadian ice hockey player who played 99 games in the National Hockey League with the Detroit Cougars and Montreal Canadiens between 1926 and 1933. Prior to the NHL he played in the Pacific Coast Hockey Association and Western Canada Hockey League for the Victoria Cougars between 1923 and 1926, winning the Stanley Cup in 1925 as the last non-NHL team to do so. He scored the game-winning goal in Game 4 to clinch the series for Victoria. Hart was born in Brandon, Manitoba, but grew up in Weyburn, Saskatchewan.

He was short and stocky but a fast skater. He also played baseball.

== Career statistics ==
=== Regular season and playoffs ===
			Regular season					Playoffs
Season	Team	League	GP	G	A	Pts	PIM	GP	G	A	Pts	PIM
1918–19	Weyburn Wanderers	SSHL	5	10	1	11	0	—	—	—	—	—
1919–20	Weyburn Wanderers	SSHL	10	16	0	16	0	2	2	0	2	0
1920–21	Weyburn Wanderers	SSHL	11	2	2	4	0	—	—	—	—	—
1921–22	Moose Jaw Maple Leafs	SSHL	7	3	0	3	2	—	—	—	—	—
1922–23	Weyburn Wanderers	SSHL	10	17	6	23	4	5	6	2	8	2
1923–24	Victoria Cougars	PCHA	29	15	1	16	10	—	—	—	—	—
1924–25	Victoria Cougars	WCHL	26	8	6	14	8	4	0	0	0	0
1924–25	Victoria Cougars	St-Cup	—	—	—	—	—	4	2	1	3	0
1925–26	Victoria Cougars	WHL	27	6	4	10	2	2	1	0	1	2
1925–26	Victoria Cougars	St-Cup	—	—	—	—	—	4	0	0	0	4
1926–27	Detroit Cougars	NHL	3	0	0	0	0	—	—	—	—	—
1926–27	Windsor Hornets	Can-Pro	5	4	1	5	6	—	—	—	—	—
1926–27	Montreal Canadiens	NHL	34	3	4	7	8	4	0	0	0	0
1927–28	Montreal Canadiens	NHL	44	3	2	5	4	2	0	0	0	0
1928–29	Providence Reds	Can-Am	38	13	1	14	14	6	1	0	1	2
1929–30	Providence Reds	Can-Am	39	24	12	36	28	3	2	3	5	0
1930–31	Providence Reds	Can-Am	37	25	13	38	16	2	1	1	2	0
1931–32	Providence Reds	Can-Am	40	21	17	38	29	5	2	2	4	6
1932–33	Montreal Canadiens	NHL	18	0	3	3	0	—	—	—	—	—
1932–33	Providence Reds	Can-Am	46	7	9	16	60	—	—	—	—	—
1933–34	Providence Reds	Can-Am	40	13	9	22	12	3	0	4	4	7
1934–35	Weyburn Beavers	SSHL	1	0	0	0	0	—	—	—	—	—
1935–36	Weyburn Beavers	SSHL	—	—	—	—	—	—	—	—	—	—
1936–37	Weyburn Beavers	SSHL	—	—	—	—	—	—	—	—	—	—
1937–38	Weyburn Beavers	SSHL	1	0	0	0	0	—	—	—	—	—
PCHA/WCHL/WHL totals			82	29	11	40	20	6	1	0	1	2
NHL totals			99	6	9	15	12	8	0	1	1	0
