= 1926–27 NHL season =

Professional ice hockey league season

- League: National Hockey League
- Sport: Ice hockey
- Duration: November 16, 1926 – April 13, 1927
- Games: 44
- Teams: 10

Regular season
- Season champions: Ottawa Senators
- Season MVP: Herb Gardiner (Canadiens)
- Top scorer: Bill Cook (Rangers)
- Canadian Division champions: Ottawa Senators
- American Division champions: New York Rangers

Stanley Cup
- Champions: Ottawa Senators
- Runners-up: Boston Bruins

NHL seasons
- ← 1925–26 1927–28 →

The 1926–27 NHL season was the tenth season of the National Hockey League. The success of the Boston Bruins and the Pittsburgh Pirates led the NHL to expand further within the United States. The league added three new teams: the Chicago Black Hawks, Detroit Cougars, and New York Rangers, to make a total of ten, split in two divisions. This resulted in teams based in Canada being in the minority for the first time. To stock the teams with players the new teams brought in players from the Western Hockey League, which folded in May 1926. This left the NHL in sole possession of hockey's top players, as well as sole control of hockey's top trophy, the Stanley Cup, which was won by the Ottawa Senators. This was the original Senators' eleventh and final Stanley Cup win. The Senators' first was in 1903.

== League business ==
NHL expansion was the main topic of discussion between the NHL owners at the April 1926 and May 1, 1926 league meetings. The new New York Rangers franchise was approved in principle after the Madison Square Gardens president Hammond agreed to revenue sharing. President Calder, plus owners Strachan and Dandurand formed a committee to study franchise candidates in Chicago, Detroit, Jersey City and Philadelphia, while further applications from Cleveland, New York, Chicago, Philadelphia and Detroit were received. The owners were split on which new franchises to accept. Part of the disagreement was over the Chicago franchise. Sports promoter Paddy Harmon had announced a new Chicago Stadium and backed a team in partnership with Thomas Duggan, while Madison Square Garden's Tex Rickard wanted to build a Chicago Madison Square Garden with the participation of Huntington Hardwick.

At the 1926 Stanley Cup Finals, WHL president Frank Patrick had begun shopping the WHL's players to the NHL, hoping to raise $300,000 to distribute to the WHL owners. Patrick approached Art Ross of the Bruins, who agreed to purchase the contracts of Frank Fredrickson, Eddie Shore, and Duke Keats. After the series, Patrick approached the new New York Rangers owner Charles Hammond and their general manager Conn Smythe, but they were turned down. Patrick and Ross approached the Bruins' owner who agreed to purchase the entire lot of players for $250,000, and gave Patrick a $50,000 check as a deposit. He planned to keep some of the players for the Bruins, sell twelve players each to the new Chicago and Detroit franchises and distribute the rest to the rest of the league.

At a May 14 meeting, the NHL awarded the Detroit franchise to the syndicate of Wesson Seybourn and John Townsend, formed by Charles A. Hughes. The split over the new Chicago franchise prevented its immediate acceptance as a new franchise required unanimity. However, the NHL governors could amend their constitution with a two-thirds vote, and they amended the constitution at the May 14 meeting to lower the bar for a new franchise to a simple majority vote. The governors agreed that Huntwick would get the Chicago franchise. Huntwick proceeded to buy the Portland Rosebuds and the Hughes group purchased the Victoria Cougars, each for $100,000. The Bruins took Fredrickson, Shore, Keats and others, while the Rangers took Frank Boucher. In total, the player's contracts purchased that day totalled $267,000 for Patrick to take back to the WHL. On May 15, the NHL awarded the franchises to the Hardwick and Hughes consortiums, with provisos that each team would have an NHL-ready team for September 1, and new arenas by November 10.

At the September 25, 1926, NHL meeting, the Chicago Black Hawks, Detroit Cougars and New York Rangers were added to the league. The Hughes consortium proceeded with the purchase of the Cougars and the franchise, while the Chicago franchise instead went to Frederic McLaughlin, who took over the deal from Huntwick on June 1. The NHL's second franchise in New York City went to the Madison Square Garden syndicate of John S. Hammond. Both Detroit and Chicago had not begun construction on arenas. Detroit would play in Windsor, Ontario at the Border Cities Arena, while the Black Hawks played at the Chicago Coliseum.

Toronto bought the players of the Saskatoon franchise separately, and Montreal claimed George Hainsworth. The rest of the WHL players would be distributed by a committee of Frank Calder, Leo Dandurand and James Strachan. The former WHL players made an impact in the NHL. The top scorer was Bill Cook, the top goalie was George Hainsworth, and defenceman Herb Gardiner was the league MVP.

A special meeting was held on October 26 at which the NHL was split into the Canadian and American divisions. It was the first divisional format to be implemented in a major professional North American sports league. To balance the divisions, the New York Americans were placed in the Canadian Division. With the new divisional alignment came an altered playoff format: the top team from each division would meet the winner of a total-goals series between the second and third place teams from their divisions. The winners of those total-goals series would meet in a best-of-five Stanley Cup Finals.

The Central Hockey League changed its name to the American Hockey Association. The new AHA signed an agreement of co-operation with the NHL, wanting to place itself on an equal footing with the NHL, but non-competitive. However, the new AHA placed franchises in Chicago and Detroit, competing with NHL teams. The Chicago Cardinals were backed by old nemesis Eddie Livingstone and became a source of friction with the NHL. Calder declared that several of the Cardinals' players were illegally signed and broke off the agreement with the AHA. The AHA could not compete with the NHL and the Detroit franchise folded in December, and the Chicago franchise folded in March. The AHA then signed another cooperation agreement with the NHL and forced Livingstone out.

Majority ownership of the Toronto St. Patricks was sold on February 14, 1927 to a syndicate headed by Conn Smythe for CA$160,000 (equivalent to $2,887,033 in 2025). Nathan Nathanson sold his interest entirely, while J. P. Bickell retained his share of the company. The club was officially renamed the Toronto Maple Leafs and Bickell became its president, but the league ruled that the team must remain using the St. Patricks name until season's end.

=== Rules changes ===
The blue lines moved to sixty feet from the goal line from twenty feet from the center red line to increase the size of the neutral zone.

Two innovations attributed to Art Ross are adopted by the NHL. The league adopts a modified puck, which has rounded edges. The net is modified to keep the puck in the webbing.

== Arena changes ==
- The expansion Chicago Black Hawks moved into Chicago Coliseum.
- The expansion Detroit Cougars played this season at Border Cities Arena in Windsor, Ontario, while Olympia Stadium remained under construction.
- The Montreal Canadiens moved from Mount Royal Arena to the Montreal Forum, sharing it with the Maroons.
- The expansion New York Rangers moved into the third building named Madison Square Garden, sharing it with the Americans.

== Regular season ==
The Montreal Canadiens, last place finishers in 1925–26, solved their goaltending woes by signing George Hainsworth. They further strengthened their team by signing Herb Gardiner of the Western League's Calgary Tigers for defence. The Canadiens finished second in the Canadian Division to powerful Ottawa, who was the league's best team.

Dave Gill, secretary-treasurer (general manager), decided to take over as coach of the Ottawa Senators. He would be assisted by Frank Shaughnessy, a former manager of the Senators in the NHA days, to assist him with the strategy used in games. Ottawa finished first atop the Canadian Division.

The arena is not ready in Detroit for the start of the regular season. The expansion Cougars play their first 22 home games just across the Canada–United States border in Windsor, Ontario, at the Border Cities Arena.

On December 4, 1926, Cy Denneny and Frank Finnigan were seriously injured in a car accident. Finnigan suffered a slightly fractured skull and Denneny was badly gashed.

New York Americans right winger Shorty Green's career was ended after an injury in a game on February 27, 1927. New York Rangers defenceman Taffy Abel bodychecked Green, caused a kidney injury that requires an emergency operation to remove the kidney; Abel retired for health reasons.

=== Final standings ===
Note: W = Wins, L = Losses, T = Ties, Pts = Points, GF= Goals For, GA = Goals Against

Canadian Division
	GP	W	L	T	GF	GA	Pts
Ottawa Senators	44	30	10	4	86	69	64
Montreal Canadiens	44	28	14	2	99	67	58
Montreal Maroons	44	20	20	4	71	68	44
New York Americans	44	17	25	2	82	91	36
Toronto St. Patricks	44	15	24	5	79	94	35

American Division
	GP	W	L	T	GF	GA	Pts
New York Rangers	44	25	13	6	95	72	56
Boston Bruins	44	21	20	3	97	89	45
Chicago Black Hawks	44	19	22	3	115	116	41
Pittsburgh Pirates	44	15	26	3	79	108	33
Detroit Cougars	44	12	28	4	76	105	28

== Playoffs ==
=== Playoff bracket ===
With the collapse of the Western Hockey League, the Stanley Cup became the championship trophy of the NHL, and the Stanley Cup playoffs became synonymous with the NHL's postseason. The new division alignment and playoff format also guaranteed that the first American NHL team would make the Cup Finals.

The top three teams in each division qualified for the playoffs. In the first round, the second-place team in each division played against the third-place team from their division. Each division winner received a first round bye, then met the first round winner from their division in the second round. The two divisional playoff winners then advanced to the Stanley Cup Finals. In the first two rounds, teams competed in a two-game total-goals series. The Stanley Cup Finals was instead competed in a best-of-three format, with ties allowed for a maximum of five games.

Quarterfinals
C2	Mtl Canadiens	2G
C3	Mtl Maroons	1G
A2	Boston	10G
A3	Chicago	5G

Semifinals
C1	Ottawa	5G
C2	Mtl Canadiens	1G
A1	NY Rangers	1G
A2	Boston	3G

Finals
C1	Ottawa	2
A2	Boston	0

=== Quarterfinals ===
==== (C2) Montreal Canadiens vs. (C3) Montreal Maroons ====
March 29	Montreal Canadiens	1–1	Montreal Maroons	Montreal Forum	Recap
Aurele Joliat (1) – 19:57		First period	No scoring
No scoring		Second period	12:15 – Babe Siebert (1)
No scoring		Third period	No scoring
George Hainsworth		Goalie stats	Clint Benedict

March 31	Montreal Maroons	0–1	OT	Montreal Canadiens	Montreal Forum	Recap
No scoring		First period		No scoring
No scoring		Second period		No scoring
No scoring		Third period		No scoring
No scoring		First overtime period		12:05 – Howie Morenz (1)
Clint Benedict		Goalie stats		George Hainsworth

Montreal Canadiens won series on total goals 2–1

==== (A2) Boston Bruins vs. (A3) Chicago Black Hawks ====
Game one of this series was played in New York.

March 29	Boston Bruins	6–1	Chicago Black Hawks	Madison Square Garden III	Recap
Frank Fredrickson (1) – 03:24; Sprague Cleghorn (1) – 14:36; Jimmy Herberts (1) – 16:57		First period	No scoring
No scoring		Second period	09:43 – Gord Fraser (1)
Frank Fredrickson (2) – 08:26; Harry Oliver (1) – 14:55; Eddie Shore (1) – 16:55		Third period	No scoring
Hal Winkler		Goalie stats	Hugh Lehman

March 31	Chicago Black Hawks	4–4	Boston Bruins	Boston Arena	Recap
No scoring		First period	No scoring
George Hay (1) – 16:00; Dick Irvin (1) – 18:00		Second period	05:00 – Percy Galbraith (1); 10:00 – Billy Coutu (1); 15:00 – Percy Galbraith (2)
Cully Wilson (1) – 07:00; Dick Irvin (2) – 10:00		Third period	04:00 – Percy Galbraith (3)
Hugh Lehman		Goalie stats	Hal Winkler

Boston won series on total goals 10–5

=== Semifinals ===
==== (C1) Ottawa Senators vs. (C2) Montreal Canadiens ====
April 2	Ottawa Senators	4–0	Montreal Canadiens	Montreal Forum	Recap
Cy Denneny (1) – 09:45; Hec Kilrea (1) – 10:10; Hooley Smith (1) – 17:40		First period	No scoring
Frank Nighbor (1) – 11:40		Second period	No scoring
No scoring		Third period	No scoring
Alec Connell		Goalie stats	George Hainsworth

April 4	Montreal Canadiens	1–1	Ottawa Senators	Ottawa Auditorium	Recap
Sylvio Mantha (1) – 11:40		First period	No scoring
No scoring		Second period	12:58 – Frank Finnigan (1)
No scoring		Third period	No scoring
George Hainsworth		Goalie stats	Alec Connell

Ottawa won series on total goals 5–1

==== (A1) New York Rangers vs. (A2) Boston Bruins ====
April 2	New York Rangers	0–0	Boston Bruins	Boston Arena	Recap
No scoring		First period	No scoring
No scoring		Second period	No scoring
No scoring		Third period	No scoring
Lorne Chabot		Goalie stats	Hal Winkler

April 4	Boston Bruins	3–1	New York Rangers	Madison Square Garden III	Recap
No scoring		First period	04:51 – Bill Cook (1)
Jimmy Herberts (2) – 07:42; Lionel Hitchman (1) – 17:33; Harry Oliver (2) – 18:37		Second period	No scoring
No scoring		Third period	No scoring
Hal Winkler		Goalie stats	Lorne Chabot

Boston won series on total goals 3–1

=== Stanley Cup Finals ===
The Stanley Cup Finals was originally intended to be a best-of-three series, but a game could end as a tie after one overtime period. After the first game was declared a tie, NHL president Frank Calder ruled that the series would go no more than five games. If the teams were still tied after five games, the teams would share the championship. In the end, the series went four games, with two ties and two Ottawa wins to win the Cup.

April 7	Ottawa Senators	0–0	OT	Boston Bruins	Boston Arena	Recap
No scoring		First period		No scoring
No scoring		Second period		No scoring
No scoring		Third period		No scoring
No scoring		First overtime period		No scoring
Alec Connell		Goalie stats		Hal Winkler

April 9	Ottawa Senators	3–1	Boston Bruins	Boston Arena	Recap
King Clancy (1) – 06:37; Frank Finnigan (2) – 11:23		First period	No scoring
No scoring		Second period	No scoring
Cy Denneny (2) – 19:55		Third period	16:45 – Harry Oliver (3)
Alec Connell		Goalie stats	Hal Winkler

April 11	Boston Bruins	1–1	OT	Ottawa Senators	Ottawa Auditorium	Recap
Jimmy Herberts (3) – 07:00		First period		No scoring
No scoring		Second period		15:00 – Cy Denneny (3)
No scoring		Third period		No scoring
No scoring		First overtime period		No scoring
Hal Winkler		Goalie stats		Alec Connell

April 13	Boston Bruins	1–3	Ottawa Senators	Ottawa Auditorium	Recap
No scoring		First period	No scoring
No scoring		Second period	05:00 – Frank Finnigan (3); 07:30 – Cy Denneny (4)
Harry Oliver (4) – 17:50		Third period	11:00 – Cy Denneny (5)
Hal Winkler		Goalie stats	Alec Connell

Ottawa won series 2–0–2

== Awards ==
A new trophy in memory of Georges Vezina, the Vezina Trophy, was donated this year by Montreal Canadiens owners Leo Dandurand, Louis Letourneau and Joseph Cattarinich. It is to be presented to the league's "most valuable goaltender." It is won by his successor with the Canadiens, George Hainsworth.

1926–27 NHL awards
Hart Trophy: (Most valuable player)	Herb Gardiner, Montreal Canadiens
Lady Byng Trophy: (Excellence and sportsmanship)	Billy Burch, New York Americans
O'Brien Cup: (League champions)	Ottawa Senators
Prince of Wales Trophy: (League champions)	Ottawa Senators
Vezina Trophy: (Fewest goals allowed)	George Hainsworth, Montreal Canadiens

== Player statistics ==
=== Scoring leaders ===
Note: GP = Games played; G = Goals; A = Assists; Pts = Points

Player	Team	GP	G	A	Pts
Bill Cook	New York Rangers	44	33	4	37
Dick Irvin	Chicago Black Hawks	43	18	18	36
Howie Morenz	Montreal Canadiens	44	25	7	32
Frank Fredrickson	Detroit Cougars / Boston Bruins	44	18	13	31
Babe Dye	Chicago Black Hawks	41	25	5	30
Ace Bailey	Toronto St. Patricks	42	15	13	28
Frank Boucher	New York Rangers	44	13	15	28
Billy Burch	New York Americans	43	19	8	27
Harry Oliver	Boston Bruins	42	18	6	24
Duke Keats	Boston / Detroit Cougars	42	16	8	24

Source: NHL.

=== Leading goaltenders ===
Note: GP = Games played; Mins = Minutes played; GA = Goals against; SO = Shut outs; GAA = Goals against average

Player	Team	GP	Mins	GA	SO	GAA
Clint Benedict	Montreal Maroons	43	2748	65	13	1.42
Lorne Chabot	New York Rangers	36	2307	56	10	1.46
George Hainsworth	Montreal Canadiens	44	2732	67	14	1.47
Alex Connell	Ottawa Senators	44	2782	69	13	1.49
Hal Winkler	New York Rangers / Boston Bruins	31	1959	56	6	1.72
Jake Forbes	New York Americans	44	2715	91	8	2.01
John Ross Roach	Toronto St. Patricks	44	2764	94	4	2.04
Hap Holmes	Detroit Cougars	41	2685	100	6	2.23
Roy Worters	Pittsburgh Pirates	44	2711	108	4	2.39
Hugh Lehman	Chicago Black Hawks	44	2797	116	5	2.49

=== Playoff scoring leaders ===
Note: GP = Games played; G = Goals; A = Assists; Pts = Points

Player	Team	GP	G	A	Pts
Harry Oliver	Boston Bruins	8	4	2	6
Percy Galbraith	Boston Bruins	8	3	3	6

== Coaches ==
=== American Division ===
- Boston Bruins: Art Ross
- Chicago Black Hawks: Pete Muldoon
- Detroit Cougars: Art Duncan and Duke Keats
- New York Rangers: Lester Patrick
- Pittsburgh Pirates: Odie Cleghorn

=== Canadian Division ===
- Montreal Canadiens: Cecil Hart
- Montreal Maroons: Eddie Gerard
- New York Americans: Newsy Lalonde
- Ottawa Senators: Dave Gill
- Toronto St. Patricks: Charlie Querrie, Mike Rodden and Alex Romeril

== Debuts ==
The following is a list of players of note who played their first NHL game in 1926–27 (listed with their first team, asterisk(*) marks debut in playoffs):

- Percy Galbraith, Boston Bruins
- Eddie Shore, Boston Bruins
- Harry Oliver, Boston Bruins
- Duke Keats, Boston Bruins
- George Hay, Chicago Black Hawks
- Mickey MacKay, Chicago Black Hawks
- Dick Irvin, Chicago Black Hawks
- Frank Foyston, Detroit Cougars
- Jack Walker, Detroit Cougars
- Frank Fredrickson, Detroit Cougars
- George Hainsworth, Montreal Canadiens
- Art Gagne, Montreal Canadiens
- Herb Gardiner, Montreal Canadiens
- Hap Emms, Montreal Maroons
- Red Dutton, Montreal Maroons
- Norman Himes, New York Americans
- Paul Thompson, New York Rangers
- Bill Cook, New York Rangers
- Bun Cook, New York Rangers
- Murray Murdoch, New York Rangers
- Lorne Chabot, New York Rangers
- Clarence Abel, New York Rangers
- Ching Johnson, New York Rangers
- Danny Cox, Toronto St. Patricks
- Ace Bailey, Toronto St. Patricks
- Butch Keeling, Toronto St. Patricks
- Carl Voss, Toronto St. Patricks

== Last games ==
The following is a list of players of note that played their last game in the NHL in 1926–27 (listed with their last team):

- Shorty Green, New York Americans
- Newsy Lalonde, New York Americans
- Jack Adams, Ottawa Senators
- Bert Corbeau, Toronto St. Patricks

== Transactions ==
August 1, 1926	To Ottawa Senators Jack Adams	To Toronto St. Patricks cash
October 18, 1926	To Chicago Black Hawks Babe Dye	To Toronto St. Patricks $15,000 cash
October 18, 1926	To Detroit Cougars rights to Art Duncan	To Chicago Black Hawks Gord Fraser; Art Gagne
October 18, 1926	To Montreal Canadiens Art Gagne	To Chicago Black Hawks cash
October 22, 1926	To Boston Bruins Billy Coutu	To Montreal Canadiens Amby Moran
October 28, 1926	To Pittsburgh Pirates John McKinnon	To Montreal Canadiens cash
November 15, 1926	To New York Americans Laurie Scott	To Toronto St. Patricks Jesse Spring
December 12, 1926	To Montreal Canadiens Gizzy Hart	To Detroit Cougars cash
December 16, 1926	To Pittsburgh Pirates Charlie Langlois $2,000 cash	To New York Americans Lionel Conacher
January 1, 1927	To New York Rangers rights to Leo Bourgeault	To Toronto St. Patricks cash
January 6, 1927	To Montreal Maroons Russell Oatman	To Detroit Cougars cash
January 7, 1927	To Detroit Cougars Pete Bellefeuille	To Toronto St. Patricks Harold Halderson
January 7, 1927	To Detroit Cougars Archie Briden; Duke Keats	To Boston Bruins Frank Fredrickson; Harry Meeking
January 17, 1927	To Boston Bruins rights to Hal Winkler	To New York Rangers cash
January 17, 1927	To Boston Bruins Billy Boucher	To Montreal Canadiens Carson Cooper
January 18, 1927	To Ottawa Senators Stan Jackson	To Boston Bruins cash
January 31, 1927	To Detroit Cougars Jim Riley	To Chicago Black Hawks cash
April 11, 1927	To Detroit Cougars George Hay; Percy Traub	To Chicago Blackhawks $15,000 cash

== See also ==
- List of Stanley Cup champions
- Prairie Hockey League
- List of pre-NHL seasons
- 1926 in sports
- 1927 in sports
