= E. L. Richardson =

E. L. Richardson may refer to:

- E. L. Richardson (sports executive)
- E. L. Richardson (trade unionist)
