= Mickey MacKay =

Canadian ice hockey player (1894–1940)

- Hockey Hall of Fame, 1952
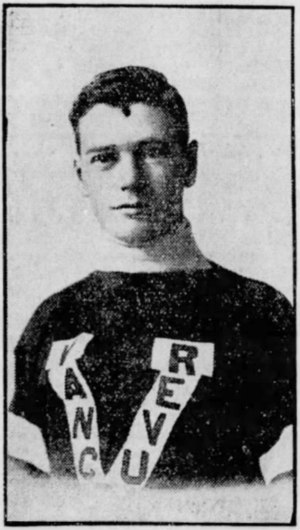
- MacKay with the Vancouver Millionaires during the 1914–15 season
- Born: May 25, 1894 Chesley, Ontario, Canada
- Died: May 30, 1940 (aged 46) near Ymir, British Columbia, Canada
- Height: 5 ft 9 in (175 cm)
- Weight: 160 lb (73 kg; 11 st 6 lb)
- Position: Centre
- Shot: Left
- Played for: Vancouver Millionaires; Chicago Black Hawks; Pittsburgh Pirates; Boston Bruins
- Playing career: 1914–1930

Duncan McMillan "Mickey" MacKay (May 25, 1894 – May 30, 1940) was a Canadian professional ice hockey centre and rover who played primarily in the Pacific Coast Hockey Association (PCHL) and Western Canada Hockey League (WCHL) for the Vancouver Millionaires (later Maroons). He moved to the National Hockey League (NHL) after the collapse of professional hockey in the west, and finished his career playing with the Chicago Black Hawks, Pittsburgh Pirates and Boston Bruins.

A gifted scorer, MacKay led the PCHA in goals three times, assists twice, and was the league's all-time leading scorer upon its demise. Lester Patrick called him the greatest centre to ever play in the coast league; he was named to the PCHA or WCHL first team all-star on seven occasions, and to the second team three times. MacKay won the Stanley Cup twice during his career: first with the Millionaires in 1915 and later with the Bruins in 1929. In 1952, he was inducted into the Hockey Hall of Fame.

== Early life ==
Duncan "Mickey" MacKay was born in Chesley, Ontario on May 21, 1894. He grew up on the family farm in Bruce County, near Chesley. He joined the Canadian Army at the age of 14 and briefly trained at the Valcartier training camp in Quebec until recruiting officers realized he was underage and discharged him from the service.

MacKay learned to skate at the age of 15 and spent two seasons playing senior hockey in Chesley. He moved west in 1912 to join the Edmonton Dominions of the Alberta Senior Hockey League where he led the league with eight playoff goals. While in Edmonton with the Dominions MacKay was a teammate of future Vancouver Millionaires teammate Barney Stanley. He left the Dominions following the season for a senior team in Grand Forks, British Columbia, where he was the provincial league's leading goalscorer with 15 goals in 1913–14.

== Professional career ==
Hoping to advance his career, MacKay wrote to Frank Patrick, operator of the Pacific Coast Hockey Association (PCHA), expressing his desire to turn professional. Patrick initially replied by suggesting the young player try out for a team closer to his hometown in Ontario. However, making what he described as a "sixth sense hunch", Patrick wrote a second letter inviting MacKay to try out for his team in Vancouver. Patrick doubted MacKay's ability the first time he saw him practice, but was convinced the second time around. He signed MacKay to a contract for the 1914–15 PCHA season on November 3, 1914. MacKay made his professional debut on December 8, playing on a line with Frank Nighbor and Ken Mallen and scored a hat trick in his first game. He finished the season as the league leader with 33 goals in just 17 games, and was named a first team all-star. Vancouver won the PCHA title, then defeated the Ottawa Senators to win the Stanley Cup. MacKay had four goals in the series in which Vancouver won all three games.

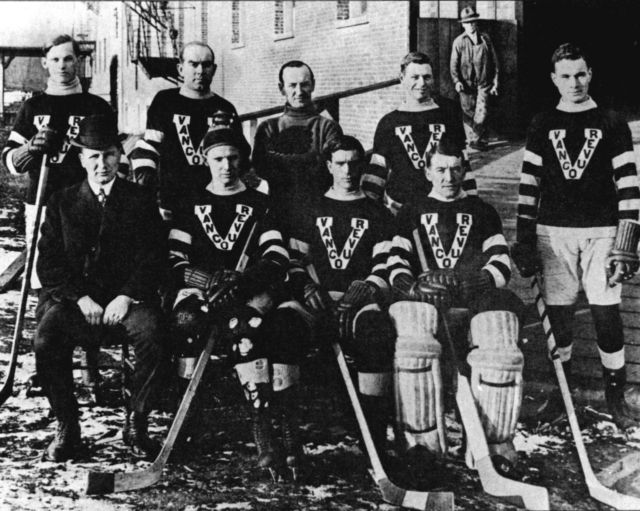
MacKay (back row, second from right) with the 1914–15 Vancouver Millionaires.

MacKay was a consistent PCHA all-star in the seasons that followed, earning berths on the second team in 1916, 1918 and 1921, and on the first team in 1917, 1919, 1922 and 1923. He posted a 22-goal season in 23 games in 1916–17, He played in his second Stanley Cup championship with the Millionaires in 1918, leading all skaters with five goals and five assists in five games. Though MacKay was held out as a star of the series, the Millionaires were defeated by the National Hockey League (NHL)'s Toronto Arenas in the fifth and deciding game of the series.

A late-season battle between the Millionaires and the Seattle Metropolitans in 1919 turned violent when Seattle's Cully Wilson slashed MacKay across the mouth late in the game. MacKay suffered a broken jaw and lost five teeth as a result, while Wilson was later banned from the PCHA for life. MacKay left the PCHA following the season, moving to Alberta where he bought a farm near the village of Elnora. He was one of several players who successfully petitioned the Alberta Amateur Athletic Union to regain his amateur status, and signed on to play with the Calgary Columbus Club of the newly formed Big-4 League.

MacKay returned to Vancouver and the professional ranks in 1920 amidst charges by Millionaires' owner Frank Patrick that the Big-4 was secretly paying players in violation of amateur standards. Calgary media suggested that MacKay was one of the players who had informed Patrick of the situation in Alberta, a charge that he denied. On the ice, he helped lead the Millionaires to the 1921 Stanley Cup Final, which they lost to the Ottawa Senators in five games.

Remaining a top scorer in the PCHA, MacKay led the league in assists with 12 in 1921–22 and in goals with 21 in 1923–24. The PCHA merged with the Western Canada Hockey League (WCHL) prior to the 1924–25 season, and MacKay led the WCHL in scoring with 27 goals that season. MacKay was named a WCHL first team all-star in 1925 and 1926. The Western League collapsed following the 1925–26 season, and MacKay's contract was sold to the newly formed Chicago Black Hawks in the National Hockey League. He was the all-time leading scorer amongst PCHA and WCHL players at the league's demise with 290 points.

In two years with the Black Hawks, MacKay scored 31 goals before his playing rights were sold to the Pittsburgh Pirates prior to the 1928–29 NHL season. He appeared in only ten games with the Pirates before he was traded to the Boston Bruins on December 20, 1928 in exchange for Frank Fredrickson. With the Bruins, MacKay also served as an assistant coach and manager. He won the second Stanley Cup championship of his career that season as Boston defeated the New York Rangers to win the title. MacKay played the 1929–30 season with the Bruins, continuing his management and coaching duties while playing depth minutes for a dominant team.

=== Legacy and playing style ===
MacKay was regarded by his contemporaries as one of the top players of his time. Lester Patrick praised his abilities: "He was perhaps the greatest centre we ever had on the coast. MacKay was a great crowd pleaser. He was clean, splendidly courageous, a happy player with a stylish way of going. He was one of those who helped make pro hockey a great game." His greatest limitation was his size, standing five foot nine and around 162 pounds; he frequently battled through injuries and missed many games throughout his career as a result. His nickname, "the wee Scot", was in reference to his diminutive size.

== Later life ==
Leaving the Bruins, MacKay settled near his wife's hometown of Grand Forks. He remained active in hockey, serving as a referee and coach in the area. He contemplated purchasing the Spokane Clippers of the minor professional Pacific Coast Hockey League in 1938 but decided against taking over the team. MacKay became involved in mining in the eastern Kootenays upon his return to British Columbia. He died on May 30, 1940, when traveling as part of his mining job after his vehicle left the road and hit a telephone pole near the village of Ymir. The medical examiner determined that he had suffered a heart attack, causing the crash.

MacKay was posthumously honoured by several organizations for his hockey career, and was inducted into the Hockey Hall of Fame in 1952. He was inducted into the British Columbia Sports Hall of Fame in 1989, and is an honoured member of the British Columbia Hockey Hall of Fame.

== Career statistics ==
=== Regular season and playoffs ===
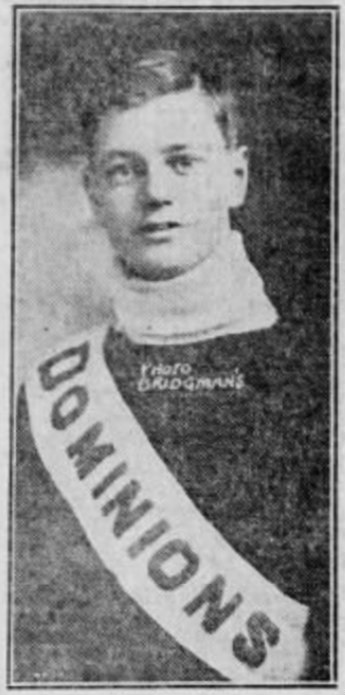
MacKay with the Edmonton Dominions.

			Regular season					Playoffs
Season	Team	League	GP	G	A	Pts	PIM	GP	G	A	Pts	PIM
1910–11	Chelsey ACC	OHA Jr	—	—	—	—	—	—	—	—	—	—
1911–12	Chelsey ACC	OHA Int	—	—	—	—	—	—	—	—	—	—
1912–13	Edmonton Dominions	ASHL	7	14	0	14	3	2	8	0	8	0
1913–14	Grand Forks AC	BDHL	—	—	—	—	—	—	—	—	—	—
1914–15	Vancouver Millionaires	PCHA	17	33	11	44	9	—	—	—	—	—
1914–15	Vancouver Millionaires	St-Cup	—	—	—	—	—	3	4	2	6	9
1915–16	Vancouver Millionaires	PCHA	14	12	7	19	32	—	—	—	—	—
1916–17	Vancouver Millionaires	PCHA	23	22	11	33	37	—	—	—	—	—
1917–18	Vancouver Millionaires	PCHA	18	10	8	18	31	2	2	1	3	0
1917–18	Vancouver Millionaires	St-Cup	—	—	—	—	—	5	5	5	10	12
1918–19	Vancouver Millionaires	PCHA	17	9	9	18	9	—	—	—	—	—
1919–20	Calgary Columbus Club	Big-4	11	4	6	10	14	—	—	—	—	—
1920–21	Vancouver Millionaires	PCHA	21	10	8	18	15	2	0	3	3	0
1920–21	Vancouver Millionaires	St-Cup	—	—	—	—	—	5	0	1	1	0
1921–22	Vancouver Millionaires	PCHA	24	14	12	26	20	2	0	0	0	0
1921–22	Vancouver Millionaires	West-PO	—	—	—	—	—	2	0	0	0	0
1921–22	Vancouver Millionaires	St-Cup	—	—	—	—	—	5	1	0	1	6
1922–23	Vancouver Maroons	PCHA	30	28	12	40	38	2	2	0	2	12
1922–23	Vancouver Millionaires	St-Cup	—	—	—	—	—	4	1	0	1	4
1923–24	Vancouver Maroons	PCHA	28	21	4	25	2	2	1	0	1	0
1923–24	Vancouver Maroons	West-PO	—	—	—	—	—	3	2	0	2	2
1923–24	Vancouver Maroons	St-Cup	—	—	—	—	—	2	0	0	0	0
1924–25	Vancouver Maroons	WCHL	28	27	6	33	17	—	—	—	—	—
1925–26	Vancouver Maroons	WHL	27	12	4	16	24	—	—	—	—	—
1926–27	Chicago Black Hawks	NHL	34	14	8	22	23	2	0	0	0	0
1927–28	Chicago Black Hawks	NHL	36	17	4	21	23	—	—	—	—	—
1928–29	Pittsburgh Pirates	NHL	10	1	0	1	2	—	—	—	—	—
1928–29	Boston Bruins	NHL	30	8	2	10	18	3	0	0	0	2
1929–30	Boston Bruins	NHL	37	4	5	9	13	6	0	0	0	4
PCHA totals			192	159	82	241	193	13	7	4	11	14
WCHL totals			55	39	10	49	41	—	—	—	—	—
St-Cup totals			—	—	—	—	—	24	11	8	19	31
NHL totals			147	44	19	63	79	11	0	0	0	6
