= 1923–24 PCHA season =

Professional ice hockey league season

- League: Pacific Coast Hockey Association
- Sport: Ice hockey
- Duration: November 26, 1923–February 25, 1924
- Number of teams: 3

Regular season
- League leader: Seattle Metropolitans
- Top scorer: Art Duncan (Vancouver)

Playoffs
- Champions: Vancouver Maroons
- Runners-up: Seattle Metropolitans

PCHA seasons
- ← 1922–23

The 1923–24 PCHA season was the 13th and last season of the professional men's ice hockey Pacific Coast Hockey Association league. Season play ran from November 26, 1923, until February 25, 1924. Each team played 30 games, including eight games against Western Canada Hockey League (WCHL) teams. The Seattle Metropolitans club were the regular-season PCHA champions, but lost the play-off against the Vancouver Maroons.

== League business ==
The league approved a rule limiting goalkeeper pads to 12 inches (300 mm) in width. The league also banned goalkeepers from going behind their own net.

== Teams ==
1923–24 Pacific Coast Hockey Association
Team	City	Arena	Capacity
Seattle Metropolitans	Seattle, Washington	Seattle Ice Arena	4,000
Vancouver Maroons	Vancouver, British Columbia	Denman Arena	10,500
Victoria Cougars	Victoria, British Columbia	Patrick Arena	4,000

=== Map of teams ===
PCHA Teams

== Regular season ==
=== Final standings ===
Note: W = Wins, L = Losses, T = Ties, GF= Goals For, GA = Goals against
Teams that qualified for the playoffs are highlighted in bold

Pacific Coast Hockey Association	GP	W	L	T	GF	GA
**Seattle Metropolitans**	30	14	16	0	84	99
**Vancouver Maroons**	30	13	16	1	87	80
Victoria Cougars	30	11	18	1	78	103

Standings include results of games played against WCHL opponents.

== Playoffs ==
The Maroons won the two-game total-goals series against Seattle (4–3).

The Maroons then played against the Western Canada Hockey League champion Calgary Tigers for the right to go directly to the Stanley Cup Finals. Calgary won the series two games to one. Vancouver then played the Montreal Canadiens in a semifinal and lost the best-of-three series two games to none.

== Schedule and results ==
Month	Day	Visitor	Score	Home	Score
November	12	Seattle	3	Vancouver	2
November	14	Victoria	6	Seattle	7 (OT 1'42")
November	16	Vancouver	1	Victoria	5
November	19	Victoria	1	Vancouver	7
November	21	Vancouver	1	Seattle	3
November	23	Seattle	2	Victoria	4
November	26	Saskatoon	4	Vancouver	7
November	30	Saskatoon	1	Victoria	7
December	3	Saskatoon	2	Vancouver	2 (OT 20')
December	5	Calgary	7	Seattle	5
December	7	Calgary	3	Victoria	1
December	10	Seattle	2	Regina	3
December	10	Victoria	3	Edmonton	1
December	10	Vancouver	3	Calgary	1
December	12	Seattle	1	Regina	4 (at Winnipeg)
December	12	Victoria	3	Saskatoon	9
December	14	Vancouver	0	Calgary	1
December	14	Victoria	2	Regina	4
December	14	Saskatoon	2	Seattle	1 (at Moose Jaw)
December	17	Vancouver	2	Edmonton	3
December	17	Victoria	1	Regina	4 (at Winnipeg)
December	17	Seattle	1	Saskatoon	2
December	19	Seattle	4	Edmonton	5 (OT 6')
December	19	Vancouver	1	Saskatoon	4
December	21	Vancouver	4	Regina	3
December	21	Victoria	3	Saskatoon	2 (OT 1') (at Winnipeg)
December	21	Seattle	1	Calgary	3
December	25	Victoria	1	Vancouver	3
December	26	Vancouver	5	Seattle	2
December	28	Vancouver	2	Victoria	3 (3:16OT)
January	1	Seattle	4	Vancouver	2
January	2	Victoria	1	Seattle	2
January	4	Seattle	2	Victoria	3 (OT 15'32")
January	7	Edmonton	1	Vancouver	4
January	9	Edmonton	1	Seattle	4
January	11	Edmonton	4	Victoria	2
January	14	Victoria	4	Vancouver	3 (OT 0'26")
January	16	Calgary	2	Seattle	3
January	18	Calgary	7	Victoria	3
January	21	Seattle	1	Regina	9
January	21	Calgary	4	Vancouver	3
January	23	Vancouver	4	Victoria	3 (OT 1'44") (at Seattle)
January	23	Seattle	3	Saskatoon	8
January	25	Vancouver	1	Victoria	2 (OT 0'25")
January	25	Seattle	3	Edmonton	2
January	28	Regina	5	Vancouver	4 (OT 7'36")
January	28	Seattle	4	Calgary	5
January	30	Regina	1	Seattle	2
February	1	Regina	2	Victoria	1
February	4	Regina	4	Vancouver	6
February	6	Seattle	4	Vancouver	2
February	7	Vancouver	2	Regina	3
February	8	Seattle	4	Victoria	1
February	9	Vancouver	3	Saskatoon	4
February	11	Victoria	4	Seattle	1 (at Vancouver)
February	11	Vancouver	3	Edmonton	1
February	13	Vancouver	2	Calgary	1 (OT 1'52")
February	14	Edmonton	7	Seattle	1
February	15	Edmonton	2	Victoria	5
February	18	Victoria	3	Calgary	4
February	20	Vancouver	0	Seattle	3
February	20	Victoria	1	Regina	2
February	22	Seattle	4	Vancouver	2 (at Victoria)
February	22	Victoria	3	Saskatoon	4
February	25	Seattle	0	Vancouver	6
February	25	Victoria	1	Edmonton	1 (OT 20')
February	27	Victoria	1	Calgary	7

Source: Coleman(1966)

== Player statistics ==
=== Scoring leaders ===
Player	Team	GP	G	A	Pts	PIM
Art Duncan	Vancouver Maroons	30	21	10	31	44
Frank Fredrickson	Victoria Cougars	30	19	8	27	28
Mickey MacKay	Vancouver Maroons	28	21	4	25	2
Jack Walker	Seattle Metropolitans	29	18	5	23	0
Frank Foyston	Seattle Metropolitans	30	17	6	23	8
Frank Boucher	Vancouver Maroons	28	15	5	20	10
Gord Fraser	Seattle Metropolitans	30	14	5	19	64
Smokey Harris	Seattle Metropolitans	30	8	10	18	30
Gizzy Hart	Victoria Cougars	29	15	1	16	10
Clem Loughlin	Victoria Cougars	30	10	7	17	26

=== Goaltending averages ===
Name	Club	GP	GA	SO	GAA
Hugh Lehman	Vancouver	30	80	1	2.7
Hap Holmes	Seattle	30	99	2	3.3
Hec Fowler	Victoria	30	103		3.4

== See also ==
- Pacific Coast Hockey Association
- 1923–24 NHL season
- 1923–24 WCHL season
