= Wally Elmer =

Canadian ice hockey player

- Born: January 1, 1898 Kingston, Ontario, Canada
- Died: August 28, 1978 (aged 80)
- Position: Forward
- Played for: Saskatoon Crescents; Saskatoon Sheiks; Victoria Cougars
- Playing career: 1922–1929

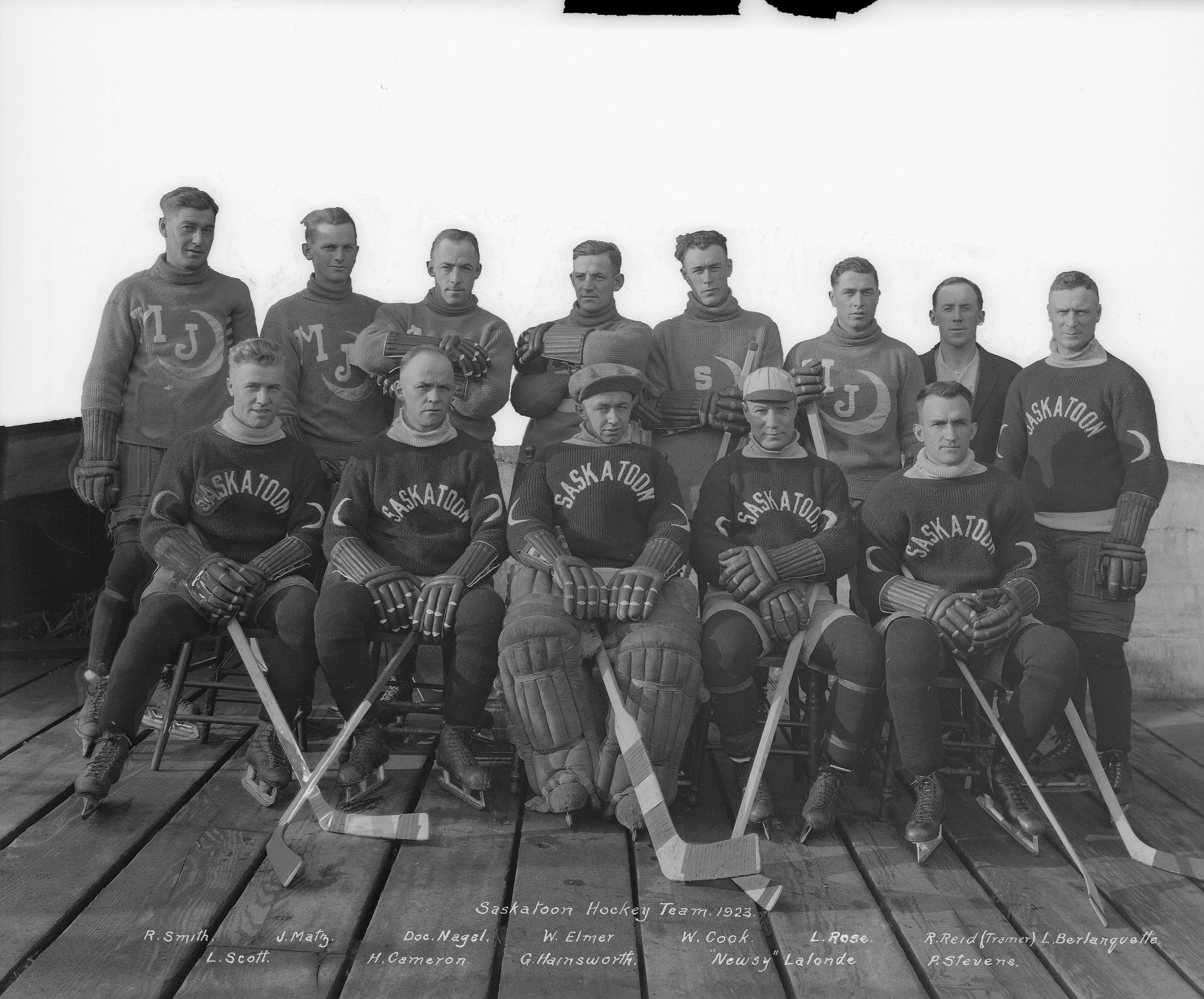
Elmer, standing fourth from left, with the Saskatoon Sheiks/Crescents in 1923–24.

Wallace Druce Elmer (January 1, 1898 – August 28, 1978) was a professional ice hockey player who played in the Western Canada Hockey League. He played with the Saskatoon Crescents/Sheiks and Victoria Cougars. He won the Stanley Cup with the Cougars in 1925.
