= Denman Arena =

Indoor arena in Vancouver, British Columbia

Coordinates: 49°17′35″N 123°8′0″W

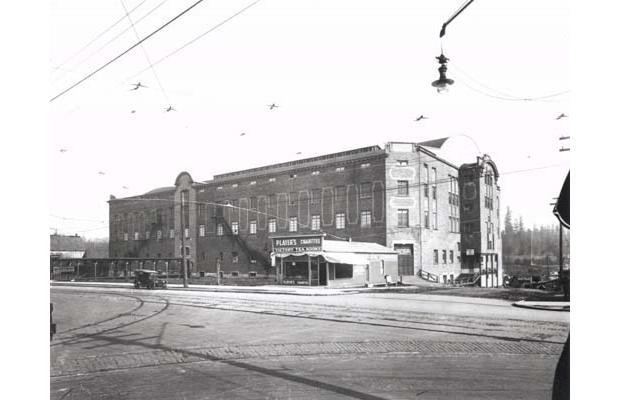
- Photograph of Denman Arena in 1913
- Interactive map of Denman Arena
- Location: Georgia Street at Denman Street, Vancouver, British Columbia, Canada
- Owner: Vancouver Arena Company Limited
- Capacity: 10,500
- Surface: mechanically frozen ice
- Field size: 64 m × 26 m (210 ft × 85 ft) (surface)

Construction
- Opened: December 26, 1911
- Demolished: 1936
- Cost: $226,382

Tenants
- Vancouver Millionaires (PCHA) (1911–1926); New Westminster Royals (PCHA) (1911–1914); Vancouver Lions (PCHL, NWHL) (1928–1936)

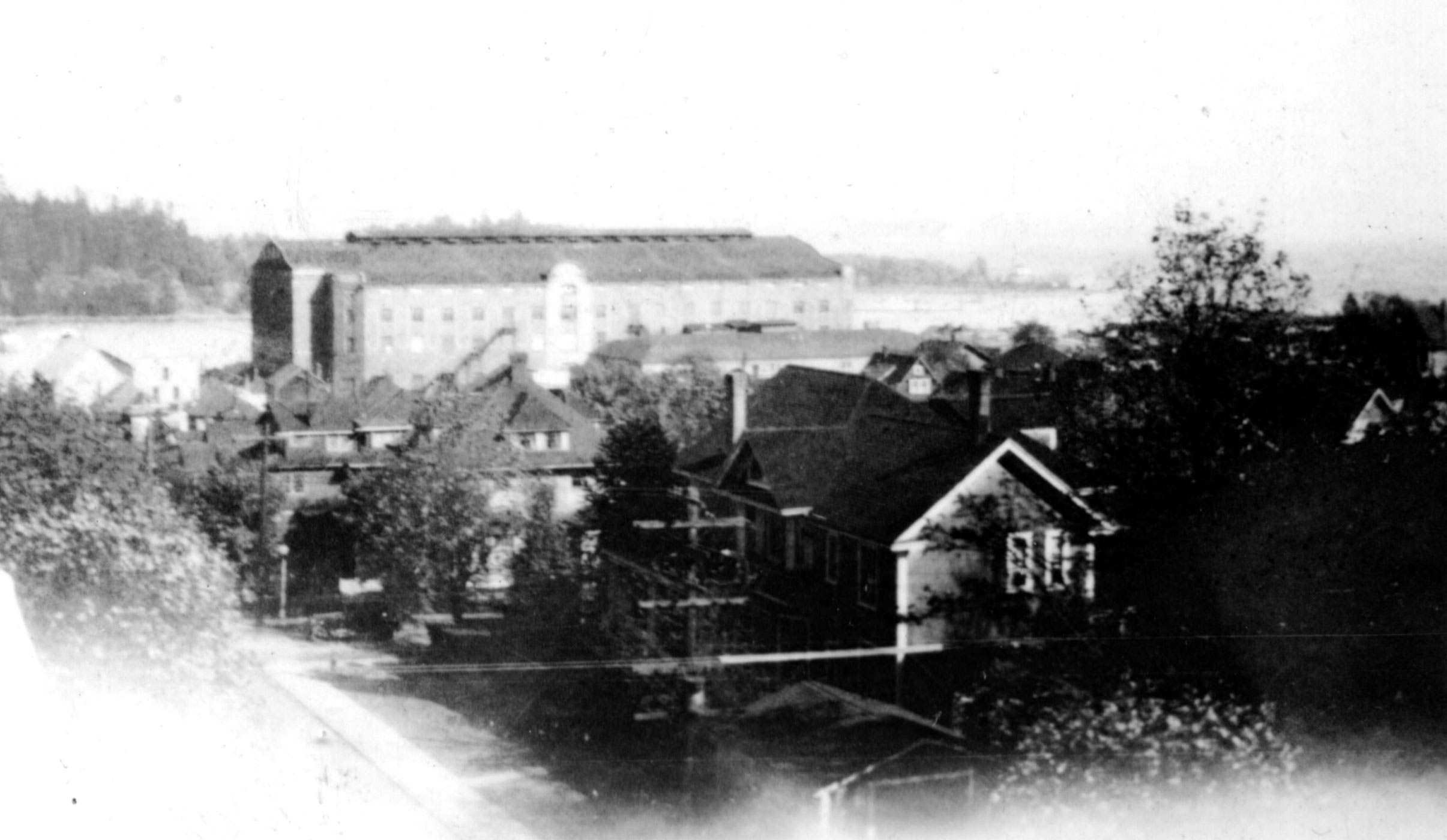
Denman Arena from the southwest

Denman Arena was an indoor arena located in the West End neighbourhood of Vancouver, British Columbia. The arena was located at 1805 West Georgia Street at the northwest corner with Denman Street. It opened in December 1911 and was destroyed by fire in 1936. Its primary use was for ice sports such as ice hockey. It was the home ice rink of the Vancouver Millionaires professional ice hockey team, and was the location of the 1915 Stanley Cup Final when the Millionaires swept the Ottawa Senators in three games of a five game series, along with later Stanley Cup Final.

The arena was also used for other sports, musical performances, and public assemblies. It was an assembly point for Canadian servicemen during World War I. The 10,500-seat arena was the largest in Canada at the time, and introduced mechanically frozen or "artificial" ice to Canada.

== Construction ==
In January 1911, Joe Patrick sold his Nelson, British Columbia lumber business for $440,000. The Patrick family moved to Victoria and the decision was made to use the proceeds of the company sale to go into the business of professional ice hockey. The family built the Denman Arena to support the new Pacific Coast Hockey Association professional ice hockey league, to be run by Joe's sons Frank and Lester Patrick. Both Frank and Lester were professional ice hockey players and had played in the National Hockey Association and other early professional leagues in Eastern Canada. Simultaneously, the Patricks also built the 4000-seat Patrick Arena in Victoria.

To build the Vancouver arena, the Patricks bought a parcel of land consisting of thirteen lots from the water's edge of Coal Harbour to Georgia Street, bounded by Denman and Chilco Streets. The location was near Stanley Park to the west, and was connected to the downtown business district by a streetcar line along Georgia Street. The site was previously the location of the Kanaka Ranch, which was settled in the 1860s by Hawaiian families, who grew fruit and vegetables, and produced charcoal, on the site.

To finance the construction of the Arena, the Patricks formed the Vancouver Arena Company Limited, capitalized at $200,000. The company was divided into 1000 preferred shares and 1000 common shares, with a 10% annual dividend. The company issued an initial share offering, but by September 1911, the offering had only raised $1400. Two more investors signed on, but it was up to the Patricks to take the rest. To facilitate the playing of ice hockey in Vancouver's moderate climate, the Patricks imported mechanical ice freezing equipment that Frank and Lester Patrick had seen in operation at New York's St. Nicholas Arena. The Denman Arena opened on December 20, 1911, attracting 1500 people for a session of public ice skating. Denman Arena held 10,500 people, making it at the time, the largest indoor arena in Canada, one of the world's largest indoor arenas, and the second largest indoor arena in North America, after the second Madison Square Garden in New York City. The Arena was built at a cost of $226,382.

In 1927, the Patricks built the 2,500 seat Denman Auditorium next to the Arena. The Auditorium, which was multi-purpose, survived the fire of 1936 and was renovated in 1952. It re-opened on September 10, 1952, as the Georgia Auditorium concert hall. It only lasted seven years before it was demolished in 1959, after the construction of the Queen Elizabeth Theatre.

== Usage ==
The Arena was the permanent home of the professional Vancouver Millionaires of the Pacific Coast Hockey Association. The Arena was also the home of the New Westminster Royals from 1911 until 1914. The Patricks had hoped to set up teams in Calgary and Edmonton in the PCHA for the opening season, but the plans fell through. To avoid having a two-team league, the Patricks formed the Royals, to represent the neighbouring town of New Westminster and encourage fans to come to the Arena. Although the Royals were an unexpected necessity, the Royals were the winners of the first PCHA championship. The Royals were disbanded in 1914, when the PCHA formed a team in Portland, Oregon. The Millionaires were later renamed the Maroons and were disbanded in 1926 when the Western Canada Hockey League discontinued operations.

The Arena hosted the Stanley Cup "World Series" championship series four times. The 1915 series pitted the Millionaires versus the National Hockey Association's Ottawa Senators, the first Stanley Cup series held west of Winnipeg. The series was won by the Millionaires, and remains the only Stanley Cup won by a Vancouver team. The Arena also hosted Stanley Cup series in 1921 (Ottawa besting the Millionaires), 1923 (Ottawa over the Edmonton Eskimos), and game two of the 1925 series (Victoria Cougars over the NHL's Montreal Canadiens).

During construction, the Patricks organized a four-team amateur ice hockey league, the Vancouver Amateur Hockey League, composed of the Vancouver Athletic Club, the Bankers, the Columbians and the Vancouver Rowing Club. In 1921, the Arena hosted the first international women's championship of ice hockey, organized by the PCHA. After the collapse of the Western Canada league, a new Pacific Coast Hockey League was organized, with the Vancouver Lions playing out of the Arena. The PCHL lasted three years. In 1933, the Lions were revived in the North West Hockey League. The Lions continued after the destruction of the Arena, and a reconstituted PCHL began operations with the Lions as a member.

Two other ice sports clubs had their start at the Denman Arena. The Arena also had four curling rinks in the basement and the Vancouver Curling Club was established in December 1911. Curling was discontinued during World War I to make way for the armed forces. The Club re-organized in 1931 at the Pacific National Exhibition's Forum. The Club built its own facility in 1949. The Connaught Skating Club also was established in December 1911, and celebrated its 100th anniversary in 2011. During the 1920s, the Club held competitions and an annual "Carnival" show at the Arena. After the Arena burned down, Connaught moved to the Forum as well, and in 1965 moved to Richmond, British Columbia to Richmond's Minoru Arena.

The Arena and Auditorium were also used for boxing and wrestling matches. The North Shore Indians of the Inter-City League played box lacrosse in the Arena in the 1930s.

In 1914, the Arena was used to house over 1,000 soldiers who were assembling to form the 23rd Infantry Brigade. The soldiers left Vancouver in August 1914 to be deployed as the first Canadian troops in World War I.

On October 21, 1924, the Arena was the site of a political radio broadcast by Canadian Prime Minister William Lyon Mackenzie King, who spoke at Denman Arena during a tour of the west. It may have been the first political broadcast in Canada. Later that year, the telephone line installed was used for the first radio broadcast of an ice hockey game in British Columbia.

On April 28, 1935, over 16,000 assembled at the Arena for a political rally by the CCF, the largest indoor gathering in Vancouver up until that time.

The Denman Auditorium was taken over during World War II by the Canadian navy, then used as storage by Boeing Aircraft. It was bought in 1945 by H. M. Singer, who converted it back to a venue. Two notable rock and roll concerts took place in 1957, by a touring group of musicians known as "The Biggest Show of Stars." The lineup included Paul Anka, Chuck Berry, Eddie Cochran, Fats Domino, The Drifters, The Everly Brothers, Buddy Holly, Buddy Knox and others. The Vancouver Symphony Orchestra regularly played at the venue during the 1950s. The final event at the Georgia Auditorium took place on June 19, 1959. It was a free show by the CBC Talent Caravan.

Other musical performances at the Arena and Auditorium included performances by Maurice Ravel, Dizzy Gillespie, Glenn Gould, Charlie Parker, Oscar Peterson, Ella Fitzgerald, Jeanette MacDonald, Margaret Truman and others.

== Destruction by fire ==
The Arena was built of wood in 1911. Not long before 1936, the Arena was clad in brick to reduce its risk of burning due to fire. On the night of August 19, 1936, 4,000 fans had attended a boxing match by Max Baer. By 1:30 AM that night, a fire had broken out in the adjacent Coal Harbour area. Despite the recently added brick veneer, the fire spread to inside the Arena. The interior exploded into flame and the Arena could not be saved by Vancouver firemen. Stan Patrick, the youngest brother of Frank and Lester Patrick, and manager of the auditorium, attended the fire and was quoted as saying "You think this is a good fire? You should have seen the one in Victoria. That was a pip!" A lack of wind prevented the huge fire from spreading into downtown Vancouver. The overall damage of the fire was estimated at $500,000. Two persons were killed and three firemen injured. The Arena was destroyed, along with seven industrial buildings, two homes and fifty-eight small boats. The concrete floor of the Arena was not destroyed, and it was adapted into an outdoor dance floor named the Starlight.

In 1945, the site of the arena was sold by Lester Patrick to Vancouver theatre owner H. M. Singer for $80,000. Singer planned to build a $1 million sports arena on the site, but the arena was never built. Singer managed the Auditorium as a concert venue until 1959.

== Site today ==
The site today is now part of Devonian Harbour Park. A historical marker has been placed at the foot of Denman Street, with information about the Arena, the Georgia Auditorium and Coal Harbour.
