= 1925 Stanley Cup Final =

1925 ice hockey championship series

	1	2	3	4	Total
Victoria Cougars (WCHL)	5	3	2	6	3
Montreal Canadiens (NHL)	2	1	4	1	1
- Location(s): Victoria: Patrick Arena (1, 3, 4); Vancouver: Denman Arena (2)
- Format: best-of-five
- Coaches: Montreal: Leo Dandurand; Victoria: Lester Patrick
- Captains: Montreal: Sprague Cleghorn; Victoria: Clem Loughlin
- Dates: March 21–30, 1925
- Series-winning goal: Gizzy Hart (1:35, second)
- Hall of Famers: Cougars: Frank Foyston (1958); Frank Fredrickson (1958); Hap Holmes (1972); Jack Walker (1960); Canadiens: Sprague Cleghorn (1958); Aurele Joliat (1947); Sylvio Mantha (1960); Howie Morenz (1945); Georges Vezina (1945); Coaches: Leo Dandurand (1963); Lester Patrick (1947, player)

The 1925 Stanley Cup Final saw the Western Canada Hockey League (WCHL) champion Victoria Cougars defeat the National Hockey League (NHL) champion Montreal Canadiens three games to one in a best-of-five game series. The Canadiens were substitute NHL representatives, as the final series to decide the NHL champion was not played.

The Cougars were the last non-NHL team to win the Cup as the WCHL (renamed the Western Hockey League for the 1925–26 season) folded after 1926, leaving the Stanley Cup to become the NHL's de facto championship trophy. The Cougars would also be the last team based west of Chicago to win the Cup until the Edmonton Oilers won the trophy in 1984. These were also the last Stanley Cup Final games to be played in Western Canada until the Vancouver Canucks qualified for the 1982 Final. Games one, three, and four were held in Victoria. Game two, held in Vancouver, was the last neutral site game in Stanley Cup Final history that did not involve the New York Rangers until the 2020 Stanley Cup Final.

== Path to the Final ==
Prior to the season, the Pacific Coast Hockey Association (PCHA) folded and two of its teams, the Cougars and the Vancouver Maroons joined the WCHL. Victoria finished the 1924–25 WCHL regular season in third place, but eventually upset the Calgary Tigers in the two-game total goals WCHL championship series by a combined score of 3–1.

Meanwhile, the Canadiens also finished the NHL regular season in third place. In the NHL playoffs, Montreal went on to beat the second place Toronto St. Patricks, 5–2, in a two-game total goals series. The winner of that series was to go on and play the first place Hamilton Tigers. However, the Tigers were suspended after Hamilton players staged a strike in an attempt to receive more compensation because the league extended the regular season from 24 to 30 games. As a result, the Canadiens were declared the 1924–25 NHL champions.

== Game summaries ==
With the demise of the PCHA, the Stanley Cup playoffs reverted to a single best-of-five series to determine the champion. However, the Cup Finals still annually rotated between the east and the west, and thus all of the games in the 1925 Finals were played on the West Coast. Games one, three, and four were played at the 4,200 seat Patrick Arena in Victoria; game two was played at the Denman Arena in Vancouver. The decision to use the larger Denman Arena (10,500 seats) for game two was based on the huge demand for tickets. The Cougars jumped to a two games to none series lead with 5–2 and 3–1 victories, but the Canadiens won game three, 4–2. In game four, Gizzy Hart scored the game-winning goal in Victoria's 6–1 win to clinch the Cup.

Cougars goaltender Hap Holmes recorded a 2.00 goal-against average for the series. Jack Walker led Victoria in goals with four, while Frank Fredrickson scored three. Overall, eight different player combining for the Cougars' 16 goals.

March 21	Montreal Canadiens	2–5	Victoria Cougars	Patrick Arena	Recap
No scoring		First period	3:50 - Jack Walker (1); 11:55 - Haldor Halderson (1)
No scoring		Second period	3:22 - Jack Walker (2)
Billy Coutu (1) - 13:38; Howie Morenz (4) - 19:06		Third period	3:22 - Gord Fraser (1); 14:06 - Gord Fraser (2)
Georges Vezina		Goalie stats	Hap Holmes

March 23	Montreal Canadiens	1–3	Victoria Cougars	Denman Arena	Recap
No scoring		First period	8:15 - Jack Walker (3); 15:40 - Frank Fredrickson (1)
Aurele Joliat (1) - 1:18		Second period	No scoring
No scoring		Third period	8:52 - Jack Walker (4)
Georges Vezina		Goalie stats	Hap Holmes

March 27	Montreal Canadiens	4–2	Victoria Cougars	Patrick Arena	Recap
Howie Morenz (5) - 4:32		First period	9:00 - Jocko Anderson (1)
No scoring		Second period	No scoring
Aurele Joliat (2) - 5:50; Howie Morenz (6) - 7:30; Howie Morenz (7) - 18:52		Third period	1:49 - Gizzy Hart (1)
Georges Vezina		Goalie stats	Hap Holmes

March 30	Montreal Canadiens	1–6	Victoria Cougars	Patrick Arena	Recap
No scoring		First period	5:05 - Frank Fredrickson (2)
Billy Boucher (2) - 11:38		Second period	1:35 - Gizzy Hart (2); 16:25 - Haldor Halderson (2); 00:00 - Frank Foyston (1)
No scoring		Third period	7:05 - Frank Fredrickson (3); 16:31 - Clem Loughlin (1)
Georges Vezina		Goalie stats	Hap Holmes

Victoria won series 3–1

== Stanley Cup engraving ==
The 1925 Stanley Cup was presented to Cougars captain Clem Loughlin by the trophy's trustee William Foran, following the Cougars 6–1 win over the Canadiens in game four.

The following Cougars players and staff had their names engraved on the Stanley Cup

1924–25 Victoria Cougars

=== Players ===
Centres

- 3 John Jocko Anderson

Wingers

- 10 Frank Fredrickson
- 4 Frank Foyston
- 6 Wally Elmer
- 5 Harold Gizzy Hart
- 8 Harry Meeking
- 7 Jack Walker

Defencemen

- 2 Clem Loughlin (Captain)
- 9 Gord Fraser
- 11 "Slim" Haldor Halderson

Goaltenders

- 1 Harry Hap Holmes

=== Coaching and administrative staff ===
- Lester Patrick (Owner-President/Manager-Coach)
- Larry Brunnell (Trainer)&

&-name is missing from the Stanley Cup.

=== Stanley Cup engraving ===
- After the series win, a new angled ring with the words "Won/By/'Cougars' Victoria, B.C. 1925" was added between the original bowl of the Cup and the original first ring of the base. All players and the manager were included on the new ring, but trainer Larry Brunnell was left off.
- Victoria players Frank Fredrickson and Haldor Halderson became the first players to win both an Olympic gold medal and the Stanley Cup. Fredrickson and Halderson had been members of the Winnipeg Falcons who won gold at the 1920 Olympic Games.

== See also ==
- 1924–25 NHL season
- 1924–25 WCHL season

Preceded by Montreal Canadiens; 1924	Victoria Cougars; Stanley Cup champions 1925	Succeeded by Montreal Maroons; 1926
