= 1920–21 PCHA season =

Professional ice hockey league season

- League: Pacific Coast Hockey Association
- Sport: Ice hockey
- Duration: December 20, 1920–March 11, 1921
- Teams: 3

Regular season
- League leader: Vancouver Millionaires
- Top scorer: Frank Fredrickson (Victoria)

Playoffs
- Champions: Vancouver Millionaires
- Runners-up: Seattle Metropolitans

PCHA seasons
- ← 1919–20 1921–22 →

The 1920–21 PCHA season was the tenth season of the Pacific Coast Hockey Association. Three teams played 24 games each. The Vancouver Millionaires won the league championship, but lost the Stanley Cup to the Ottawa Senators of the National Hockey League.

== Teams ==
1920–21 Pacific Coast Hockey Association
Team	City	Arena	Capacity
Seattle Metropolitans	Seattle, Washington	Seattle Ice Arena	4,000
Vancouver Millionaires	Vancouver, British Columbia	Denman Arena	10,500
Victoria Aristocrats	Victoria, British Columbia	Patrick Arena	4,000

=== Map of teams ===
PCHA Teams

== Regular season ==
The Aristocrats signed Frank Fredrickson who had starred in the Olympics. He scored for Victoria in his first game. Mickey MacKay returned to play after a year's layoff with a broken jaw. Bernie Morris returned to regular-season play after missing the previous season due to his arrest in the United States for alleged draft dodging. Morris spent nearly a year at Alcatraz before he was freed.

On March 4, a special "Moose Johnson Night" was held to honour Moose Johnson who had played ten years in the league. Presentations to Johnson were made before the game. The game itself went to sixty minutes of overtime before the teams agreed to leave the score a draw.

Cyclone Taylor scored the final goals of his career in the final game on March 11. He scored a hat-trick in an 8–11 loss to Victoria.

=== Final standings ===
GP = Games Played, W = Wins, L = Losses, T = Ties, Pts = Points, GF = Goals For, GA = Goals against
Teams that qualified for the playoffs are highlighted in bold

Team	GP	W	L	T	Pts	GF	GA
**Vancouver Millionaires**	24	13	11	0	26	86	79
**Seattle Metropolitans**	24	12	11	1	25	77	68
Victoria Aristocrats	24	10	13	1	21	72	88

Source: Coleman(1966)

== Playoffs ==
=== PCHA Championship ===
Vancouver defeated Seattle in a two-game total-goal series 7–0, 6–2 (13–2) to win the league championship and advance to the Stanley Cup series.

Date	Home	Score	Away	Score
March 14	Vancouver	7	Seattle	0
March 16	Seattle	2	Vancouver	6

=== Stanley Cup Championship ===
The Stanley Cup finals took place in Vancouver, British Columbia between the Millionaires and Ottawa Senators of the National Hockey League, alternating between PCHA and NHL rules. Ottawa won the series 3–2. The attendance per game during the series averaged 10,000 people which was a record for its time. It was an extremely hard fought and close series as all games were decided by only one goal.

== Schedule and results ==
Month	Day	Visitor	Score	Home	Score
Dec	20	Seattle	0	Vancouver	2
Dec	22	Victoria	2	Seattle	7
Dec	25	Seattle	4	Victoria	3 (OT 6'42")
Dec	27	Victoria	3	Vancouver	6
Dec	29	Vancouver	2	Seattle	3 (OT 7'50")
Jan	1	Vancouver	3	Victoria	5
Jan	3	Seattle	2	Vancouver	3
Jan	5	Victoria	1	Seattle	2 (OT 3'35")
Jan	7	Seattle	0	Victoria	2
Jan	10	Victoria	3	Vancouver	5
Jan	12	Vancouver	3	Seattle	4 (OT 1'46")
Jan	14	Vancouver	4	Victoria	3
Jan	17	Seattle	3	Vancouver	7
Jan	19	Victoria	2	Seattle	9
Jan	21	Vancouver	1	Victoria	4
Jan	24	Victoria	2	Vancouver	5
Jan	26	Vancouver	2	Seattle	3
Jan	28	Seattle	3	Victoria	5
Jan	31	Seattle	4	Vancouver	3
Feb	2	Victoria	3	Seattle	2 (OT 31'14")
Feb	4	Vancouver	4	Victoria	3
Feb	7	Victoria	2	Vancouver	5
Feb	9	Vancouver	2	Seattle	6
Feb	11	Seattle	1	Victoria	3
Feb	14	Seattle	1	Vancouver	2
Feb	16	Victoria	4	Seattle	3
Feb	18	Vancouver	2	Victoria	0
Feb	21	Victoria	1	Vancouver	5
Feb	23	Vancouver	1	Seattle	5
Feb	25	Seattle	0	Victoria	3
Feb	28	Seattle	7	Vancouver	4
Mar	2	Victoria	3	Seattle	0
Mar	4	Seattle	4	Victoria	4 (OT 60')
Mar	7	Victoria	0	Vancouver	5
Mar	9	Vancouver	2	Seattle	4
Mar	11	Vancouver	8	Victoria	11

Source: Coleman(1966).

== Player statistics ==
=== Scoring leaders ===
Player	Team	GP	G	A	Pts	PIM
Frank Fredrickson	Victoria Aristocrats	21	20	12	32	3
Smokey Harris	Vancouver Millionaires	24	15	17	32	6
Frank Foyston	Seattle Metropolitans	23	26	4	30	10
Jack Adams	Vancouver Millionaires	24	17	13	30	60
Jim Riley	Seattle Metropolitans	24	23	5	28	20
Alf Skinner	Vancouver Millionaires	24	20	4	24	22
Bernie Morris	Seattle Metropolitans	24	11	13	24	3
Lloyd Cook	Vancouver Millionaires	24	12	9	21	18
Tommy Dunderdale	Victoria Aristocrats	24	9	11	20	18
Mickey MacKay	Vancouver Millionaires	21	10	8	18	15

=== Goaltending averages ===
GP = Games played; GA = Goals allowed; SO=Shutouts; GAA=Goals against average

Name	Club	GP	GA	SO	GAA
Hap Holmes	Seattle	24	68	0	2.8
Hugh Lehman	Vancouver	24	78	3	3.3
Norman Fowler	Victoria	24	88	3	3.7

Source: Coleman(1966)

== See also ==
- List of Stanley Cup champions
- 1920 in sports
- 1921 in sports
