= Frank Fredrickson =

Icelandic-Canadian ice hockey player (1895–1979)

- Hockey Hall of Fame, 1958
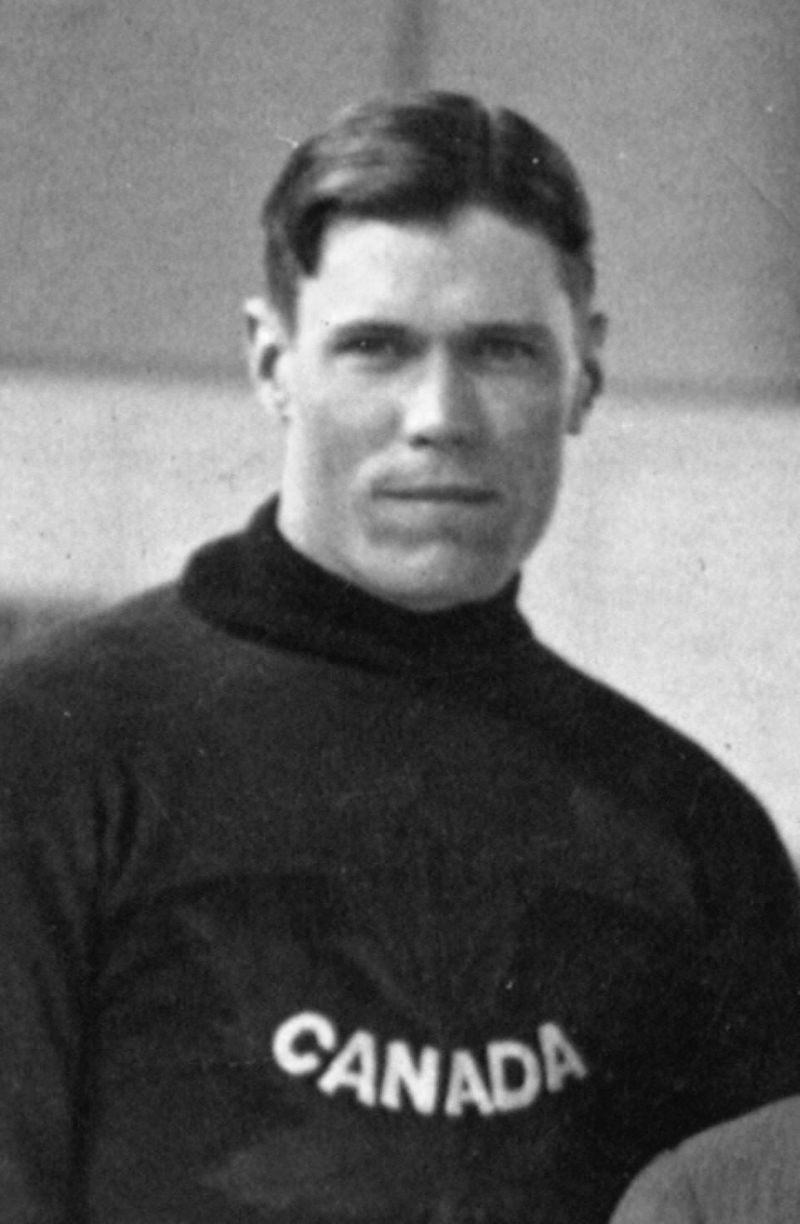
- Frank Fredrickson representing Canada at the 1920 Summer Olympics.
- Born: June 3, 1895 Winnipeg, Manitoba, Canada
- Died: May 28, 1979 (aged 83) Toronto, Ontario, Canada
- Height: 5 ft 11 in (180 cm)
- Weight: 180 lb (82 kg; 12 st 12 lb)
- Position: Centre
- Shot: Left
- Played for: Victoria Aristocrats; Victoria Cougars; Detroit Falcons; Boston Bruins; Pittsburgh Pirates
- National team: Canada
- Playing career: 1913–1932
Medal record
Men's Ice hockey
Representing Canada
Gold medal – first place	1920 Antwerp	Team competition

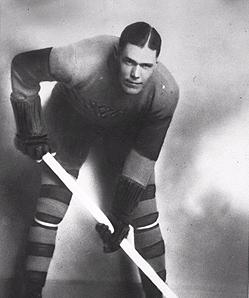
Fredrickson with the Victoria Cougars.

Sigurdur Franklin Fredrickson (born Sigurður Franklín Friðriksson; June 3, 1895 – May 28, 1979) was an Icelandic-Canadian ice hockey player and aviator. As a player and coach, he was slightly important to both the amateur and professional ice hockey as it evolved in North America in the early 20th century. Fredrickson's career was interrupted by military service during the First World War and prematurely ended by a knee injury in 1931.

Fredrickson was the center for the Winnipeg Falcons, the Canadian team which won the Olympic gold medal in 1920. Fredrickson then joined the Victoria Aristocrats/Victoria Cougars and helped them win the Stanley Cup in 1925. On both occasions he was a teammate of Icelandic-Canadian ice hockey star Haldor Halderson, making them the first players to win an Olympic gold medal and a Stanley Cup.

Fredrickson became one of the pioneers of flight in Iceland when he arrived there in 1920 to fly for the country's first airline, Flugfélag Íslands.

== Early life ==
Fredrickson was born in Winnipeg, Manitoba as Sigurður Franklín Friðriksson, to Icelandic immigrants Jón Vídalín Friðriksson and Guðlaug S. Sigurðardóttir. He spoke Icelandic at home, and learned English when he started school.

== Ice hockey career ==
=== Amateur career ===
Fredrickson attended Kelvin Technical Institute and Central Collegiate before enrolling at the University of Manitoba law school, where he captained the hockey team. He enlisted in the 196th Battalion in February 1916 to join the First World War, but soon transferred to the 223rd Battalion, and by May 1917 was in Europe. Prior to leaving for Europe he played for the battalion's hockey team in the Winnipeg Amateur Patriotic league, scoring 17 goals in 6 games. He transferred once again to the Royal Flying Corps, and was sent to Egypt for training. While on his way back from Egypt the ship he was on, the SS Leasowe Castle, was hit by a German torpedo and sank. Fredrickson was then posted to Scotland to serve as a trainer and test pilot, where he ended the war.

Back in Winnipeg, Frederickson captained the Winnipeg Falcons, to the 1920 Allan Cup and then to the first gold medal offered in ice hockey at the 1920 Olympics at Antwerp. Following the Olympics he moved to Iceland to work for Flugfélag Íslands, the first airliner in the country, in introducing airplanes to the local population. On 25 June 1920, he became the second man to pilot a plane in Iceland, after Cecil Faber. While in Iceland, he competed in track and field and set a new national record in discus. In October, he moved back to Canada.

=== Professional career ===
Professionally, Fredrickson played for the Victoria Cougars of the Pacific Coast Hockey Association and the Boston Bruins, Pittsburgh Pirates, and Detroit Falcons in the National Hockey League. He helped Victoria win the Stanley Cup in 1925.

Fredrickson signed a professional contract with the Victoria Aristocrats of the Pacific Coast Hockey Association (PCHA) in 1920, being offered C$2,500 for the season. However he initially hesitated, and missed the first 3 games of the regular season before joining the team; he made his debut on January 1, 1921. Fredrickson finished the season tied with Smokey Harris for the most points in the PCHA, with 32, but as Fredrickson had more goals (20 to 15), he was credited as the league's scoring champion. He finished the following season with 15 goals and 10 assists.

During the 1926–27 season Frederickson's salary was reportedly $6,000, the highest in the NHL.

On January 18, 1927, Fredrickson scored four goals in a single game for Boston in the Bruins' 7–3 victory over the New York Rangers. He became the second Bruin to achieve this feat. Teammate Harry Oliver had done it exactly one week before.

On December 21, 1928, Fredrickson was traded from the Boston Bruins to the Pittsburgh Pirates for Mickey MacKay. When the Stanley Cup was redone during the 1957–58 NHL season his name was engraved, contrary to NHL rules, on the Cup with the 1929 Bruins. Fredrickson was a member of the Pittsburgh Pirates the day Boston won the Cup. This made him ineligible to be on the cup with Boston.

Fredrickson coached hockey and lacrosse after his retirement. He coached the Pittsburgh Pirates during the 1929–1930 season, when he also played 9 games, but the team went 5-36-3 and moved to Philadelphia the next season before folding. In 1933, Fredrickson was named coach of the Princeton University ice hockey team. While at Princeton he befriended Albert Einstein, who was working as a professor there; the two shared an interest in the violin. Fredrickson was inducted into the Hockey Hall of Fame in 1958 and is also a member of the Manitoba Sports Hall of Fame and Museum.

=== Playing style ===
"... Freddie was a bit nervous at the start, and was cut across the legs by the hot Skinner, who drew a penalty. In the second period Freddie got his legs, and in the final session he was a perfect marvel. His skating, stickhandling and dazzling speed as well as his terrific shot made him a most dangerous man. Vancouver tried to box him, but he was too fast, and was continually on top of Lehman."

— Victoria Daily Times describing Fredrickson's first professional game with the Victoria Aristocrats on January 1, 1921.

Fredrickson was a centre forward and a left-hand shot.

When Fredrickson made his long-awaited professional debut in the PCHA with the Victoria Aristocrats against the Vancouver Millionaires on New Year's Day 1921 he was already 25 years old and an Allan Cup and Olympic champion, and the anticipations among the home fans in Victoria were sky high, although there were also some doubters who wondered if he could star in the PCHA circuit. Fredrickson did not let anyone down, when he was finally let on by coach Lester Patrick after 10 minutes of play, after he had shaken off his last nerves. During the last period of the game Fredrickson had one goal and two assists when Victoria turned the game around and won 5 goals to 3, with the local newspaper Victoria Daily Times hailing him as the new "Babe Ruth of hockey" and claiming that "he showed everything and lacked nothing."

=== Career statistics ===
==== Regular season and playoffs ====
			Regular season					Playoffs
Season	Team	League	GP	G	A	Pts	PIM	GP	G	A	Pts	PIM
1913–14	Winnipeg Falcons	MHL-Sr.	11	13	7	20	0	—	—	—	—	—
1914–15	Winnipeg Falcons	MHL-Sr.	8	10	5	15	0	1	1	0	1	0
1915–16	Winnipeg Falcons	MHL-Sr.	6	13	3	16	14	—	—	—	—	—
1916–17	Winnipeg 223rd Battalion	MHL-Sr.	8	17	3	20	40	—	—	—	—	—
1919–20	Winnipeg Falcons	MHL-Sr.	10	23	5	28	12	6	20	5	25	2
1920–21	Victoria Aristocrats	PCHA	21	20	12	32	3	—	—	—	—	—
1921–22	Victoria Aristocrats	PCHA	24	15	10	25	26	—	—	—	—	—
1922–23	Victoria Cougars	PCHA	30	39	16	55	26	2	2	0	2	4
1923–24	Victoria Cougars	PCHA	30	19	8	27	28	—	—	—	—	—
1924–25	Victoria Cougars	WCHL	28	22	8	30	43	4	3	1	4	2
1924–25	Victoria Cougars	St-Cup	—	—	—	—	—	4	3	2	5	6
1925–26	Victoria Cougars	WHL	30	16	8	24	89	4	2	1	3	6
1925–26	Victoria Cougars	St-Cup	—	—	—	—	—	4	1	1	2	10
1926–27	Detroit Cougars	NHL	16	4	6	10	12	—	—	—	—	—
1926–27	Boston Bruins	NHL	28	14	7	21	33	8	2	2	4	20
1927–28	Boston Bruins	NHL	41	10	4	14	83	2	0	1	1	4
1928–29	Boston Bruins	NHL	12	3	1	4	24	—	—	—	—	—
1928–29	Pittsburgh Pirates	NHL	31	3	7	10	28	—	—	—	—	—
1929–30	Pittsburgh Pirates	NHL	9	4	7	11	20	—	—	—	—	—
1930–31	Detroit Falcons	NHL	24	1	2	3	6	—	—	—	—	—
1930–31	Detroit Olympics	IHL	6	0	1	1	2	—	—	—	—	—
PCHA totals			105	93	46	139	83	2	2	0	2	4
WCHL/WHL totals			58	38	16	54	132	8	5	2	7	8
NHL totals			161	39	34	73	206	10	2	3	5	24

- All statistics taken from NHL.com

==== Coaching record ====
Team	Year	Regular season						Post season
Team	Year	G	W	L	T	Pts	Division rank	Result
Pittsburgh Pirates	1929–30	44	5	36	3	13	5th in American	Missed playoffs
Princeton University	1933–34	17	10	7	0	–	–	–
Princeton University	1934–35	16	5	11	0	–	–	–

=== Awards and achievements ===
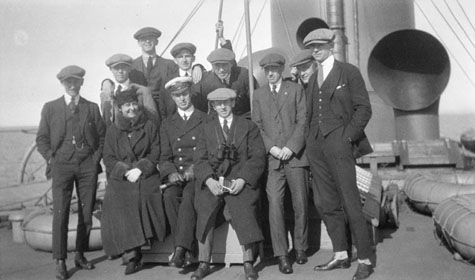
Fredrickson (far left in the back row, directly behind the lady) with the Winnipeg Falcons en route to the 1920 Olympics.

- Allan Cup championship (1920)
- Olympic gold medalist (1920)
- PCHA First All-Star Team (1921, 1922, 1923, and 1924)
- PCHA Scoring Champion (1923)
- PCHA Goals Leader (1923)
- Stanley Cup championships (1925 and 1929)
- WCHL First All-Star Team (1926)
- Inducted into the Hockey Hall of Fame in 1958
- Selected to Manitoba's All-Century Second All-Star Team
- Inducted into the Manitoba Sports Hall of Fame and Museum in 1981
- Honoured Member of the Manitoba Hockey Hall of Fame

== Personal life ==
Fredrickson was married to Beatrice Stefánsdóttir who was also of Icelandic-Canadian descent.

== Bibliography ==
- Sigurdur Franklin "Frank" Fredrickson at Manitoba Historical Society
- Hockey Hall of Fame (2003). Honoured Members: Hockey Hall of Fame. Bolton, Ontario: Fenn Publishing. ISBN 1-55168-239-7.
- MacLeod, Alan Livingstone (2021), Capitals, Aristocrats, and Cougars: Victoria's Hockey Professionals, 1911–1926, Victoria: Heritage House, ISBN 978-1-77203-373-1
- MacLeod, Alan Livingstone (2018), From Rinks to Regiments: Hockey Hall-of-Famers and the Great War, Victoria, British Columbia: Heritage House, ISBN 978-1-77203-268-0

Preceded by Odie Cleghorn	Head coach of the Pittsburgh Pirates; 1929–30	Succeeded by Philadelphia Quakers coaches Cooper Smeaton
