= E. L. Richardson (sports executive) =

Canadian businessman

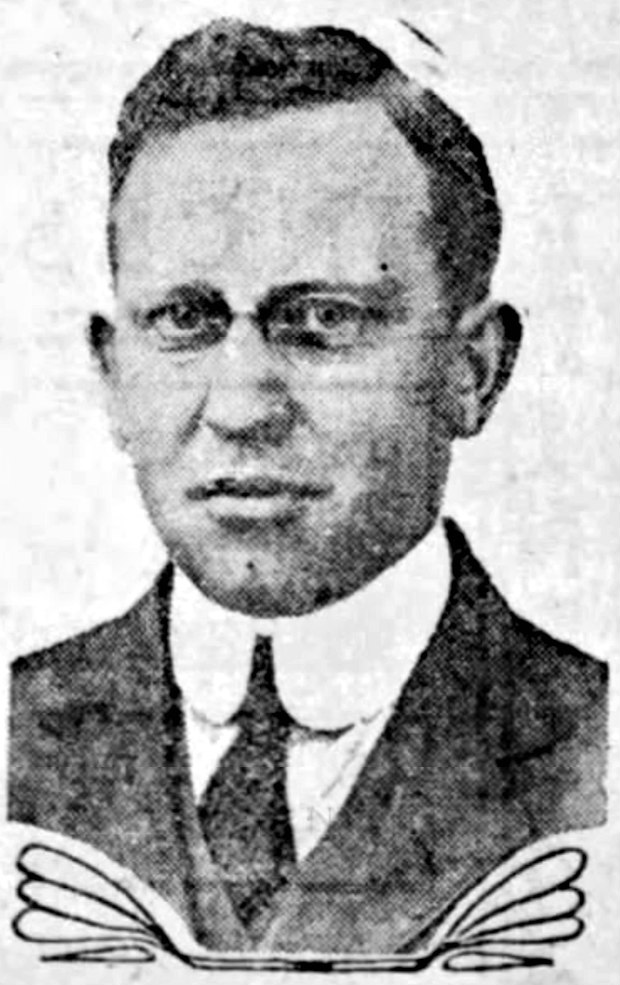
Ernie Richardson.

Ernest Lamont "Ernie" Richardson (c. 1875 in Ontario – December 9, 1952 in West Vancouver) was a Canadian businessman and sports executive in Calgary, Alberta. He was the general manager of the Calgary Industrial Exhibition and the president of the Western Canada Hockey League (WCHL), which was founded in 1921. In 1923, Richardson co-founded (with Guy Weadick) the Calgary Exhibition and Stampede as an annual event.
