= 1926 Stanley Cup Final =

1926 ice hockey championship series

	1	2	3	4	Total
Montreal Maroons (NHL)	3	3	2	2	3
Victoria Cougars (WHL)	0	0	3	0	1
- Location(s): Montreal: Montreal Forum
- Format: best-of-five
- Coaches: Montreal: Eddie Gerard; Victoria: Lester Patrick
- Captains: Montreal: Dunc Munro; Victoria: Clem Loughlin
- Dates: March 30 – April 6, 1926
- Series-winning goal: Nels Stewart (2:50, second)
- Hall of Famers: Maroons: Clint Benedict (1965); Punch Broadbent (1962); Reg Noble (1962); Babe Siebert (1964); Nels Stewart (1962); Cougars: Frank Foyston (1958); Frank Fredrickson (1958); Hap Holmes (1972); Jack Walker (1960); Coaches: Leo Dandurand (1963); Eddie Gerard (1945, player)

The 1926 Stanley Cup Final saw the National Hockey League (NHL) champion Montreal Maroons, in their first Cup Final appearance, defeat the Western Hockey League (WHL) and defending Stanley Cup champion Victoria Cougars three games to one in the best-of-five game series. This was the last time a non-NHL team would contest for the Cup – the WHL folded following the 1926 series leaving the Cup to be contested solely by NHL clubs thereafter.

== Paths to the Final ==
The Cougars finished the 1925–26 WHL regular season in third place, but eventually upset the Edmonton Eskimos in the WHL championship by a combined score of 5–3 to reach the Stanley Cup Final. Meanwhile, the Maroons finished the NHL regular season in second place; in the O'Brien Cup playoffs, the Maroons beat the third seed Pittsburgh Pirates and then went on to beat first place Ottawa Senators two goals to one in a two-game total goals series, thus capturing the O'Brien Cup and the newly introduced, redundant, Prince of Wales Trophy.

== Game summaries ==
All games in the 1926 Cup Final were played at the Montreal Forum. Aided by three future Hockey Hall of Famers, the Maroons ended up dominating the series. Goaltender Clint Benedict, who previously helped Ottawa in three Cup championships, recorded three shutouts. Rookie Nels Stewart scored 6 of Montreal's 10 overall goals in the 4 games. Punch Broadbent also recorded a goal for the Maroons. The Cougars' lone win came in game three, 3–2.

Nels Stewart scored both goals in the fourth game to win the series. Stewart had given his stick to a fan after the playoff series against Ottawa. He asked for and retrieved the stick back from the fan prior to the fourth game. He then gave back the stick to the fan after game four.

March 30	Victoria Cougars	0–3	Montreal Maroons	Montreal Forum	Recap
No scoring		First period	02:00 – Nels Stewart (1); 05:05 – Punch Broadbent (3)
No scoring		Second period	No scoring
No scoring		Third period	16:10 – Nels Stewart (2)
Hap Holmes		Goalie stats	Clint Benedict

April 1	Victoria Cougars	0–3	Montreal Maroons	Montreal Forum	Recap
No scoring		First period	10:10 – pp – Nels Stewart (3)
No scoring		Second period	09:40 – Merlyn Phillips (4)
No scoring		Third period	15:55 – pp – Dunc Munro (1)
Hap Holmes		Goalie stats	Clint Benedict

April 3	Victoria Cougars	3–2	Montreal Maroons	Montreal Forum	Recap
Haldor Halderson (1) – 16:15		First period	03:02 – Babe Siebert (2)
Clem Loughlin (1) – 10:05		Second period	No scoring
Frank Fredrickson (1) – 07:50		Third period	16:15 – Nels Stewart (4)
Hap Holmes		Goalie stats	Clint Benedict

April 6	Victoria Cougars	0–2	Montreal Maroons	Montreal Forum	Recap
No scoring		First period	No scoring
No scoring		Second period	02:50 – Nels Stewart (5); 19:10 – Nels Stewart (6)
No scoring		Third period	No scoring
Hap Holmes		Goalie stats	Clint Benedict

Montreal won series 3–1

== Stanley Cup engraving ==
The 1926 Stanley Cup was presented to Maroons captain Dunc Munro by the trophy's trustee William Foran, following the Maroons 2–0 win over the Cougars in game four.

The following Maroons players and staff had their names engraved on the Stanley Cup

1925–26 Montreal Maroons

=== Players ===
Centres

- 7 Chuck Dinny Dinsmore
- 12 Merlyn Bill Phillips
- 5 Old Poison Nels Stewart

Wingers

- 4 Harry Punch Broadbent
- 14 Bernie Brophy†
- 10 Doc Frank Carson
- 12 Shorty George Horne†
- 11 Sammy Rothschild

Defencemen

- 2 Duncan Dunc Munro (Captain)
- 9 Albert Toots Holway
- 3 Reginald Reg Noble
- 8 Chapman Hobie Kitchen†
- 6 Albert Babe Siebert

Goaltenders

- 1 Clint Benedict
- † Left off the Stanley Cup for not playing in the playoffs

=== Coaching and administrative staff ===
- James Strachan (president/owner)
- Gordon Cushings (vice president), Thomas Arnold (vice president)
- Bill O'Brien (trainer), Eddie Gerard (manager-coach)
- Donat Raymond (director), Arthur Cayford (secretary-treasurer)

=== Stanley Cup engraving ===
- Eddie Gerard name was misspelt with F. Gerard (MGR) instead E. Gerard (MGR) on the second version created in 1969. This mistake was repeated in the 1992–93 replica Stanley Cup.
- Dunc Munro became the third player to win the Stanley Cup and Olympic gold medal. Munro won the Olympic gold medal with the Toronto Granites in 1924.
- After the series win, a new ring was added directly underneath the original bowl of the Cup with the words "Won/By Montreal 'Maroons' 1925–26". In addition, players' and non-players' names were added to the trophy.

== See also ==
- 1925–26 NHL season
- 1925–26 WHL season

Preceded by Victoria Cougars; 1925	Montreal Maroons; Stanley Cup champions 1926	Succeeded by Ottawa Senators; 1927
