= Victoria Cougars =

Canadian ice hockey team (1911–1926)

- City: Victoria, British Columbia
- League: PCHA (1911–1924); WCHL (1924–1926)
- Operated: 1911–1926
- Home arena: Patrick Arena
- Colours: Blue and Yellow
- Head coach: Lester Patrick

Franchise history
- 1911–1913: Victoria Senators
- 1913–1916: Victoria Aristocrats
- 1916–1917: Spokane Canaries
- 1918–1922: Victoria Aristocrats
- 1922–1926: Victoria Cougars

Championships
- League champions: 4 (1913, 1914, 1925, 1926)
- Stanley Cups: 1 (1925)

The Victoria Cougars were a major league professional ice hockey team that played in the Pacific Coast Hockey Association (PCHA) from 1911 to 1924 under various names, and (after the PCHA's merger with the Western Canada Hockey League) in the Western Hockey League (WHL) from 1924 to 1926. The team was based in Victoria, British Columbia, and won the Stanley Cup in 1925, becoming the final non-NHL team to win the Cup.

== History ==
The original Victoria franchise of the PCHA, the Victoria Senators, were formed in 1911, and became the Victoria Aristocrats in 1915. The Aristocrats challenged the Toronto Blueshirts for the Stanley Cup the following year, but lost. In 1916 the team was forced to move to Spokane, Washington, after having their arena (Patrick Arena) commandeered by the Canadian military. The club folded the following year as the Spokane Canaries.

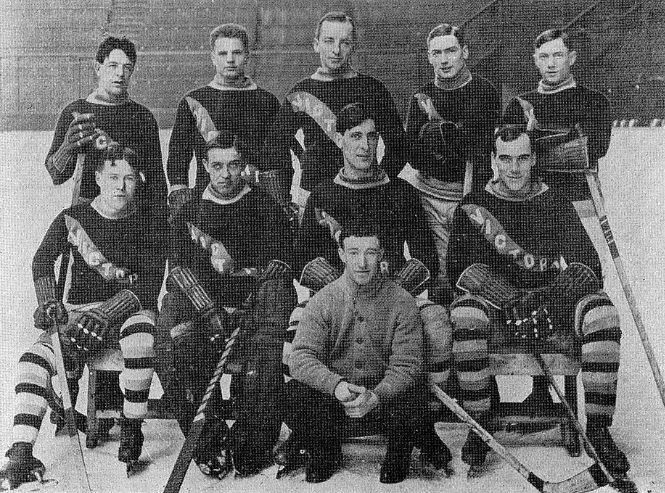
1914–15 Victoria Aristocrats.

A new team was formed in 1918 and again were dubbed the Victoria Aristocrats, with players from the folded Portland Rosebuds. In 1922 they changed their name to the Victoria Cougars. Led by coach Lester Patrick, the Cougars won the Stanley Cup in 1925 against the Montreal Canadiens of the National Hockey League (NHL). The Cougars were the last non-NHL team to hoist the Stanley Cup as well as the last west coast team to win it until the Anaheim Ducks did so in 2007. They attempted to repeat as champions in 1926 but they lost the final series to the NHL's Montreal Maroons.

The WHL dissolved after the season. That spring, a group of businessmen from Detroit won an NHL expansion franchise and bought the rights to many of the players from the Stanley Cup finalist Cougars. The new NHL franchise adopted the nickname "Cougars" in tribute. The Detroit Cougars were later renamed the Detroit Falcons, and were ultimately renamed the Detroit Red Wings.

Among the notable players who played for the Cougars were Hall of Famers Hec Fowler (goaltender), Frank Foyston, Frank Fredrickson, Hap Holmes (goaltender), Clem Loughlin, Harry Meeking and Jack Walker.

== Seasons ==
Note: W = Wins, L = Losses, T = Ties, GF= Goals For, GA = Goals Against

Season	Name	League	GP	W	L	T	GF	GA	Finish	Playoffs
1912	Senators	PCHA	16	7	9	0	81	90	3rd	-
1912–13	Senators	PCHA	15	10	5	0	68	56	1st	-
1913–14	Aristocrats	PCHA	15	10	5	0	80	67	1st	Lost Stanley Cup playoff to Toronto Blueshirts
1914–15	Aristocrats	PCHA	17	4	13	0	64	116	3rd	-
1915–16	Aristocrats	PCHA	18	5	13	0	74	102	4th	-
1916–17	Canaries	PCHA	24	8	15	0	89	143	4th	-
~~1917–18~~	-	PCHA	Team folded after previous season in Spokane. Victoria arena still in use for war-time military training.							
1918–19	Aristocrats	PCHA	20	7	13	0	44	81	3rd	-
1919–20	Aristocrats	PCHA	22	10	12	0	57	71	3rd	-
1920–21	Aristocrats	PCHA	24	10	13	1	21	72	3rd	-
1921–22	Aristocrats	PCHA	24	11	12	1	61	71	3rd	-
1922–23	Cougars	PCHA	30	16	14	0	94	85	2nd	Lost in PCHA playoff
1923–24	Cougars	PCHA	30	11	18	1	78	103	3rd	-
1924–25	Cougars	WCHL	28	16	12	0	84	63	3rd	Won WCHL, Won Stanley Cup
1925–26	Cougars	WHL	30	15	11	4	68	53	3rd	Won WHL, Lost Stanley Cup Finals

== Victoria Cougars: 1925 Stanley Cup champions ==
=== Players ===
Centres

Wingers

- Frank Fredrickson
- Frank Foyston
- Wally Elmer
- Harold Gizzy Hart
- Harry Meeking
- Jack Walker

Defencemen

- Clem Loughlin (Captain)
- Gord Fraser
- Haldor Halderson

Goaltenders

- Harry Hap Holmes

=== Coaching and administrative staff ===
- Lester Patrick (Owner-President/Manager-Coach)
- Larry Brunnell (Trainer) - name is missing from the Stanley Cup.

=== Stanley Cup engraving ===
- After the series win, a new angled ring with the words "Won/By/'Cougars' Victoria, B.C. 1925" was added between the original bowl of the Cup and the original first ring of the base. All players and the manager were included on the new ring, but trainer Larry Brunnell was left off.

== Bibliography ==
- Bowlsby, Craig H. (2012), Empire of Ice: The Rise and Fall of the Pacific Coast Hockey Association, 1911–1926, Vancouver: Knights of Winter, ISBN 978-0-9691705-6-3
- MacLeod, Alan Livingstone (2021), Capitals, Aristocrats, and Cougars: Victoria's Hockey Professionals, 1911–1926, Victoria: Heritage House, ISBN 978-1-77203-373-1
- Whitehead, Eric (1980), The Patricks: Hockey's Royal Family, New York City: Doubleday, ISBN 0-385-15662-6

== See also ==
- List of ice hockey teams in British Columbia
- List of Stanley Cup champions

Preceded by Montreal Canadiens; 1924	Stanley Cup Champions; 1925	Succeeded by Montreal Maroons; 1926
Preceded by Calgary Tigers; 1923–24	WCHL Champions; 1924–25	Succeeded by Victoria Cougars; 1925–26
Preceded by Victoria Cougars; 1924–25	WHL Champions; 1925–26	Succeeded by –
