= Western Canada Hockey League =

Former professional ice hockey league

- Sport: Ice hockey
- Founded: 1921 (105 years ago)
- First season: 1921–22
- Folded: 1926 (100 years ago)
- Countries: Canada (5 teams); United States (1 team)
- Last champion: Victoria Cougars (1925–26)
- Most titles: Victoria Cougars (2)

The Western Canada Hockey League (WCHL), founded in 1921, was a major professional ice hockey league originally based in the prairies of Canada. It was renamed the Western Hockey League (WHL) in 1925 and disbanded in 1926.

The WCHL's Victoria Cougars were the last non-NHL team to win the Stanley Cup when they won the 1925 Stanley Cup Finals over the NHL's Montreal Canadiens.

== History ==
=== Background ===
The Stanley Cup was donated in 1893 to serve as a trophy to be awarded to the national champion of Canadian amateur ice hockey. The trophy eventually became open to professional teams in 1906 and a new trophy, the Allan Cup was donated to serve as the national amateur trophy. By this time, the Canadian Prairies were being rapidly settled and in 1914 a team based in Saskatchewan (the Regina Victorias) would capture the Allan Cup for the first time. By this time, competition for the Stanley Cup, had evolved into a World Series-inspired "East vs. West" affair to be contested between the winners of the two professional hockey leagues then in business, the Pacific Coast Hockey Association (PCHA), based in British Columbia, Washington and Oregon and the National Hockey Association (NHA), based in Ontario and Quebec. Although the PCHA won two of the first three Stanley Cup series contested under this format, the National Hockey League (NHL) came to dominate Stanley Cup play after it replaced the NHA as the premier Eastern competition in 1917.

=== Early years ===
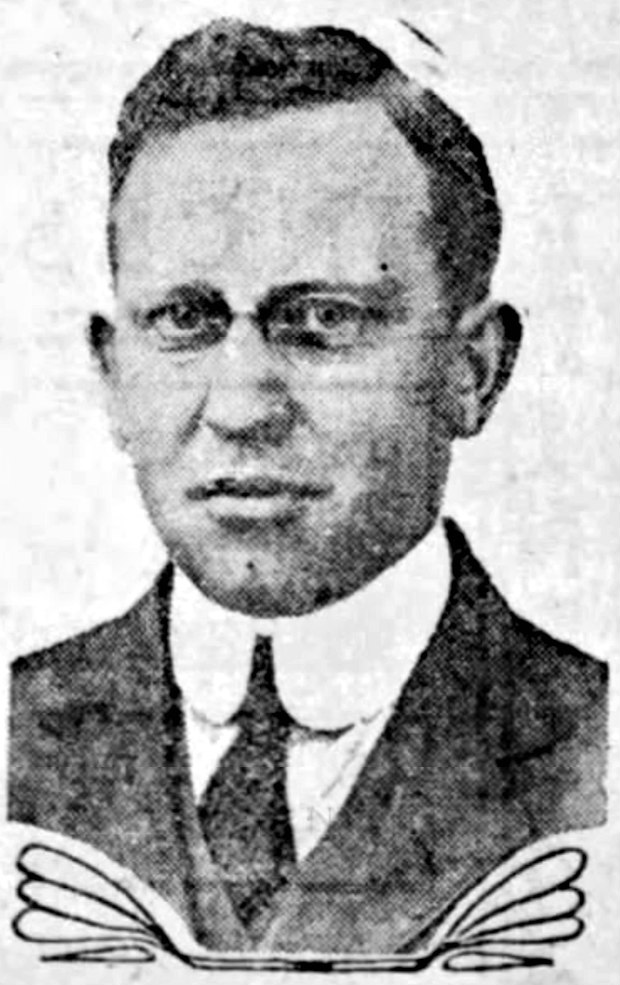
League president E. L. "Ernie" Richardson.

In 1921, the Edmonton Eskimos and Calgary Tigers of the Big Four League saw their league collapse on allegations of pay for amateurs. Together with the Regina Capitals and Saskatoon Sheiks the teams organized the openly professional Western Canada Hockey League (WCHL). The league was organized under the presidency of E. L. "Ernie" Richardson of Calgary, with Wesley Champ of Regina, Robert Pinder of Saskatoon, K. C. "Kenny" MacKenzie of Edmonton, and J. Lloyd Turner of Calgary, becoming the directors. The league, like the National Hockey League (NHL), played six-man hockey, without the old rover position. At the time, there was not yet a clear distinction between "major" and "minor" professional leagues in any North American sport other than baseball and the new league was recognized as a comparable league to the existing Pacific Coast Hockey Association (PCHA). The winner of a series between the champions of the two leagues would go on to face the winner of the NHL for the coveted Stanley Cup.

The league started with high hopes in a general climate of optimism that followed the end of the First World War. Like another then-fledgling professional league in a different sport (the American Professional Football Association, forerunners to today's National Football League) the WCHL was centered in smaller cities with populations of under 100,000 people. In an era where professional sport was considered to be a seasonal occupation to be supplemented by off-season work, salaries even at the major professional level were relatively small and thought to be within the means of clubs in markets as small as Saskatoon and Moose Jaw.

The WCHL's first season, 1921–22, saw the Saskatoon Sheiks have money problems and relocate to Moose Jaw, Saskatchewan, to become the Moose Jaw Sheiks. The Edmonton Eskimos won the regular season standings, but were upset in the playoffs by the second place Regina Capitals. The Capitals then faced the Vancouver Millionaires of the PCHA to determine who would go on to face the Toronto St. Patricks of the NHL for the Stanley Cup. Vancouver won the series against Regina, but lost to Toronto in the Stanley Cup finals.

In the next season, the Moose Jaw team folded, but the WCHL returned to Saskatoon with a new franchise, the Saskatoon Crescents, led by Newsy Lalonde. The WCHL and PCHA started playing inter-league games, but kept separate standings. The Edmonton Eskimos won the regular season, but lost to the NHL's Ottawa Senators in the Stanley Cup finals.

In the 1923–24 WCHL season, the Calgary Tigers finished in first place while Edmonton finished at the bottom of the standings. The playoffs were changed this year, too, despite a protest from the Montreal Canadiens of the NHL. Instead of the two western leagues playing off to see who would play the NHL champion for the Stanley Cup, the president of the PCHA, Frank Patrick, insisted that the NHL champion had to play the PCHA winner first. This change ended up not making any difference for Montreal, as the team swept Vancouver and then Calgary for the Stanley Cup.

For the 1924–25 WCHL season, the PCHA folded and two of its teams, the Vancouver Maroons and Victoria Cougars joined the WCHL, giving the league six teams. The Saskatoon franchise became the Saskatoon Sheiks. The league had some top-level talent on its rosters, with stars such as Bun Cook and Bill Cook and rookie Eddie Shore. The Victoria Cougars, coached and managed by PCHA founder Lester Patrick, won the league championship and went on to face the Montreal Canadiens for the Stanley Cup. Victoria easily beat the Canadiens three games to one, out scoring them 16 to 8. This would be the shining moment for the WCHL as Victoria became the first non-NHL team to win the Stanley Cup since the formation of the NHL in 1917. Since then, no non-NHL team has won the Cup. In fact, the next season, 1925–26, would be the last time a team from outside the NHL would even challenge for it.

=== Collapse ===
The WCHL was never particularly stable. A major factor weakening the league's long term prospects for success was the lack of any teams in Winnipeg, then by far the largest city in the Prairies. Due to the city's relatively large size, the league hoped to ice multiple teams in the Manitoban capital (similar to how Montreal, then the largest city in Canada, hosted both the Canadiens and Maroons in the NHL). The rationale was both a desire to boost the total number of teams and a fear that a single Winnipeg team would dominate the league. However, no potential ownership group was willing to ice a team in Winnipeg without being granted the sort of territorial exclusivity that was by then common practice in North American professional sports leagues.

The beginning of the end came in 1924 when the NHL first expanded into the United States. With the NHL rapidly expanding, salaries were on the rise and the WCHL was finding it difficult to keep its star players. In 1925, the Regina Capitals relocated to Portland, Oregon, and rekindled the old name of Portland Rosebuds, which had been out of use since 1918. With the move into the U.S. came a name change for the WCHL - "Canada" was dropped and the league was renamed the Western Hockey League (WHL). In the eastern half of the continent, the NHL eventually achieved relative stability through large-scale expansion to the U.S. and the NHL achieved prosperity by abandoning most of its smaller cities in favour of large markets. Such a path to success was not a viable option for the WHL because few U.S. cities west of the Mississippi River had large arenas with ice plants in the 1920s. For example, St. Louis did not have such a facility until an ice plant was installed in the St. Louis Arena in 1931.

The Edmonton Eskimos won the regular season for the third time in five seasons, but it was the Victoria Cougars who won the league championship and moved on to play for the Stanley Cup. Expectations were high for the defending Stanley Cup champions, but Montreal's other NHL team, the Montreal Maroons, were too strong for Victoria handily beating them three games to one and out scoring them 10 to 3.

By the 1925–26 season, WHL teams were openly selling players to their richer NHL rivals to stay afloat. Nevertheless, financial problems were too great to overcome, the NHL board of governors intervened by purchasing the contracts of every player in the WHL for $258,000 and the league formally disbanded. While the remnants of five former WHL teams immediately formed the professional Prairie Hockey League, the western teams had been stripped of their best players while the NHL and the Stanley Cup's trustees regarded the PrHL as a new minor league and not a continuation of the major professional WHL. The new league would contract to just three Saskatchewan-based teams by 1927 and disappear altogether in 1928.

Although rival leagues were not formally barred from challenging for the Cup until 1947, the WHL's collapse left the NHL as the only top-level professional league in North America. In the meantime, the Cup trustees refused to accept challenges from any rival league. In what was the most significant expansion of its early era, the NHL added three teams for its 1926–27 season, all of which survived the Great Depression to form half of the so-called Original Six in later years. Separate deals were made in stocking the new teams. The rights to the Victoria Cougars' players were bought by the Detroit franchise (which would eventually become the Detroit Red Wings) causing the team to be named the Detroit Cougars in their honor, and the Portland Rosebuds' players' rights were purchased by Frederic McLaughlin for his new Black Hawks team. The New York Rangers did not come to any similar agreement with any team but they grabbed players from certain teams like the Saskatoon Sheiks with the Cook brothers, but never-the-less, the Rangers were the most well rounded team of the three in its early years, including winning a Stanley Cup title in 1928, their second season. Other players of the Saskatoon, Calgary, Edmonton, and Moose Jaw teams went to the already established teams like Eddie Shore going to the Boston Bruins who achieved success in 1929, winning the Stanley Cup that year. Its legacy still lives on with many players from that league being enshrined into the Hockey Hall of Fame.

== Gallery ==
Some of the high profile players who spent considerable time in the WCHL:

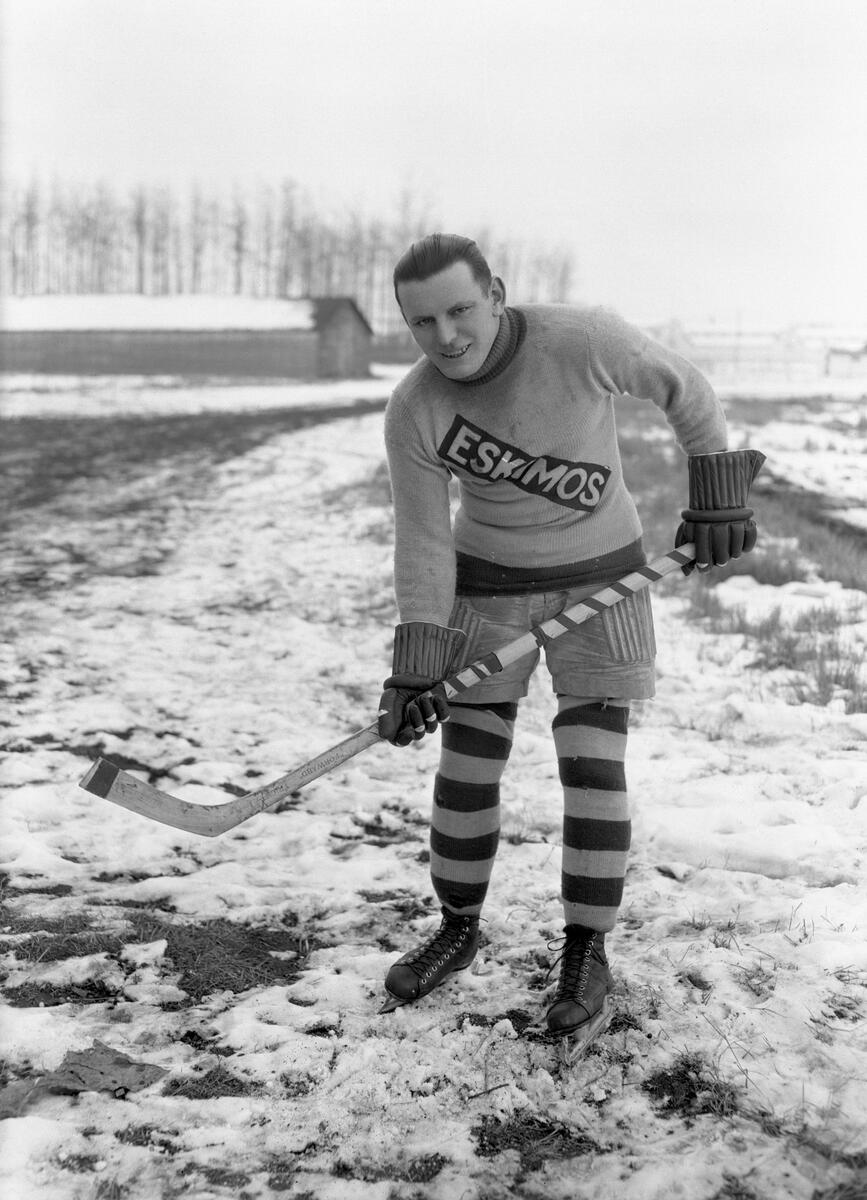
Duke Keats with the Edmonton Eskimos

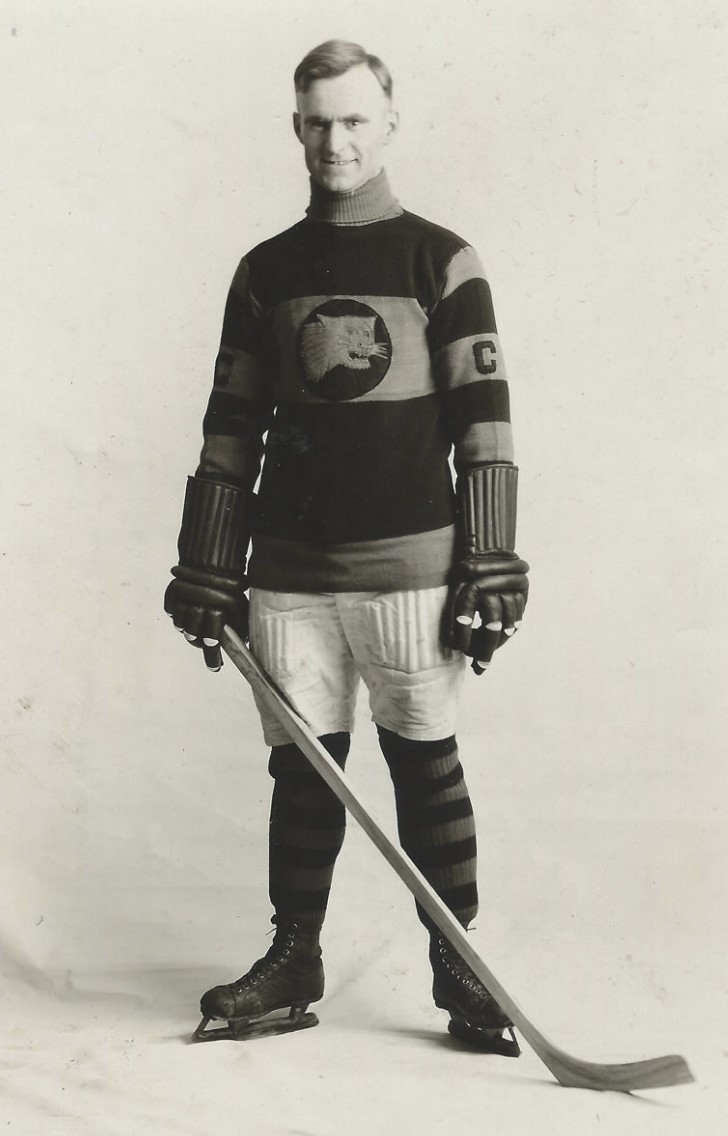
Barney Stanley with the Calgary Tigers

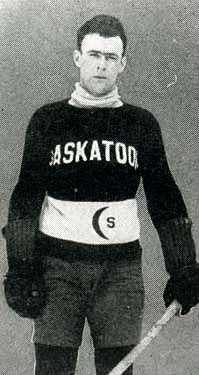
Bill Cook with the Saskatoon Crescents

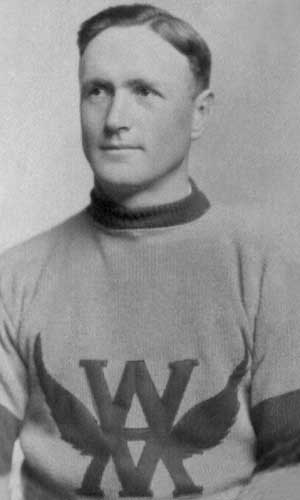
Clem Loughlin with the Victoria Cougars

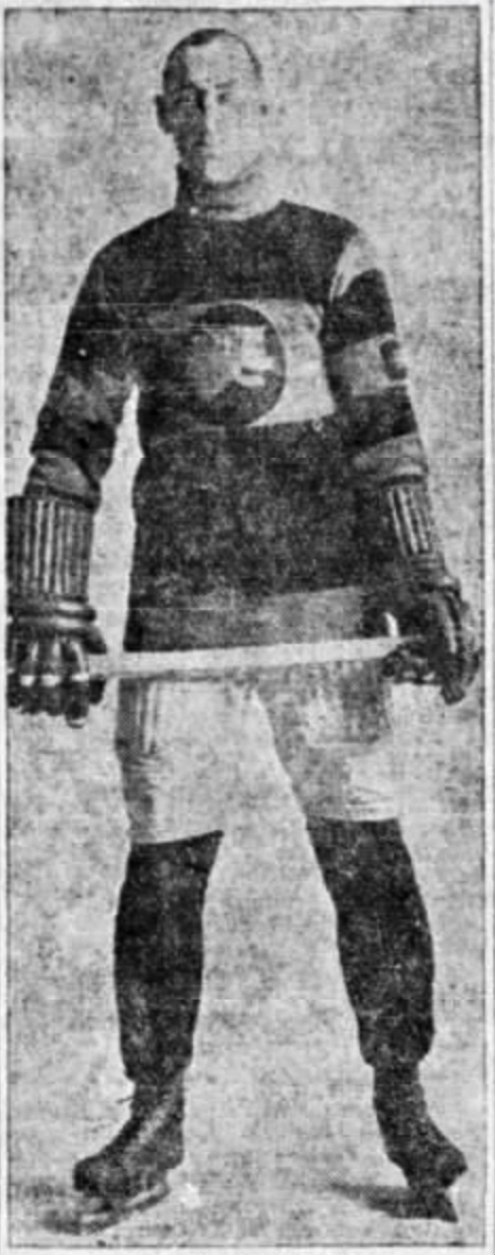
Herb Gardiner with the Calgary Tigers

== Franchises ==
- Calgary Tigers (1921–1926)
- Edmonton Eskimos (1921–1926)
- Regina Capitals (1921–1925), Portland Rosebuds (1925–1926)
- Saskatoon Sheiks (1921–1922), Moose Jaw Sheiks (1921–1922), Saskatoon Crescents (1922–1923), Saskatoon Sheiks (1923-1926)
- Vancouver Maroons (1924–1926)
- Victoria Cougars (1924–1926)

== Seasons ==
Season	Regular season winner	Playoff champion
1921–22	Edmonton Eskimos	Regina Capitals
1922–23	Edmonton Eskimos	Edmonton Eskimos
1923–24	Calgary Tigers	Calgary Tigers
1924–25	Calgary Tigers	Victoria Cougars
1925–26	Edmonton Eskimos	Victoria Cougars

== See also ==
- List of Stanley Cup champions
- Pacific Coast Hockey Association
- World Hockey Association
- List of ice hockey leagues
