= 1915 Stanley Cup Final =

1915 ice hockey championship series

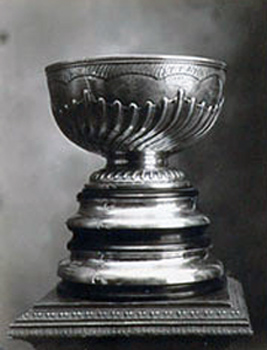
- The Stanley Cup in 1921. It would have looked the same in 1915.
	1	2	3	Total
Vancouver Millionaires (PCHA)	6	8	12	3
Ottawa Senators (NHA)	2	3	3	0
- PCHA rules: 1,3 NHA: 2
- Location(s): Vancouver: Denman Arena
- Format: best-of-five
- Coaches: Vancouver: Frank Patrick; Ottawa: Frank Shaughnessy (mgr.)
- Dates: March 22–26, 1915
- Series-winning goal: Barney Stanley (5:30, second)
- Hall of Famers: Millionaires: Si Griffis (1950); Hughie Lehman (1958); Mickey MacKay (1952); Frank Nighbor (1947); Frank Patrick (1950, builder); Barney Stanley (1963); Cyclone Taylor (1947); Senators: Clint Benedict (1965); Punch Broadbent (1962); Jack Darragh (1962); Eddie Gerard (1945); Art Ross (1949); Coaches: Frank Patrick (1950)

The 1915 Stanley Cup Final was played from March 22–26, 1915. The Pacific Coast Hockey Association (PCHA) champion Vancouver Millionaires swept the National Hockey Association (NHA) champion Ottawa Senators three games to none in a best-of-five game series. The finals were played in Vancouver, with games one, three and five played under PCHA rules. The Millionaires became the first team from the PCHA to win the Cup. This was the second Stanley Cup championship series between the champions of the NHA and the PCHA and the first held in a PCHA rink.

== Paths to the series ==
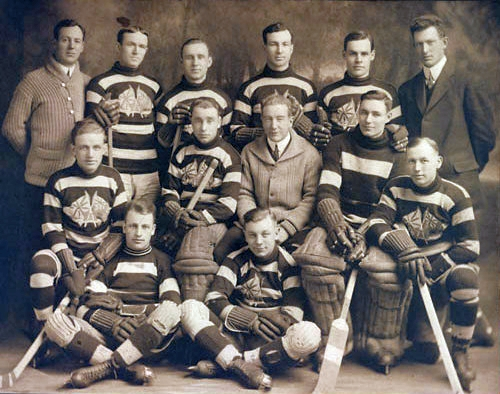
The Ottawa Senators during the 1914–15 NHA season.

In 1914, the PCHA and NHA agreed to a yearly Stanley Cup championship series between the two teams that won each league for the right to hold the Stanley Cup, effectively ending the challenge era for the Cup.

Vancouver finished the 1914–15 PCHA regular season in first place, and thus winning that league's title, with a record of 13–4. Meanwhile, Ottawa and the Montreal Wanderers both finished the 1914–15 NHA regular season tied for first place with identical 14–6 records, and thus had to play a two-game total goals series to determine the NHA champion. Ottawa won this series 4–1 to advance to the Stanley Cup series. Ottawa left for Vancouver, which hosted the series that year, on March 15. Vancouver captain Si Griffis missed the series due to a broken leg from an exhibition series against NHA all-stars held while waiting for the Finals to start.

== Game summaries ==
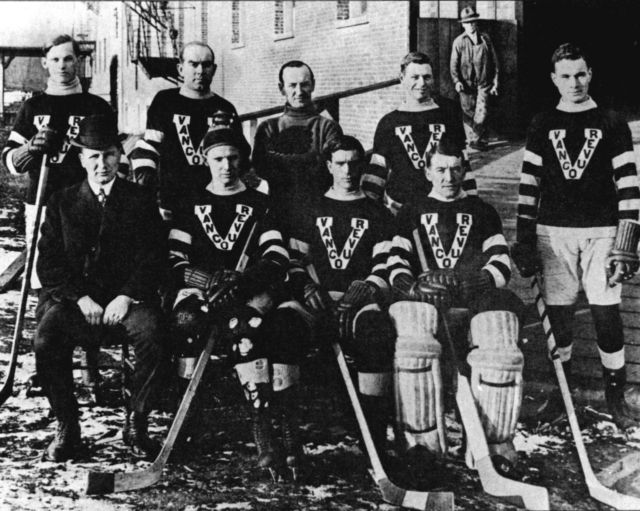
The Vancouver Millionaires during the 1914–15 PCHA season.

All games of the championship finals were played at Vancouver's Denman Arena, the home of the PCHA champion Millionaires. Vancouver ended up sweeping the series with victories of 6–2, 8–3, and 12–3, scoring 26 total goals while limiting the Senators to just eight overall. Former Senator Cyclone Taylor led the Millionaires with six goals. Future Hockey Hall of Famer Barney Stanley scored five goals, including three in the second period of game three. The Cup was not brought west to Vancouver by the Senators, so was not immediately presented to the winners.

Game-by-Game		Winning team	Score	Losing team	Rules Used	Location
1	March 22	Vancouver Millionaires	6–2	Ottawa Senators	PCHA	Denman Arena, Vancouver
2	March 24	Vancouver Millionaires	8–3	Ottawa Senators	NHA	Denman Arena, Vancouver
3	March 26	Vancouver Millionaires	12–3	Ottawa Senators	PCHA	Denman Arena, Vancouver
Millionaires win best-of-five series 3–0

- Vancouver Millionaires PCHA champions - Starting Lineup - Hugh Leahman goalie, Lloydy Cook point, Frank Patrick (manager-coach/owner) cover point, Fred "Cyclone" Taylor rover-centre, Duncan "Mickey" MacKay centre-left wing, Frank Nighbor right wing, Russell "Barney" Stanley left wing - subs Kenny Mallen defence, Jim Seanborn defence, Silas "Si" Griffis (captain) defence - Spare - Jean "Johnny" Matz - Centre
- Ottawa Senators NHA champions - Starting Lineup - Clint Benedict goalie, Horace Merrill point, Art Ross cover point, Eddie Gerard (Captain) - left wing-rover, Angus Duford centre, Harry "Punch" Broadbent right wing, Leth Graham left wing - subs Jack Darragh right wing-centre, Hamilton "Hamby" Shore left wing - Spares - Bill Bell centre, Fred Lake defence, Ed Lowrey centre, Art Sullivan centre, Sammy Herbert - goalie, Frank Saughneesy (Manager), Alf Smith (Coach).

== Stanley Cup engraving ==
The 1915 Stanley Cup was presented by the trophy's trustee William Foran.

The following Millionaires players and staff were eligible to have their names engraved on the Stanley Cup

1914–15 Vancouver Millionaires

=== Players ===
Centres

- Mickey MacKay
- Fred Cyclone Taylor‡

Wingers

- Frank Nighbor
- Russell Barney Stanley

Defencemen

- Lloyd Cook
- Silas Si Griffis (C)
- Ken Mallen
- Frank Patrick (owner/president/manager/coach/defence)
- Jim Seaborn

Goaltenders

- Hughie Lehman

=== Coaching and administrative staff ===
- None (see Frank Patrick)

‡ Played rover, a position between both defencemen and behind the centre.

=== Stanley Cup engraving ===
The Senators had the words "Ottawa/NHA Champions/1914–15" engraved on the base of the trophy's original bowl even though they did not win the Cup final. This was the practice of the challenge era. The trophy was officially passed on to the winner of the league championship of the previous Cup champion's league. The previous Cup winner was the 1913–14 NHA champion Toronto Blueshirts. However, the trustees had excused themselves from organizing challenges after the previous championship series.

After the series, "Vancouver B.C./1914–15/Defeated Ottawa/3 Straight Games" was added to the Cup. Eight players' names and the manager's name were also engraved inside the bowl along the fluted sides.

Ken Mallen played 14 of 16 regular-season games and two of three games in the series. Mallen's name was left off by mistake. Johnny Matz, who played one game in the regular season before being released, was not on the Cup either.

== See also ==
- 1914–15 NHA season
- 1914–15 PCHA season

Preceded by Toronto Hockey Club; 1914	Vancouver Millionaires; Stanley Cup champions 1915	Succeeded by Montreal Canadiens; 1916
