= 1914–15 Ottawa Senators season =

Canadian ice hockey club season

1914–15 Ottawa Senators
- O'Brien Trophy winners
- League: 1st NHA
- 1914–15 record: 14–6–0
- Goals for: 74
- Goals against: 65

Team information
- General manager: Frank Shaughnessy
- Coach: Alf Smith
- Arena: The Arena

Team leaders
- Goals: Harry Broadbent (26)
- Goals against average: Clint Benedict (3.3)

The 1914–15 Ottawa Senators season was the Ottawa Hockey Club's 30th season of play since its founding in 1883 (with some inactive years in the 1880s). After placing fourth in 1913–14, the Senators improved to win the NHA title, but lost the Stanley Cup 'World Series' playoff to the Vancouver Millionaires, played in Vancouver.

== Team business ==
The Senators traded Percy LeSueur to the Ontarios for Fred Lake.

== Regular season ==
=== Final standings ===
National Hockey Association
	GP	W	L	T	GF	GA
Ottawa Senators	20	14	6	0	74	65
Montreal Wanderers	20	14	6	0	127	82
Quebec Bulldogs	20	11	9	0	85	85
Toronto Hockey Club	20	8	12	0	66	84
Toronto Ontarios-Shamrocks	20	7	13	0	76	96
Montreal Canadiens	20	6	14	0	65	81

Note: W = Wins, L = Losses, T = Ties, GF= Goals For, GA = Goals Against

== Schedule and results ==
Month	Day	Visitor	Score	Home	Score	Record
Dec.	26	Ottawa	4	Quebec	1	1–0
Dec.	30	Ontarios	1	Ottawa	4	2–0
Jan.	2	Ottawa	6	Wanderers	15	2–1
Jan.	6	Ottawa	4	Canadiens	2	3–1
Jan.	9	Toronto	1	Ottawa	2 (18' OT)	4–1
Jan.	13	Ottawa	3	Ontarios	5	4–2
Jan.	16	Wanderers	3	Ottawa	4	5–2
Jan.	20	Canadiens	1	Ottawa	3	6–2
Jan.	23	Ottawa	2	Toronto	4	6–3
Jan.	27	Quebec	2	Ottawa	7	7–3
Jan.	30	Ottawa	3	Quebec	1	8–3
Feb.	3	Toronto	2	Ottawa	7	9–3
Feb.	6	Ottawa	1	Wanderers	8	9–4
Feb.	10	Ottawa	6	Ontarios	2	10–4
Feb.	13	Canadiens	3	Ottawa	5	11–4
Feb.	17	Ottawa	3	Toronto	1	12–4
Feb.	20	Wanderers	5	Ottawa	1	12–5
Feb.	24	Ottawa	2	Canadiens	3	12–6
Feb.	27	Ontarios	2	Ottawa	3	13–6
Mar.	3	Quebec	3	Ottawa	4 (25" OT)	14–6

Source: Coleman, pp. 272–273.

=== Scoring leaders ===
Player	GP	G	A	Pts	PIM
Harry Broadbent	20	24	3	27	115
Eddie Gerard	20	9	10	19	39
Jack Darragh	18	11	2	13	32
Leth Graham	17	9	3	12	34
Angus Duford	12	7	1	8	8

=== Goaltending averages ===
Name	Club	GP	GA	SO	Avg.
Benedict, Clint	Ottawa	20	65		3.3

== Playoffs ==
=== League championship ===
Montreal and Ottawa played a two-game total-goals series to determine the league championship and the O'Brien Cup.

Game-by-Game		Winning team	Score	Losing team	Location
1	March 10	Ottawa Senators	4–0	Montreal Wanderers	Ottawa
2	March 13	Montreal Wanderers	1–0	Ottawa Senators	Montreal
Senators win series 4–1

=== Stanley Cup Final ===
As the 1914 Final was held in Toronto, all three games in this series were played at the arena of the PCHA's champion in Vancouver, British Columbia. The Millionaires swept the best-of-five series in three games.

Game-by-Game		Winning Team	Score	Losing Team	Rules Used	Location
1	March 22	Vancouver Millionaires	6–2	Ottawa Senators	PCHA	Denman Arena, Vancouver
2	March 24	Vancouver Millionaires	8–3	Ottawa Senators	NHA	Denman Arena, Vancouver
3	March 26	Vancouver Millionaires	12–3	Ottawa Senators	PCHA	Denman Arena, Vancouver
Millionaires win best-of-five series 3 games to 0

== See also ==
- 1914–15 NHA season
