= Ottawa Cliffsides =

- City: Ottawa, Ontario; Canada
- League: OCSHL (1905–1908); IPAHU (1908–1911); OCSHL (1919–20)
- Colours: Light Blue, White
- Head coach: Alf Smith (1909)

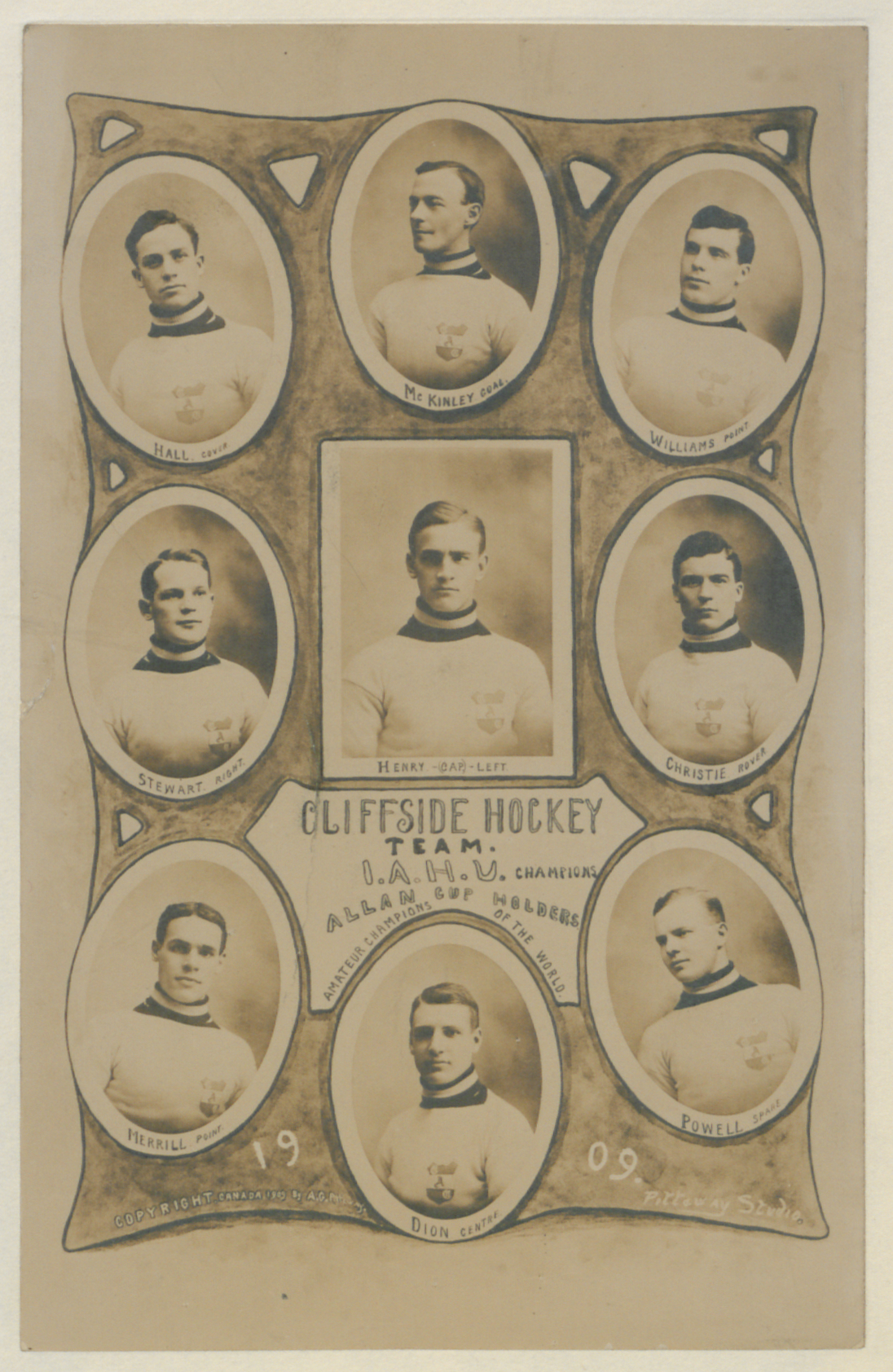
Ottawa Cliffsides in 1909.

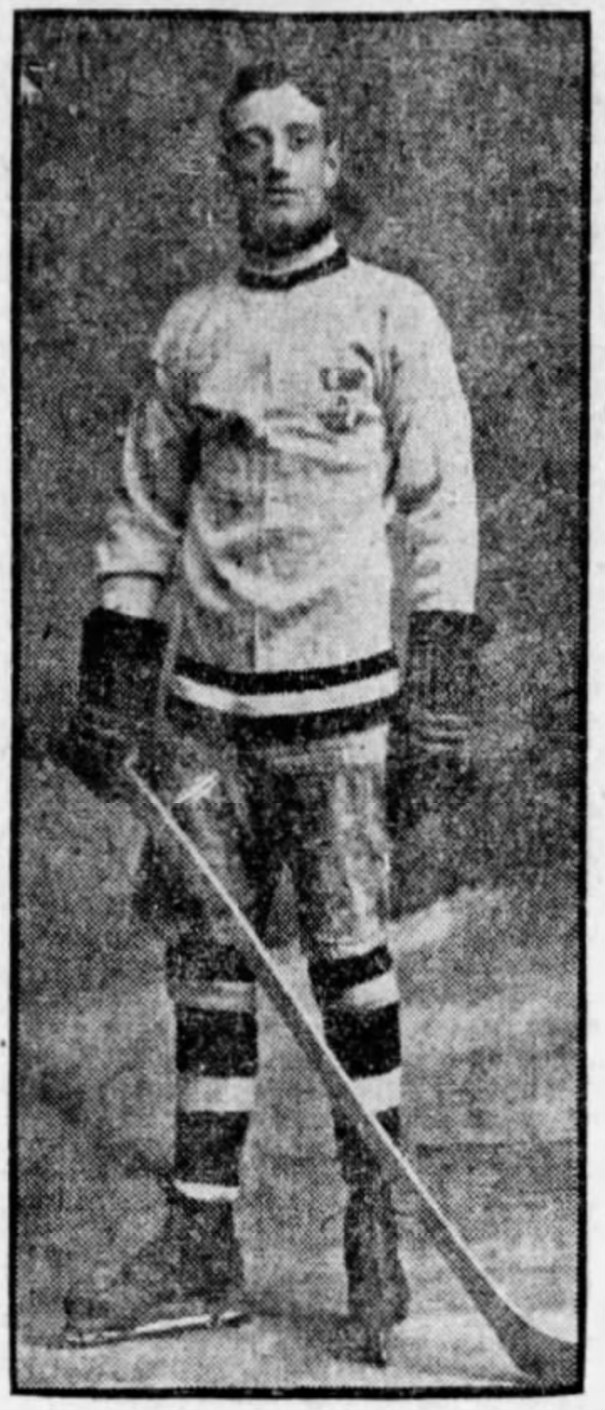
Billy Smith (a younger brother of Alf, Harry and Tommy Smith) with the 1910–11 Ottawa Cliffsides.

The Ottawa Cliffsides were a senior ice hockey team that played in the Inter-Provincial Amateur Hockey Union from 1908 to 1911. Prior to that, from 1905 to 1908, they competed in the Ottawa City Senior League.

They were the first winner of the Allan Cup in 1909 when the cup was given to the winner of the Inter-Provincial Hockey League. Alf Smith coached the Ottawa Cliffsides to win the first Allan Cup in March 1909, only to lose it to Queen's University in a challenge.

The Cliffsides played for only three seasons in the Inter-Provincial league. They then reappeared in the Ottawa City Senior League in 1919–20 before disappearing for good.

== Season-by-season results ==
=== Inter-Provincial Amateur Hockey Union ===
Season	Games	Won	Lost	Tied	Points	Goals for	Goals against	Playoffs
1908–09	6	5	1	0	10	56	43	Awarded Allan Cup, Lost Allan Cup Final
1909–10	6	4	2	0	8	59	43	Lost Final
1910–11	6	5	1	0	10	50	24	Lost Final

=== Ottawa City Senior League ===
Season	Games	Won	Lost	Tied	Points	Goals for	Goals against	Playoffs
1919–20	7	4	3	0	8	10	8	Missed playoffs

== Notable players ==
- Punch Broadbent
- Jack Darragh
- Horace Merrill
- Coo Dion
- Arthur Sixsmith
- Norman Scott
- Alec Connell
