= Coo Dion =

Canadian ice hockey player and soldier

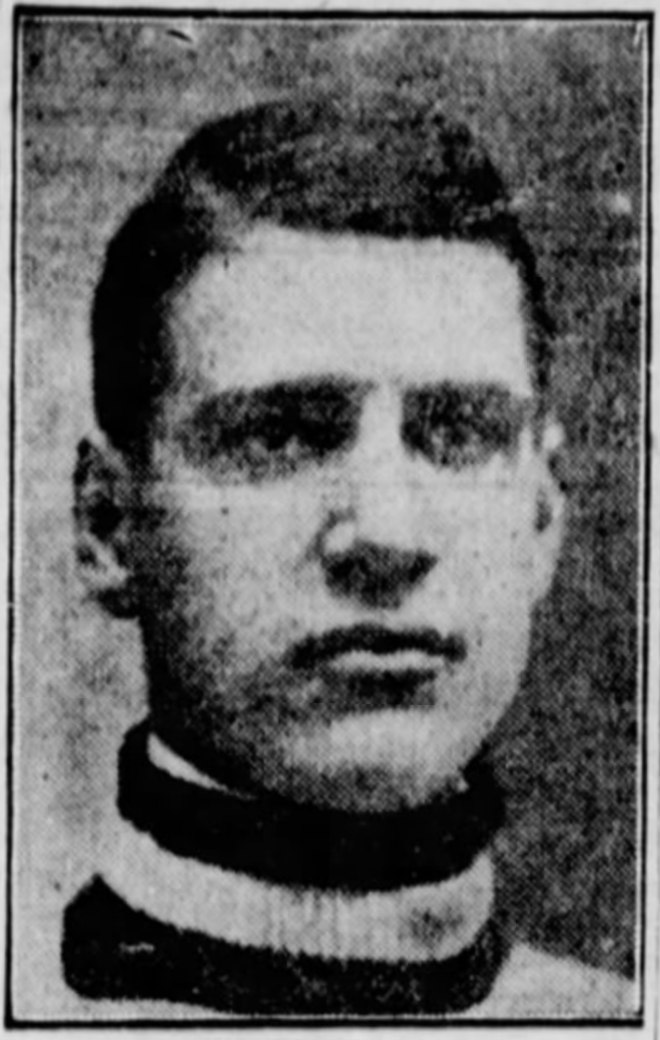
- Born: December 23, 1886 Ottawa, Ontario, Canada
- Died: April 10, 1959 (aged 72) Toronto, Ontario, Canada
- Height: 5 ft 10 in (178 cm)
- Weight: 156 lb (71 kg; 11 st 2 lb)
- Position: Rover/Centre
- Played for: Ottawa Cliffsides; Ottawa Hockey Club; Ottawa Stewartons; Winnipeg Victorias
- Playing career: 1905–1913

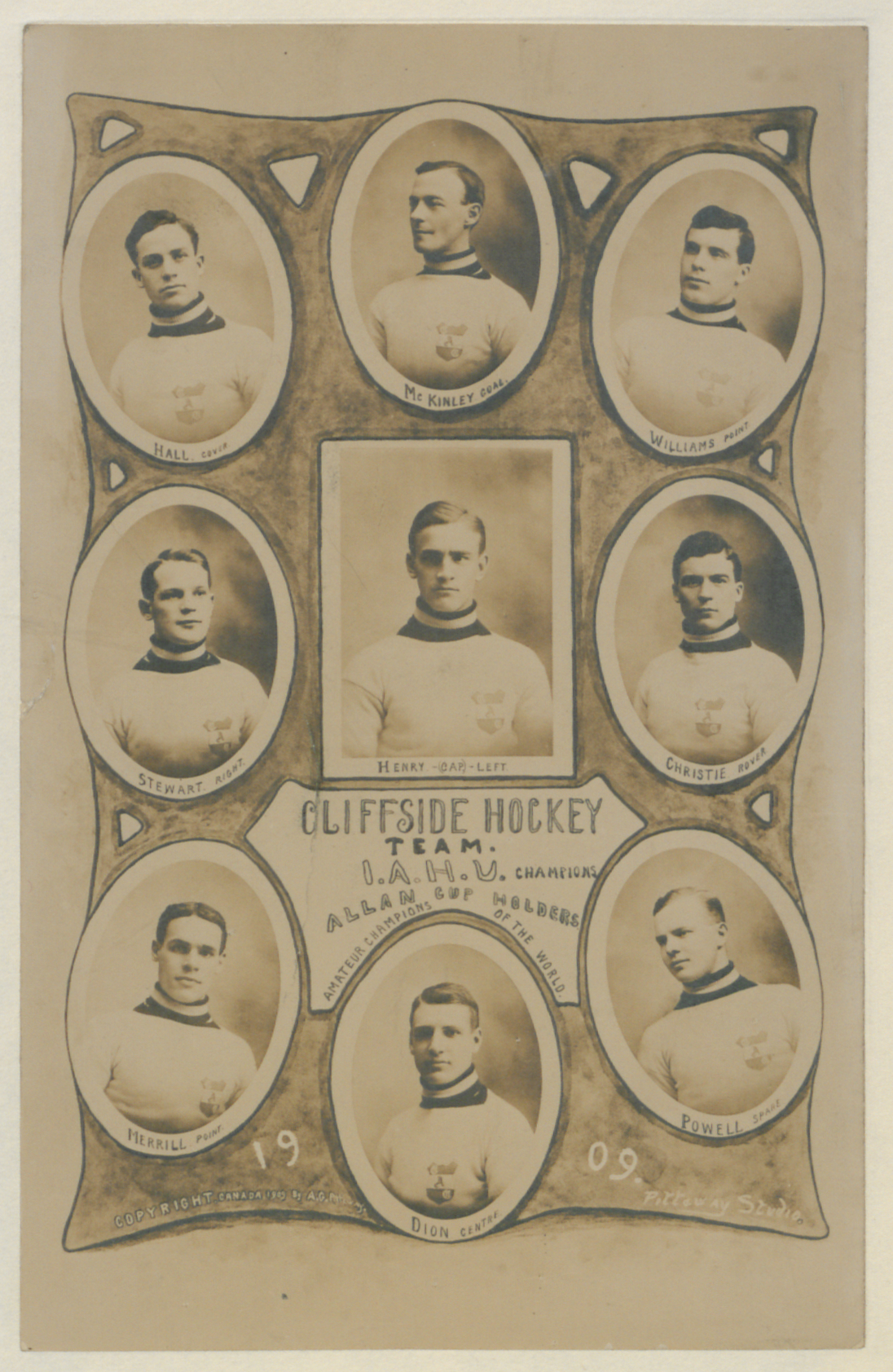
Ottawa Cliffsides in 1909. Dion at center bottom.

Stephen Alphonse "Coo" Dion (December 23, 1886 – April 10, 1959) was a Canadian amateur ice hockey player and soldier. Dion, a rover or a centre forward position wise, played two games for the Ottawa Hockey Club during the 1905–06 ECAHA season, scoring one goal.

== Biography ==
Stephen Dion was born in 1886 in Ottawa, Ontario to Mr. and Mrs. Alfred A. Dion.

=== Ice hockey ===
Between 1905 and 1911 Dion was a member of the Ottawa Cliffsides, famous as the first holders of the Allan Cup as 1909 champions of the IPAHU. He also played two games for the Ottawa Hockey Club during the 1905–06 ECAHA season, scoring one goal, thus being part of the team which held the Stanley Cup in February 1906. Dion was the first player to win both the Stanley Cup and the Allan Cup.

In February 1911 Dion was offered $1,000 by Montreal Canadiens manager George Kennedy to finish off the schedule (8 games) with the NHA club, but he promptly refused the offer claiming he was not for sale. The next season Dion instead joined the Winnipeg Victorias of the Winnipeg Amateur Hockey League, because he had been offered a job with the National Transcontinental Railway. With the Victorias Dion would win his second Allan Cup as the Winnipeg side won the amateur trophy in 1911–12.

During the 1912–13 season Dion played with the Ottawa Stewartons in the IPAHU when another NHA club tried to recruit him. Martin Rosenthal and Pete Green of the Ottawa Hockey Club (Senators) witnessed Dion play in a game with the Stewartons and were so impressed by him that they talked Stewartons president Frank Ahearn into granting them permission to sign Dion, but the player himself still was not interested in turning professional.

=== World War I ===
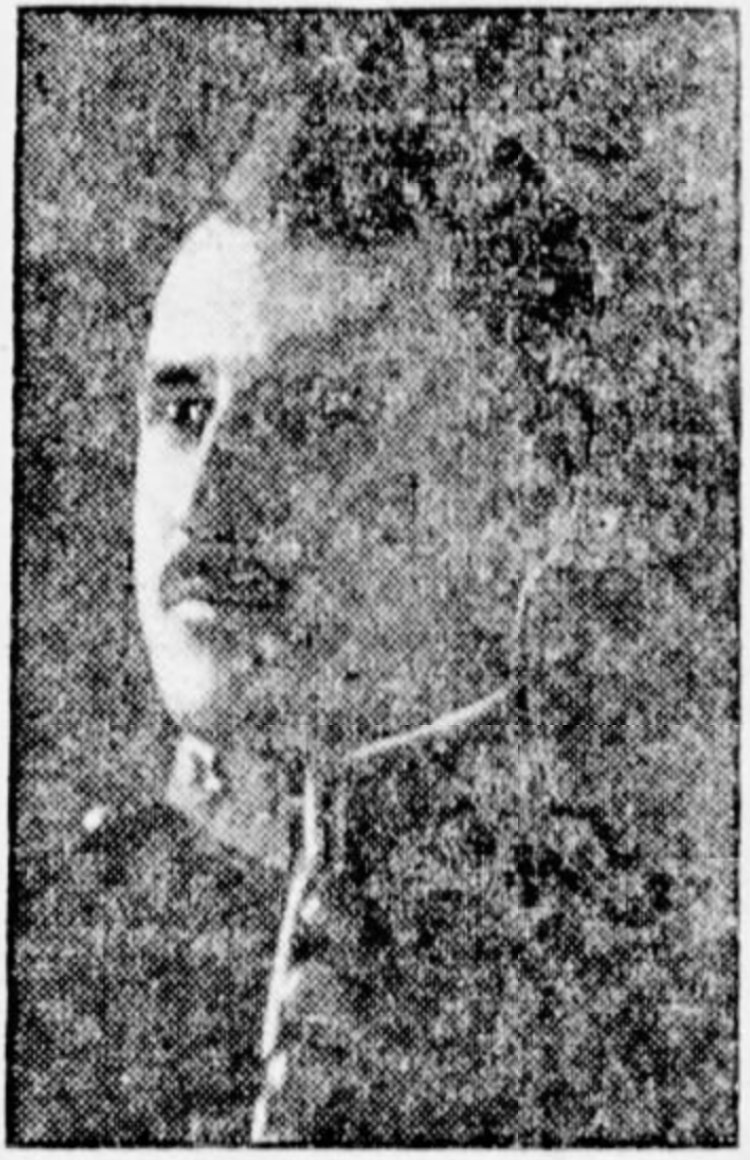
Lieut. Coo Dion.

In 1915 Dion enlisted as a soldier in World War I, where he would hold the rank of Lieutenant. He was severely wounded on May 24 with shattered bones in his left forearm at Festubert in France when hit by bullets. When leaving Europe for Canada on the S/S Hesperian, embarking from Liverpool to Montreal, the ship was hit by a German submarine outside the Irish coast on September 4, 1915. Dion survived but 32 other lives were lost during unsuccessful attempts to tow the liner to port, and the ship eventually sank.

Dion instead reached Canada with the Allan Line steamship Corsican on September 21, 1915.

"I was in charge of a squad of bomb throwers, and we were ordered to steal up to position ’M 9’. This was a barn on a height occupied by the enemy. We crept up on one side of it while the main attack on the position was carried forward from the other side. We got to within 30 yards of the place when our whereabouts were discovered. Two machine guns hidden in the barn opened fire on us, and the party was literally mowed down. We rained bombs into the position, but the party was almost completely wiped out. The position, however, was eventually taken. I received two bullet wounds in the left arm, shattering the bones, and I had to crawl back a mile and a half through a shell swept zone."

— Dion recounting when he was wounded in France during World War I action, from parts of a letter published in the June 15, 1915 issue of the Montreal Daily Star

== Death ==
Dion died in Toronto, Ontario, on April 10, 1959, after a short illness, aged 72.

== Achievements ==
- Stanley Cup – 1906 (Ottawa Hockey Club)
- Allan Cup – 1909 (Ottawa Cliffsides) & 1912 (Winnipeg Victorias)
