= Charlie Snelling =

Canadian ice hockey player

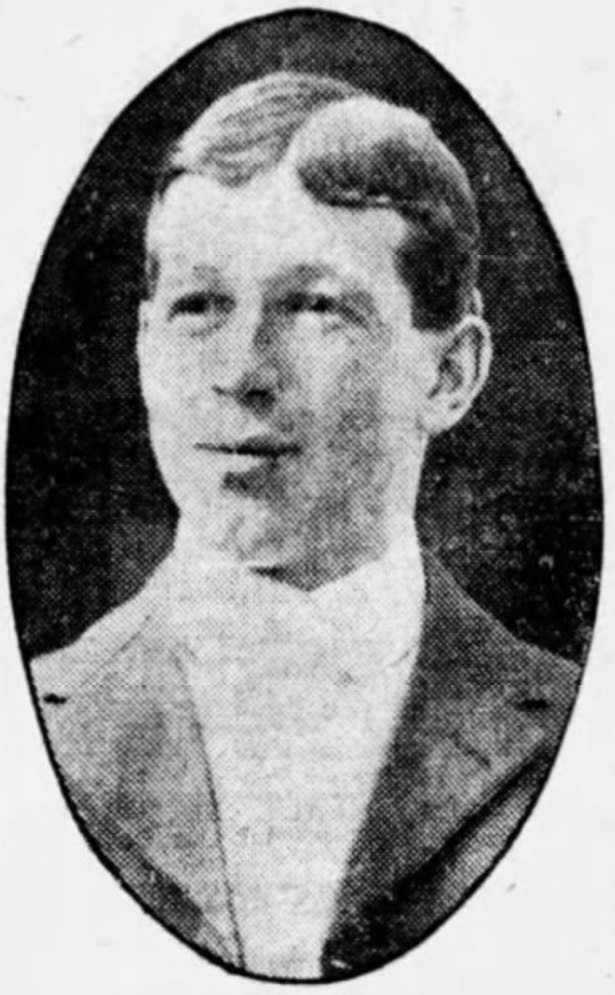
- Born: September 21, 1886 Ottawa, Ontario, Canada
- Died: December 12, 1957 (aged 71) Ottawa, Ontario, Canada
- Height: 5 ft 5 in (165 cm)
- Weight: 169 lb (77 kg; 12 st 1 lb)
- Position: Centre
- Played for: Ottawa New Edinburghs; Ottawa Hockey Club
- Playing career: 1904–1911

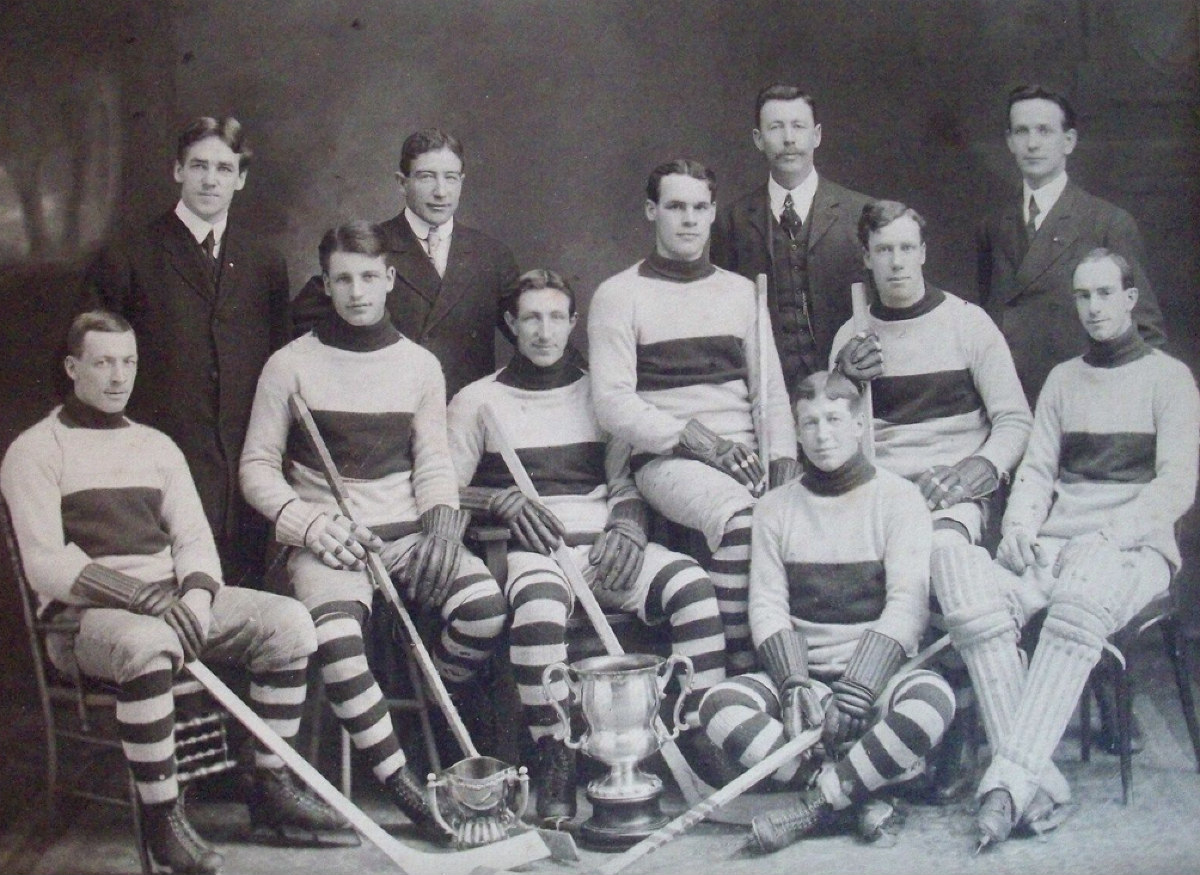
Ottawa New Edinburghs in 1908. Alf Smith is in the back row, second from the left. Players left to right: Guy Boyce, Eddie Gerard, Morley Neate, Horace Merrill, Charlie Snelling, Jack Ryan and Lou Wright.

Charles Bratton Snelling (September 21, 1886 – December 12, 1957) was a Canadian amateur ice hockey centre forward, football player and paddler, primarily active during the first decade of the 1900s. He played ice hockey primarily with the Ottawa New Edinburghs team of the Ottawa City Hockey League and the Interprovincial Amateur Hockey Union, but also one game (scoring three goals) for the Ottawa Hockey Club during the 1907 ECAHA season.

Snelling was the leading goal scorer of the Ottawa City Hockey League in 1910, playing on a forward line alongside future Hockey Hall of Fame defenceman Eddie Gerard (then a winger), with the February 11, 1910 issue of the Ottawa Citizen describing Snelling as "being particularly effective round the nets of the opposing teams."
