= Ottawa New Edinburghs =

- City: Ottawa, Ontario; Canada
- League: Ottawa City Hockey League (1905–1911) (1915–16) (1918–1935); IPAHU (1910–1914)
- Colours: Red, White, Black

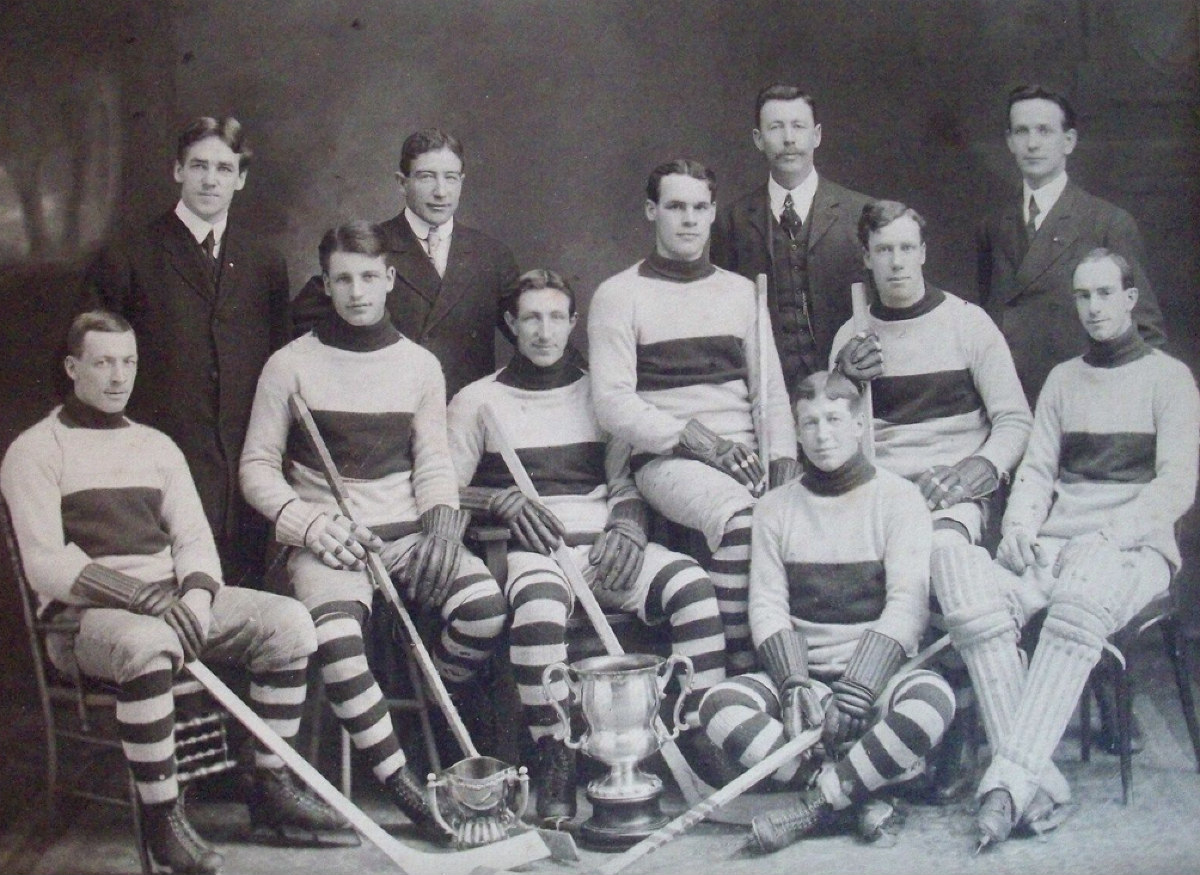
Ottawa New Edinburghs in 1908. Alf Smith is in the back row, second from the left. Players left to right: Guy Boyce, Eddie Gerard, Morley Neate, Horace Merrill, Charlie Snelling, Jack Ryan and Lou Wright.

The Ottawa New Edinburghs (also known as the Ottawa Seconds) were a senior ice hockey team from the New Edinburgh neighbourhood of Ottawa that played in various ice hockey leagues in Canada during the early 1900s, such as the Ottawa City Hockey League and the Interprovincial Amateur Hockey Union. The club was first originated as a canoe club in the 1880s, and the hockey team was often referred to as "the paddlers".

== History ==
The Ottawa New Edinburghs functioned as somewhat of a farm club for the bigger Ottawa Hockey Club/Ottawa Senators franchise (hence the colloquial name "Ottawa Seconds"). A player that went through its ranks was Eddie Gerard who played as a forward for the club for seven years between 1906 and 1913. Gerard would later become an integral member (as a defenceman) on the Ottawa Senators team that won three Stanley Cups between 1920 and 1923. Gerard was inducted into the Hockey Hall of Fame as one of the first nine charter members in 1945.

Another player who took the same route as Gerard was defenceman Horace Merrill who won a Stanley Cup with the Ottawa Senators in 1920, and who was also an accomplished canoeist with the New Edinburghs.

Ottawa New Edinburghs won back to back Interprovincial (IPAHU) honours in 1911 (defeating Grand'Mere) and 1912 (defeating Montreal Victorias).

== Notable players ==
- Eddie Gerard
- Horace Merrill
- Carl Kendall
- Archie Atkinson
- Harry Broadbent
- Gordon Roberts
- Buck Boucher
- Frank Boucher
- Bobby Boucher
- Sammy Hebert
- Aurele Joliat
- Lionel Hitchman
