= 1921 Stanley Cup Final =

1921 ice hockey championship series

	1	2	3	4	5	Total
Ottawa Senators (NHL)	1	4	3	2	2	3
Vancouver Millionaires (PCHA)	3	3	2	3	1	2
- Location(s): Vancouver: Denman Arena
- Format: best-of-five
- Coaches: Ottawa: Pete Green; Vancouver: Frank Patrick
- Captains: Ottawa: Eddie Gerard; Vancouver: Unknown
- Referees: Mickey Ion
- Dates: March 21 – April 4, 1921
- Series-winning goal: Jack Darragh (9:40, second)
- Hall of Famers: Senators: Clint Benedict (1965); Georges Boucher (1960); Punch Broadbent (1962); Sprague Cleghorn (1958); Jack Darragh (1962); Cy Denneny (1959); Eddie Gerard (1945); Frank Nighbor (1947); Millionaires: Jack Adams (1959); Hughie Lehman (1958); Mickey MacKay (1952); Cyclone Taylor (1947); Coaches: Frank Patrick (1950)

The 1921 Stanley Cup Final was contested by the National Hockey League (NHL) champion Ottawa Senators and the Pacific Coast Hockey Association (PCHA) champion Vancouver Millionaires. The Senators defeated Vancouver three games to two in the best-of-five-game series to become the first team to win back-to-back Cup championships since the 1912–13 Quebec Bulldogs.

== Paths to the Finals ==
Ottawa won the first half of the 1920–21 NHL regular season while the Toronto St. Patricks won the second half, setting up a two-game total goals series between the two clubs to determine the NHL title. The Senators recorded 5–0 and 2–0 shutout victories to advance to the Cup final. The first NHL players strike almost took place before the second game when Toronto's players balked at playing extra games. However, team manager Charlie Querrie agreed to give the players a bonus for the playoffs.

Meanwhile, Vancouver finished the 1920–21 PCHA regular season in first place with a 13–11 record, and defeated the second place Seattle Metropolitans in a championship series to win the PCHA title.

== Game summaries ==
The series took place at Vancouver's Denman Arena, where the attendance per game during the series averaged over 10,000 people. The attendance for the first game was 11,000, setting a new world record for the largest crowd to see a hockey game, only to be topped in the fifth game. The Millionaires won games one and four with victories of 3–1 and 3–2, respectively. The Senators were victorious in games two and three with 4–3 and 3–2 wins. Then in the fifth game, Jack Darragh scored both of Ottawa's goals in the 2–1 victory to clinch the Cup.

In game one, played under western rules of seven-men hockey, the Millionaires took a 2–0 lead after the first period on goals by Alf Skinner and Art Duncan. Smokey Harris scored in the second to stretch the lead to 3–0 before Darragh put Ottawa on the board with five minutes to play in the second. The third period was scoreless, giving the first win and the series lead to the Millionaires. Skinner was badly cut in the game and was sent to the hospital.

In game two, played under eastern rules of six-man hockey, the Millionaires took the lead 3–2 after one period on goals by Harris, Duncan and Jack Adams. Ottawa tied it the second on a goal by Darragh. Punch Broadbent scored the winning goal with four minutes to play in the third period.

Game three was again played under western rules. Skinner remained out. Lloyd Cook opened the scoring for Vancouver in the second minute but Darragh countered for Ottawa five minutes later. Ottawa took the lead in the second with goals by Cy Denneny and Sprague Cleghorn before Jack Adams countered for Vancouver seven minutes later. Ottawa held off the Millionaires with a strong defensive third period to win the game and take the series lead.

Game four was played under eastern rules. The first period was scoreless. Skinner put Vancouver ahead early in the second but Boucher tied it up for Ottawa and the teams entered the third period tied 1–1. In the third, Skinner scored again and Cook scored to put Vancouver up by two goals. Broadbent scored for Ottawa a minute later. Vancouver held off the Senators to win the game and tie the series.

In the fifth and deciding game, it was estimated that 12,000 attended and 3,000 were turned away. Skinner scored to put Vancouver up 1–0 after the first period. Darragh scored twice for Ottawa in the second period to put the Senators ahead with one period to play. With two minutes to play, Cook was body-checked by Eddie Gerard and retaliated. Cleghorn then decked Cook with a punch to the jaw and a free-for-all broke out, only ended by the police going onto the ice. The three were penalized and Ottawa finished the game with five players, while Vancouver finished with six. Ottawa held on to win the game 2–1 and the series and retained the championship. After the game, the teams exchanged sweaters and much of the Ottawas' equipment was taken away by souvenir hunters.

Darragh led the Senators in scoring with five goals during the series, while goaltender Clint Benedict only allowed just 12 goals in the five games, earning a 2.40 goals-against average. Since all games were played in Vancouver, the three wins by the Senators meant they were the first team to win three road games in a Final series. Darragh had had to get special permission from his job with Ottawa Dairy Company, at the request of Ottawa mayor Frank H. Plant, to play in the final. Alf Skinner led the scoring for Vancouver with four goals. It was the final Stanley Cup series for Cyclone Taylor.

Vancouver coach Frank Patrick remarked after the series: "You have the greatest team I have ever saw. Ottawa ought to be proud of those boys. Their defensive system is marvellous. They are better than the 'Little Men of Iron', the 'Silver Seven' or any other sextet I have ever watched. It was no disgrace to lose to that aggregation."

March 21	Ottawa Senators	1–3	Vancouver Millionaires	Denman Arena	Recap
No scoring		First period	15:40 - Alf Skinner (1); 18:15 - Art Duncan (1)
Jack Darragh (1) - 15:55		Second period	1:20 - Smokey Harris (1)
No scoring		Third period	No scoring
Clint Benedict		Goalie stats	Hugh Lehman

March 24	Ottawa Senators	4–3	Vancouver Millionaires	Denman Arena	Recap
Buck Boucher (4) - 8:05; Cy Denneny (3) - 18:26		First period	1:29 - Smokey Harris (2); 3:01 - Jack Adams (1); 10:29 - Art Duncan (1)
Jack Darragh (2) - 10:49		Second period	No scoring
Punch Broadbent (1) - pp - 16:40		Third period	No scoring
Clint Benedict		Goalie stats	Hugh Lehman

March 28	Ottawa Senators	3–2	Vancouver Millionaires	Denman Arena	Recap
Jack Darragh (3) - 8:57		First period	1:59 - Lloyd Cook (1)
Cy Denneny (4) - sh - 8:22; Sprague Cleghorn (1) - 10:52		Second period	18:02 - Jack Adams (2)
No scoring		Third period	No scoring
Clint Benedict		Goalie stats	Hugh Lehman

March 31	Ottawa Senators	2–3	Vancouver Millionaires	Denman Arena	Recap
No scoring		First period	No scoring
Buck Boucher (5) - 13:43		Second period	2:22 - Alf Skinner (2)
Punch Broadbent (2) - 16:52		Third period	1:35 - Alf Skinner (3); 15:52 - pp - Lloyd Cook (2)
Clint Benedict		Goalie stats	Hugh Lehman

April 4	Ottawa Senators	2–1	Vancouver Millionaires	Denman Arena	Recap
No scoring		First period	16:26 - Alf Skinner (4)
Jack Darragh (4) - 7:27; Jack Darragh (5) - 9:40		Second period	No scoring
No scoring		Third period	No scoring
Clint Benedict		Goalie stats	Hugh Lehman

Ottawa won series 3–2

== Stanley Cup engraving ==
The 1921 Stanley Cup was presented by the trophy's trustee William Foran. The Senators never did engrave their name on the Cup for their championship season.

It was not until the trophy was redesigned in 1948 that the words "1921 Ottawa Senators" was put onto its then-new collar.

The following Senators players and staff were members of the Stanley Cup winning team.

1920–21 Ottawa Senators

=== Players ===
Centres

- 9 Frank Nighbor

Wingers

- 3 Jack MacKell^
- 6 Leth Graham
- 7 Jack Darragh
- 5 Eddie Gerard (Captain)^
- 8 Cy Denneny
- 9 Harry Punch Broadbent

Defencemen

- 2 Sprague Cleghorn
- 4 George Buck Boucher‡
- 10 Morley Bruce
- 11 Horace Merrill (Did not play on team picture)

Goaltenders

- 1 Clint Benedict

=== Coaching and administrative staff ===
- Edwin Ted Dey (President/Owner)
- Tommy Gorman (Manager/Secretary)
- Pete Green (Coach)
- Frank Dolan (Trainer)
- Frank Ahearn, (Hon. President/Owner)&
- Every member of the 1921 Stanley Cup-winning team was included on the team picture except Thomas Frank Ahrean, Hon. President and Leth Graham.
- ‡ Played Rover a position in the Stanley Cup Final. ^ also played Defence
- & Missing from the team picture

Just like the previous season, the Senators never engraved their name on the Cup for their 1921 championship. It was not until the trophy was redesigned in 1948 that the words "1921 Ottawa Senators" was put onto its then-new collar.

== See also ==
- 1920–21 NHL season
- 1920–21 PCHA season

Preceded by Ottawa Senators; 1920	Ottawa Senators; Stanley Cup champions 1921	Succeeded by Toronto St. Pats; 1922
