= Charles Snelling =

Charles Snelling may refer to:

- Charles Snelling (figure skater), Canadian and Olympic figure skater
- Charlie Snelling (1886–1957), Canadian amateur ice hockey player and paddler
- Charles Mercer Snelling (1862–1939), chancellor of the University of Georgia and the University System of Georgia
