= Archie Atkinson =

Archie Atkinson may refer to:

- Archie Atkinson (cyclist) (born 2004), British paralympic cyclist
- Archie Atkinson (ice hockey) (1886–1968), Canadian ice hockey player
