= Clint Benedict =

Canadian ice hockey player (1892–1976)

- Hockey Hall of Fame, 1965
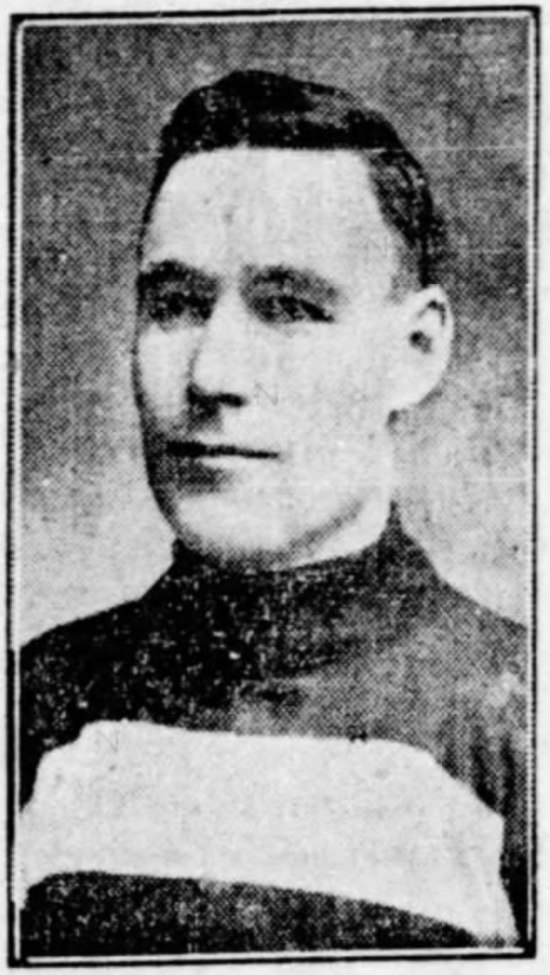
- Born: September 26, 1892 Ottawa, Ontario, Canada
- Died: November 12, 1976 (aged 84) Ottawa, Ontario, Canada
- Height: 6 ft 0 in (183 cm)
- Weight: 165 lb (75 kg; 11 st 11 lb)
- Position: Goaltender
- Caught: Left
- Played for: Ottawa Senators; Montreal Maroons
- Playing career: 1912–1931

Clinton Stevenson "Praying Benny" Benedict (September 26, 1892 – November 12, 1976) was a Canadian professional lacrosse goalie, ice hockey goaltender who played for the Ottawa Senators and the Montreal Maroons. He played on four Stanley Cup-winning squads. He was the first goaltender in the National Hockey League (NHL) to wear a face mask. He led league goaltenders in shutouts seven times over his professional career. He is a member of the Hockey Hall of Fame.

Benedict played for the Ottawa Stars Lacrosse Club, winning the City Championship in 1911. He later played professionally with the Ottawa Capitals Lacrosse Club earning distinction for his tenacity under fire. This helped him immeasurably in his transition into professional hockey.

Benedict was one of the first great goalies in professional hockey and a great innovator in the sport. He was the first goalie to drop to his knees to stop the puck along the ice; at the time, dropping to the ice was illegal. This earned him the nickname "Praying Benny." The first rule change the NHL made legalized his playing style.

== Playing career ==
Benedict played senior-level hockey at 17, playing for the Ottawa Stewartons of the Ottawa City Hockey League in 1909–10, moving to the Ottawa New Edinburghs of the Interprovincial Amateur Hockey Union (IPAHU) the following season. Benedict joined the Ottawa Senators of the National Hockey Association (NHA) in the 1912–13 season. Although the Senators had at the time future Hockey Hall of Famer Percy LeSueur as their starting goaltender, Benedict played 10 games for the club. During the 1912–13 season he was also manager Art Ross' goaltender of choice for the NHA All-Stars, a team which played in five exhibition games against the PCHA All-Stars, losing three games to two.

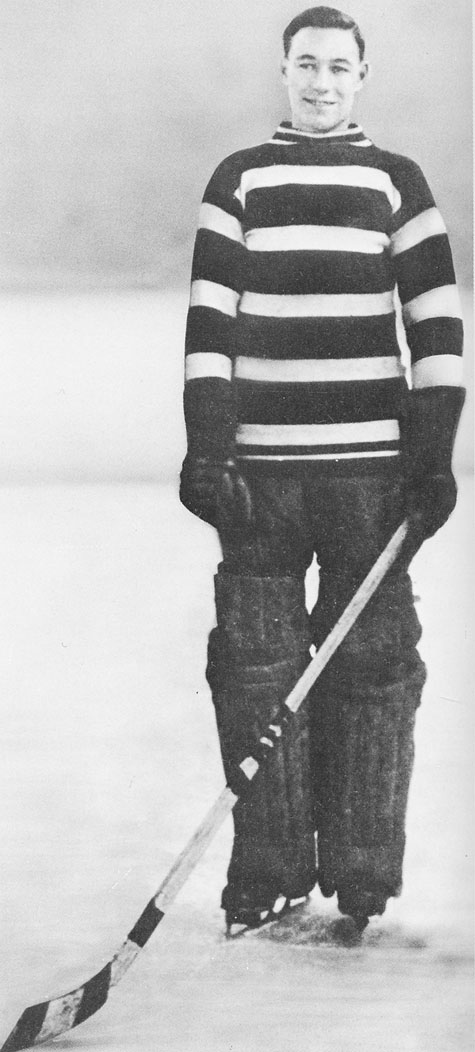
Benedict with the Ottawa Senators.

Benedict played one more season as backup to LeSueur, in 1913–14, and took over as starting goaltender in the 1914–15 season. He led the league in goals against average (GAA) that season and the following two seasons to start his career. He played 12 seasons overall for the Senators, five in the NHA and seven in the NHL.

After winning three Stanley Cups with the Senators, his career changed in the 1923–24 season. Benedict developed a problem with drinking, which at first was kept secret by the Senators. Benedict occasionally played for the Senators while under the effects. In the playoffs, Benedict and the Senators played poorly and were quickly eliminated. Management withheld some of his salary for his behaviour. Benedict sued the team in return and the Senators countersued, revealing in court documents the extent of Benedict's behaviour. Once the Ottawa papers found out about the court case, the secret was out. The two sides quickly settled to minimize the publicity.

Benedict's career with the Senators was finished. On October 20, 1924, Benedict was traded along with Punch Broadbent to the expansion Montreal Maroons. It was a new lease on life for Benedict who played for six seasons with the Maroons. In 1926, he won another Stanley Cup with the Maroons after having recorded three shutouts in the Stanley Cup Final against the Victoria Cougars.

In 1930, some 30 years before Jacques Plante popularized the goalie mask, Clint was the first goalie to wear facial protection in the NHL with the Montreal Maroons using it for five games during the 1929–30 season. On January 7, 1930, he was hit by a shot from Howie Morenz in the face, breaking the bridge of his nose. Benedict was out of action for six weeks. He returned on February 20, 1930 against the New York Americans wearing the mask. He played with a mask for five games in total and according to author Douglas Hunter, Benedict modified or tried different masks during the sequence of games. His last game wearing a mask was on March 4, 1930 when he got hit in the face during a goal-mouth scramble. He had to leave the game due to blood coming from his nose. When asked about his short-lived face mask Benedict remarked:

It was leather with a big nosepiece. The nosepiece proved to be the problem, because it obscured my vision.

The game against Ottawa was his last game in the NHL. In June 1930, Benedict was placed on waivers. The next season, he played for the Windsor Bulldogs senior hockey team, the Maroons farm team, leading them to the IHL championship. In 1932, Benedict became manager and coach of Saint John Beavers of the Maritime Senior Hockey League, a position he held for two seasons. Benedict was inducted into the Hockey Hall of Fame in 1965, much later than would be expected of a player of his ability and career and possibly due to the events of 1924. Benedict lived to 84 years of age, dying in 1976 in Ottawa.

== Career statistics ==
=== Regular season and playoffs ===
			Regular season								Playoffs
Season	Team	League	GP	W	L	T	Min	GA	SO	GAA	GP	W	L	T	Min	GA	SO	GAA
1909–10	Ottawa Stewartons	OCHL	7	5	2	0	420	21	0	3.00	1	0	1	0	60	2	0	2.00
1910–11	Ottawa New Edinburghs	IPAHU	5	5	0	0	300	18	0	3.60	3	3	0	0	180	13	0	4.25
1910–11	Ottawa Stewartons	OCHL	6	2	3	1	360	24	0	4.00	—	—	—	—	—	—	—	—
1911–12	Ottawa New Edinburghs	IPAHU	11	11	0	0	657	34	0	3.11	4	3	1	0	237	18	0	4.56
1912–13	Ottawa Senators	NHA	10	7	2	1	275	16	1	3.49	—	—	—	—	—	—	—	—
1912–13	NHA All-Stars	Exh.	5	2	3	0	300	30	0	6.00	—	—	—	—	—	—	—	—
1913–14	Ottawa Senators	NHA	9	5	3	0	474	29	0	3.67	—	—	—	—	—	—	—	—
1914–15	Ottawa Senators	NHA	20	14	6	0	1243	65	0	3.14	2	1	1	0	120	2	1	1.00
1914–15	Ottawa Senators	St-Cup	—	—	—	—	—	—	—	—	3	0	3	—	180	26	0	8.67
1915–16	Ottawa Senators	NHA	24	13	11	0	1447	72	1	2.99	—	—	—	—	—	—	—	—
1916–17	Ottawa Senators	NHA	18	14	4	0	1103	50	1	2.72	2	1	1	0	120	7	0	3.50
1917–18	Ottawa Senators	NHL	22	9	13	0	1337	114	1	5.12	—	—	—	—	—	—	—	—
1918–19	Ottawa Senators	NHL	18	12	6	0	1152	53	2	2.76	5	1	4	0	300	26	0	5.20
1919–20	Ottawa Senators	NHL	24	19	5	0	1443	64	5	2.66	—	—	—	—	—	—	—	—
1919–20	Ottawa Senators	St-Cup	—	—	—	—	—	—	—	—	5	3	2	—	300	11	1	2.20
1920–21	Ottawa Senators	NHL	24	14	10	0	1462	75	2	3.08	2	2	0	0	120	0	2	0.00
1920–21	Ottawa Senators	St-Cup	—	—	—	—	—	—	—	—	5	3	2	—	300	12	0	2.40
1921–22	Ottawa Senators	NHL	24	14	8	2	1510	84	2	3.34	2	0	1	1	120	5	1	2.50
1922–23	Ottawa Senators	NHL	24	14	9	1	1486	54	4	2.18	2	1	1	0	120	2	1	1.00
1922–23	Ottawa Senators	St-Cup	—	—	—	—	—	—	—	—	6	5	1	—	361	8	1	1.33
1923–24	Ottawa Senators	NHL	22	15	7	0	1356	45	3	1.99	2	0	2	0	120	5	0	2.50
1924–25	Montreal Maroons	NHL	30	9	19	2	1843	65	2	2.12	—	—	—	—	—	—	—	—
1925–26	Montreal Maroons	NHL	36	20	11	5	2288	73	6	1.91	4	2	0	2	240	5	1	1.25
1925–26	Montreal Maroons	St-Cup	—	—	—	—	—	—	—	—	4	3	1	—	240	3	3	0.75
1926–27	Montreal Maroons	NHL	43	20	19	4	2748	65	13	1.42	2	0	1	1	132	2	0	0.91
1927–28	Montreal Maroons	NHL	44	24	14	6	2690	76	7	1.70	9	5	3	1	555	8	4	0.86
1928–29	Montreal Maroons	NHL	37	14	16	7	2300	57	11	1.49	—	—	—	—	—	—	—	—
1929–30	Montreal Maroons	NHL	14	6	6	1	752	38	0	3.03	—	—	—	—	—	—	—	—
1930–31	Windsor Bulldogs	IHL	40	20	15	5	2478	92	1	2.23	—	—	—	—	—	—	—	—
St-Cup totals			—	—	—	—	—	—	—	—	23	14	9	—	1381	60	5	2.61
NHA totals			81	53	26	1	4542	232	3	3.06	4	2	2	0	240	9	1	2.25
NHL totals			362	190	143	28	22,367	863	57	2.32	28	11	12	5	1707	53	9	1.86

== Awards and achievements ==
- 1965 – Inducted into the Hockey Hall of Fame
- 1966 – Named All-Star goaltender for the time period 1893–1926 by NHL historian Charles Coleman
- 1966 – Inducted into Ottawa Sports Hall of Fame
- 1998 – Ranked number 77 on The Hockey News' list of the 100 Greatest Hockey Players.
