= Carl Kendall =

Canadian ice hockey player

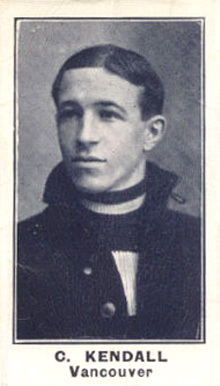
- 1912 hockey card of Kendall
- Born: August 9, 1890 Charlemagne, Quebec, Canada
- Died: September 20, 1975 (aged 85) Penticton, British Columbia, Canada
- Height: 5 ft 6 in (168 cm)
- Weight: 170 lb (77 kg; 12 st 2 lb)
- Position: Centre
- Shot: Left
- Played for: Vancouver Millionaires; Montreal Wanderers; Ottawa Senators; Trail Smoke Eaters
- Playing career: 1907–1932

Carroll Dudley Kendall (August 9, 1890 – September 20, 1975), was a Canadian professional ice hockey player who played in various professional and amateur leagues, including the Pacific Coast Hockey Association (PCHA) and National Hockey Association (NHA). Amongst the teams he played with were the Vancouver Millionaires, Montreal Wanderers and Ottawa Senators.

He died in 1975.

== Career ==
Kendall came up through the ranks of the Ottawa New Edinburghs and played for the club in the Ottawa City Hockey League and the Interprovincial Amateur Hockey Union between 1910 and 1912.

In 1912 he went west to play for the Vancouver Millionaires in the Pacific Coast Hockey Association. During the 1912–13 PCHA season he finished tied second in goal scoring in the PCHA with 14 goals in 14 games.

Prior to the 1913–14 season Kendall was involved in a trade carousel with Ottawa Senators player Skene Ronan. Vancouver Millionaires manager Frank Patrick first traded Kendall to the Senators in exchange for Ronan, but Ronan refused to report to Vancouver and was suspended from playing in the upcoming season. Patrick then instead sold Kendall's rights to the Montreal Wanderers which meant that Ronan reverted to the Ottawa Senators.

In 1915–16 he was a hold-out and did not play for the Montreal Wanderers, and in 1916–17 he instead signed with the Ottawa Senators.

== Statistics ==
=== Regular season and playoffs ===
			Regular season					Playoffs
Season	Team	League	GP	G	A	Pts	PIM	GP	G	A	Pts	PIM
1912–13	Vancouver Millionaires	PCHA	14	14	6	20	21	–	–	–	–	–
	PCHA All-Stars	Exh.	5	5	0	5	0	–	–	–	–	–
1913–14	Montreal Wanderers	NHA	18	10	8	18	19	–	–	–	–	–
1914–15	Montreal Wanderers	NHA	8	0	0	0	0	–	–	–	–	–
1915–16	Did not play (suspended)		–	–	–	–	–	–	–	–	–	–
1916–17	Ottawa Senators	NHA	11	2	0	2	0	–	–	–	–	–
NHA totalt			37	12	8	20	19	–	–	–	–	–
