= 1909 Allan Cup =

Canadian senior ice hockey championship

The Allan Cup trophy

The 1909 Allan Cup was the Canadian senior ice hockey championship for the 1908–09 season. The event was hosted by the Ottawa Cliffsides in Ottawa, Ontario. The 1909 playoff marked the first and second time that the Allan Cup was awarded.

== The first champion ==
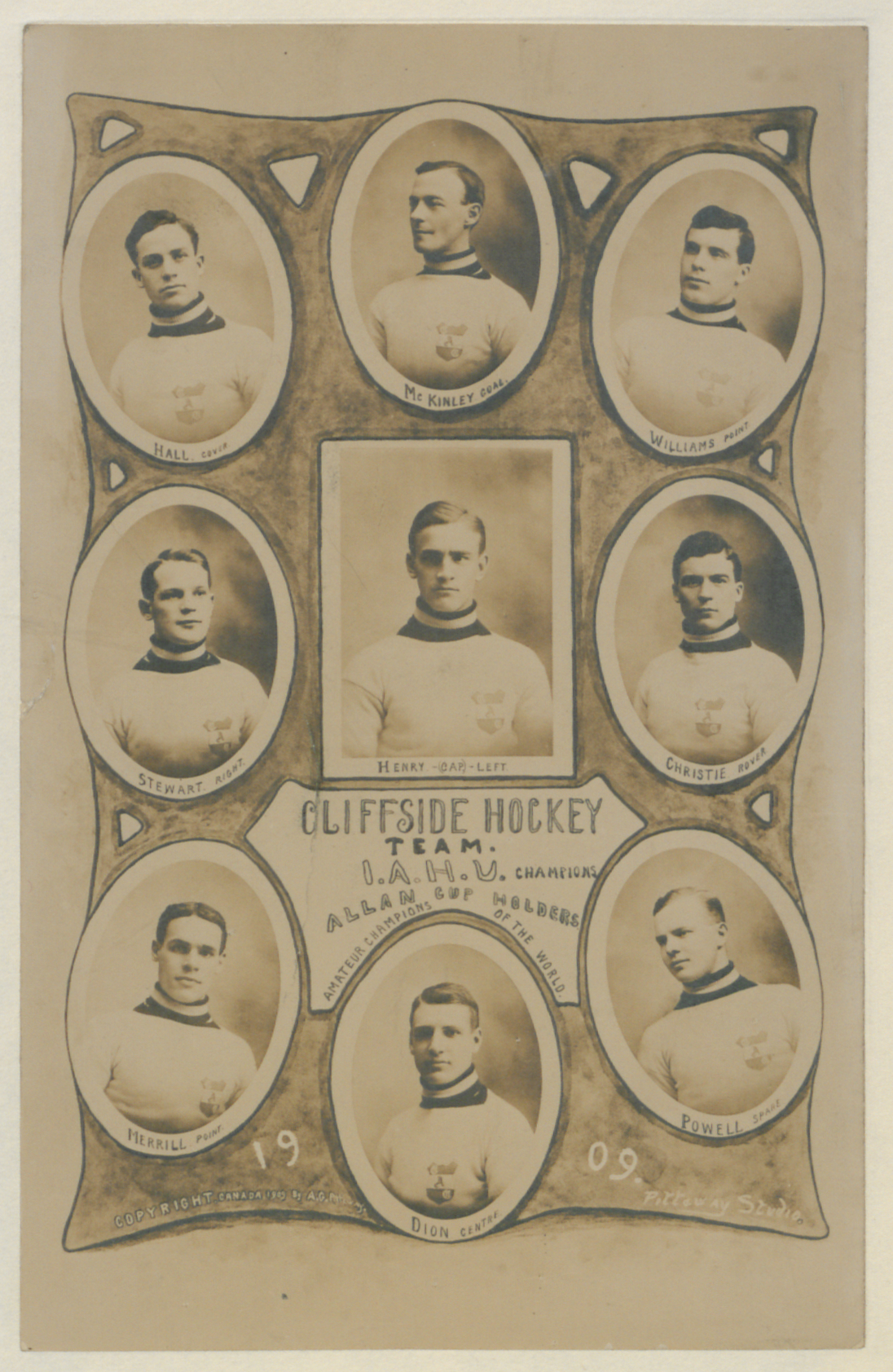
Ottawa Cliffsides in 1909.

Sir H. Montagu Allan gave the Allan Cup to the Victoria Hockey Club of Montreal to give to the 1909 champion of their league, the Inter-Provincial Amateur Hockey Union. The Ottawa Cliffsides won the IAHU championship, surpassing the Montreal Victorias with a 5-1-0 record (Montreal was 4-2-0) to win the league title and be awarded the Allan Cup on March 6, 1909.

One week later, the first challenge was played, with the Intercollegiate league champion Queen's University challenging Ottawa to a single-game playoff. Queen's won the game and took over the Allan Cup championship.

A second challenge was received, from St. Michael's College, the Ontario Hockey Association (OHA) senior champion, but the trustees ruled that it was too late in the season to play.

== The first challenge ==
- Ottawa Cliffsides (Allan Cup holder)
- Queen's University (Challenger)

=== Result ===
Queen's University 5 - Ottawa Cliffsides 4

Queen's University of Kingston, Ontario wins the Allan Cup.
