= Horace Merrill =

Canadian ice hockey player

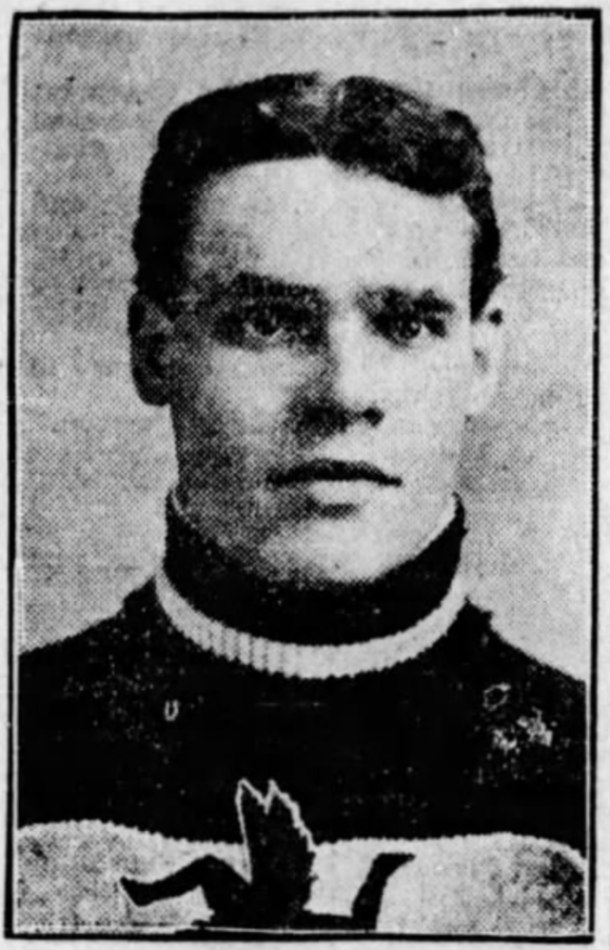
- Born: November 30, 1884 Toronto, Ontario, Canada
- Died: December 24, 1958 (aged 74) Ottawa, Ontario, Canada
- Height: 5 ft 9 in (175 cm)
- Weight: 176 lb (80 kg; 12 st 8 lb)
- Position: Defence
- Shot: Left
- Played for: Ottawa Senators
- Playing career: 1907–1920

Horace Jefferson Merrill (November 30, 1884 – December 24, 1958) was a Canadian professional ice hockey player with the Ottawa Senators in both the National Hockey Association and National Hockey League from 1912 to 1920. He won the Stanley Cup with Ottawa in 1920. He was born in Toronto, but lived most of his life in Ottawa. Merrill was also an accomplished canoeist, holding the Canadian title from 1907 until 1909 in a single canoe.

== Playing career ==
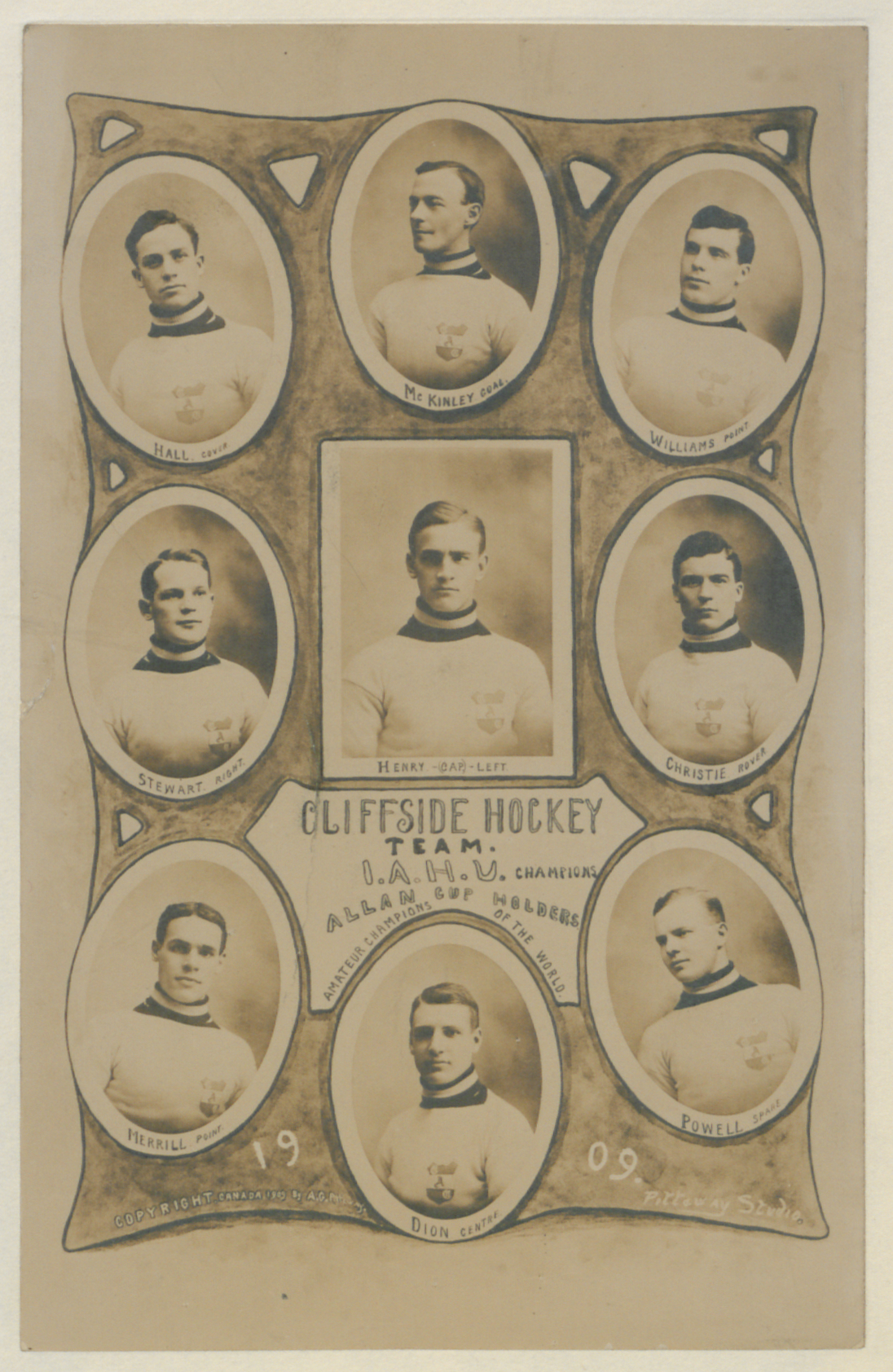
Merrill, at bottom left, with the Ottawa Cliffsides in 1909.

Born in Toronto, Ontario, Merrill moved to Ottawa, Ontario at an early age. By 1907, Merrill was playing senior-level hockey with the Ottawa Seconds of the Ottawa City Hockey League. The following year he also started playing for the Ottawa Cliffsides and was a member of their Allan Cup-winning squad in 1909. By 1912, he joined the Ottawa Senators of the National Hockey Association (NHA). He stayed with the Senators as they joined the National Hockey League in 1917, playing 9 games over 2 seasons until his retirement in 1920.

== Canoeing ==
Merrill was an outstanding paddler in the decade 1902–1912. He was a member of the Rideau Canoe Club’s first war canoe crew in 1902. Paddling for Ottawa Canoe Club (OCC) in 1904 he won the senior singles in the Canadian Canoe Association (CCA) competition. By 1906 he had switched to the New Edinburgh Canoe Club (NECC) and took second place in the senior singles at the CCA championship. In 1908 and 1909 he took the title as Canadian senior singles champion. In 1908, 1909, and 1910 he led the NECC war canoe crew to second place finishes in the half-mile Canadian championships. The crew came second in the mile race in 1908 and finished first in 1909, 1910, and 1911. In 1912 he served as rear commodore of the CCA.

== Personal life ==
Merrill retired to live and marry in Ottawa. He became the president of the Dadson-Merrill Press Company until he retired from that business in 1945. He also served as a school trustee. In 1958, he suffered a stroke on an automobile trip to Florida with his wife, while driving through Cortland, New York, and was returned to Ottawa on December 19, 1958. He died a week later and is buried in Ottawa at Beechwood cemetery along with numerous other Senators players.

== Career statistics ==
=== Regular season and playoffs ===
			Regular season					Playoffs
Season	Team	League	GP	G	A	Pts	PIM	GP	G	A	Pts	PIM
1907–08	Ottawa Seconds	OCHL	7	5	0	5	—	—	—	—	—	—
1908–09	Ottawa Cliffsides	IPAHU	1	0	0	0	0	1	0	0	0	0
1908–09	Ottawa Seconds	OCHL	5	0	0	0	0	2	0	0	0	0
1909–10	Ottawa Seconds	OCHL	7	3	0	3	20	1	0	0	0	0
1909–10	Ottawa Seconds	Al-Cup	—	—	—	—	—	2	1	0	1	0
1910–11	Ottawa New Edinburghs	IPAHU	5	3	0	3	6	3	1	0	1	0
1911–12	Ottawa New Edinburghs	IPAHU	9	8	0	8	6	3	2	0	2	0
1912–13	Ottawa Senators	NHA	10	5	0	5	4	—	—	—	—	—
1913–14	Ottawa Senators	NHA	18	3	3	6	29	—	—	—	—	—
1914–15	Ottawa Senators	NHA	20	3	0	3	32	5	1	0	1	0
1915–16	Ottawa Senators	NHA	24	4	1	5	25	—	—	—	—	—
1916–17	Ottawa Senators	NHA	19	1	2	3	12	2	0	0	0	3
1917–18	Ottawa Senators	NHL	4	0	0	0	3	—	—	—	—	—
1919–20	Ottawa Senators	NHA	5	0	0	0	0	—	—	—	—	—
NHA totals			91	16	6	22	102	7	1	0	1	3
NHL totals			9	0	0	0	3	—	—	—	—	—

Preceded by Jack Darragh	Ottawa Senators captain (Original Era); 1915–16	Succeeded by Eddie Gerard
