= Ottawa City Hockey League =

- Sport: Ice hockey
- Founded: 1890
- Folded: 1945 (senior); 1957 (junior)
- Country: Canada

The Ottawa City Hockey League (OCHL) was an amateur ice hockey league with junior, intermediate and senior level men's teams in Ottawa, Canada. Founded in 1890 by the local Ottawa Hockey Association (Ottawa HA), the OCHL was created to organize play within the city of Ottawa. It is considered the second ice hockey league to form in Canada.

The senior league operated until 1945 and the junior league operated until 1957. Today the Ottawa region is administered by Hockey Eastern Ontario (HEO).

== History ==
=== OCHL, OHA, AHAC and Stanley Cup ===
The local Ottawa Hockey Association (Ottawa HA) created the OCHL with five teams for its first season:

- Ottawa Hockey Club (future Stanley Cup champion Ottawa "Silver Sevens/Senators") owned in the beginning by the Ottawa HA itself
- Rideau Hall Rebels
- Dey's Rink (Dey's Rink Pirates)
- Ottawa College Garnet and Greys
- Ottawa Capitals - Ottawa Capitals Lacrosse Club

Source: Montreal Gazette

The founding meeting was held on November 25, 1890, at the Ottawa Amateur Athletic Association. Each club paid CA$3 for the purchase of a pair of championship flags. The clubs agreed to follow the rules of the Amateur Hockey Association of Canada (AHAC), play only once per week, players can only play for one team unless permitted otherwise, and play each other no more than two times.

The Ottawa HA's Ottawa Hockey Club had existed for some time, forming to compete in the 1884 Montreal Winter Carnival ice hockey tournament (considered the Canadian championship at the time), later competing in the challenge-based (rather than regularly scheduled) Amateur Hockey Association of Canada. Ottawa HC was the dominant team in the OCHL, winning the OCHL's inaugural and consecutive league championships.

In the early days, the OCHL had a relationship with the geographically larger Ontario Hockey Association (OHA), which also formed in 1890. The OCHL champion would compete for the OHA Championship at the end of each season. As OCHL champion, Ottawa HA's own Ottawa Hockey Club were the representatives to – and winners of – the OHA Championship in 1890, 1891, 1892 and 1893. Ottawa HC made the costly trip to Toronto for both the 1892 and 1893 OHA finals, so the OCHL requested that the 1894 OHA Championship game be held in Ottawa. When the OHA refused, the OCHL resigned from the OHA and since that time the Greater Ottawa area (now including Southwestern Quebec) has operated separately from the OHA which organizes amateur hockey for most of Ontario.

The OHA had been founded based on an idea of Arthur Stanley, son of the Governor General of Canada, the Lord Stanley of Preston. After the OCHL's Ottawa Hockey Club won its third consecutive OHA championship, Lord Stanley signaled the creation of today's Stanley Cup by sending the following message to the victory celebration held on March 18, 1892, at Ottawa's Russell Hotel:

I have for some time been thinking that it would be a good thing if there were a challenge cup which should be held from year to year by the champion hockey team in the Dominion (of Canada).

There does not appear to be any such outward sign of a championship at present, and considering the general interest which matches now elicit, and the importance of having the game played fairly and under rules generally recognized, I am willing to give a cup which shall be held from year to year by the winning team.

I am not quite certain that the present regulations governing the arrangement of matches give entire satisfaction, and it would be worth considering whether they could not be arranged so that each team would play once at home and once at the place where their opponents hail from.

Ottawa HC repeated as OCHL and OHA Champions in 1893, and competed in the challenge-based, rather than schedule-based, Amateur Hockey Association of Canada (AHAC). The AHAC's Montreal Hockey Club defeated Ottawa HC in a mid-season challenge, and were awarded the first Stanley Cup.

=== Competing Ottawa League and CAHL ===
Like the creation of the Stanley Cup, teams and leagues in Ottawa would influence other aspects of the creation of modern hockey.

While the Ottawa HA was the driving force (and a team owner) behind the OCHL, a rival sports association would appear in Ottawa in the 1890s. The Capital Hockey Association (Capital HA) helped found the Central Canada Hockey Association (CCHA) league. Like the Ottawa HA, Capital HA owned a franchise – the Ottawa Capitals – in its own league. Like the Ottawa HA, the Capital HA's team would be the dominant club in their own league, challenging for the Stanley Cup in 1897.

The Capital HA attempted to have their Capitals join the Ottawa HC in the senior AHAC in 1897 and again in 1898. When the Capitals were granted membership by the AHAC executive in 1898, Ottawa HC and the rest of the AHAC teams resigned and formed the Canadian Amateur Hockey League (CAHL).

=== Creation of Ottawa District Hockey Association ===
In 1914, the Canadian Amateur Hockey Association(CAHA) was formed, and Ottawa's associations (including OCHL and CCHA) were placed under the Quebec Amateur Hockey Association. Attempts to form a separate organization from Quebec took several years. In 1919, in a ruling from the CAHA, the rival Capital HA's CCHA teams were forced to join the OCHL, ending the feud that had caused the dissolution of the AHAC in 1898.

The OCHL became the sole senior league for the district, ending the CCHA. In 1920, the Ottawa District Hockey Association (ODHA) was formed to oversee Ottawa hockey, and in 1921, was granted membership in the CAHA. The City League continued to exist as the senior league of Ottawa and district. The ODHA is known today as Hockey Eastern Ontario.

During World War II, the league admitted senior teams from the armed forces stationed at Ottawa. These teams, which had NHL players, were temporary, but would enter championship play and several won the Canadian Allan Cup amateur senior men's ice hockey championship. The famous 'Kraut Line' of the Boston Bruins played for the Ottawa RCAF Flyers and won the Allan Cup. This was the last hurrah of the City League, which folded after the war and league play was re-organized under the auspices of the ODHA.

Many famous players have graduated from, or played in the league, including Punch Broadbent, Eddie Gerard, King Clancy, Bill Cowley, Syd Howe, Aurel Joliat, Frank McGee, Ken Reardon and Milt Schmidt.

== Senior champions ==
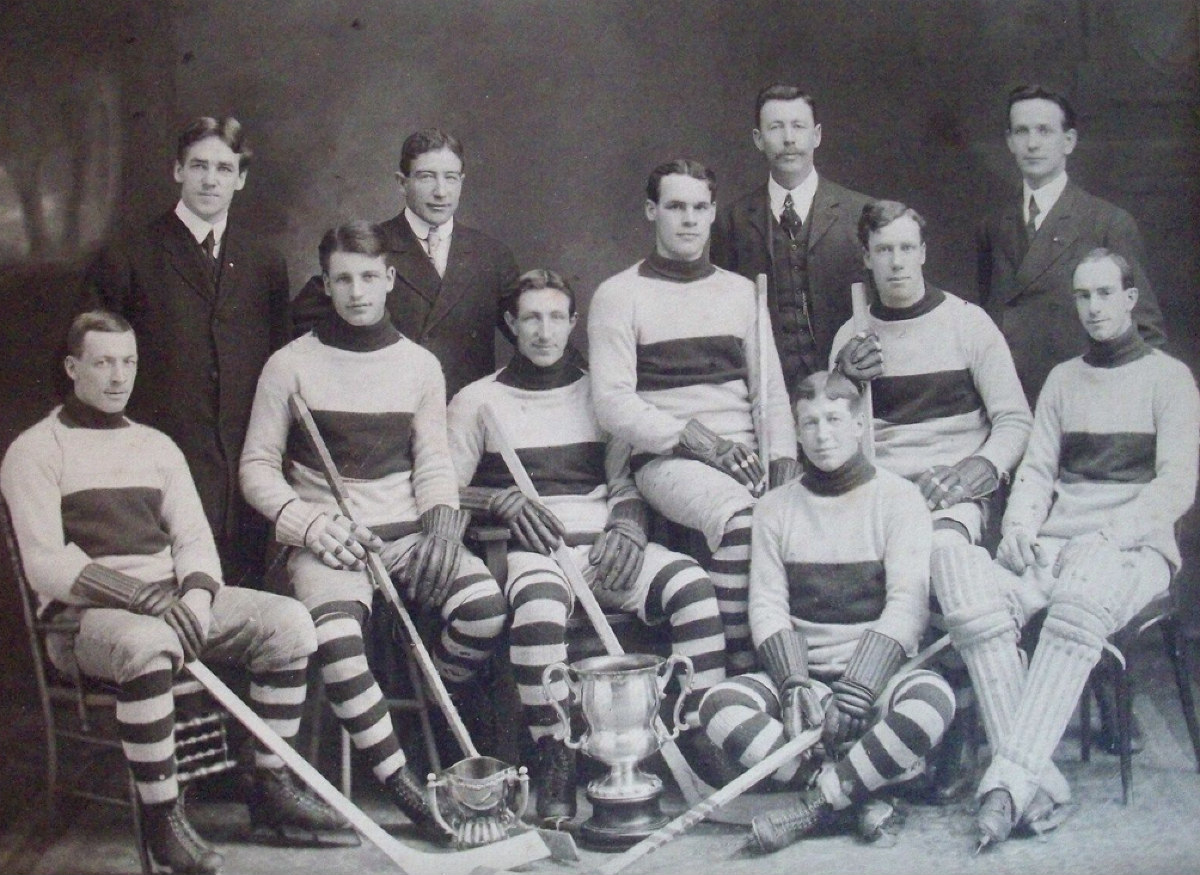
Ottawa New Edinburghs/Seconds in 1908. Alf Smith is in the back row, second from the left. Players left to right: Guy Boyce, Eddie Gerard, Morley Neate, Horace Merrill, Charlie Snelling, Jack Ryan and Lou Wright.

1890–91 – 1892–93 Ottawa HC
1895–96 Ottawa Aberdeens
1906–07 Ottawa Cliffsides
1907–08 Ottawa Seconds
1908–09 Ottawa Seconds
1909–10 Ottawa Seconds
1910–11 Ottawa Seconds
1917–18 Imperial Munitions
1918–19 St. Brigids
1919–20 Munitions
1920–21 Gunners
1921–22 Montagnards
1922–23 St. Patricks College
1923–24 Montagnards
1924–25 LaSalle College
1925–26 Gunners
1926–27 New Edinburgh
1927–28 Montagnards
1928–29 Shamrocks
1929–30 Shamrocks
1930–31 Rideaus
1931–32 Shamrocks
1932–33 Rideaus
1933–34 New Edinburgh
1934–35 Canadiens
1935–36 Brockville Magedomas
1936–37 Hull Volant
1937–38 Cornwall Flyers
1938–39 Hull Volant
1939–40 Hull Volant
1940–41 Hull Volant
1941–42 RCAF Flyers
1942–43 RCAF Flyers
1943–44 Hull Volant
1944–45 Hull Volant

== Junior champions ==
1927–28 Gunners
1928–29 Shamrocks
1929–30 Rideaus
1930–31 Primrose
1931–32 Primrose
1932–33 Shamrocks
1933–34 Shamrocks
1934–35 Rideaus
1935–36 Univ. of Ottawa
1936–37 Rideaus
1937–38 Primrose
1938–39 Hull Volant
1939–40 New Edinburgh
1940–41 Canadiens
1941–42 Univ. of Ottawa
1942–43 New Edinburgh
1943–44 St. Patricks College
1944–45 Montagnards
1945–46 St. Patricks College
1946–47 St. Patricks College
1947–48 Senators
1948–49 St. Patricks College
1949–50 St. Patricks College
1950–51 Eastview-St. Charles
1951–52 Eastview-St. Charles
1952–53 Eastview-St. Charles
1953–54 Eastview-St. Charles
1954–55 Shamrocks
1955–56 Shamrocks
1956–57 Shamrocks

== 1938–39 Senior League ==
RCAF Flyers 8–7–3–19 57–51
LaSalle Academy 9–8–1–19 52–62
Hull Volant 9–9–0–18 56–58
Ottawa Montagnards 6–6–4–16 51–45

First Place Playoff (sudden death): LaSalle 5 RCAF 4

Semi Final (Best of 5)
Hull 5 RCAF 2
RCAF 3 Hull 2
RCAF 5 Hull 3
Hull 6 RCAF 5
Hull 5 RCAF 3

Hull won 3–2

Final (Best of 5)
Hull 1 LaSalle 0
LaSalle 8 Hull 2
Hull 5 LaSalle 0
Hull 4 LaSalle 3

Hull won 3–1

== 1938–39 Junior League ==
Hull Volant 6–2–0–12 34–24
LaSalle Academy 6–2–0–12 30–24
Gladstones 5–3–0–10 30–20
Woodroffe 2–6–0–4 20–28
Buckingham Indians 1–7–0–2 20–38
LaSalle won the coin toss for first place.

Semi Finals (2 games total goals)
LaSalle 2 Woodroffe 2 Hull 3 Gladstones 0
LaSalle 3 Woodroffe 1 Gladstones 2 Hull 1

LaSalle won 5–3 Hull won 4–2

Final (2 games total goals)
Hull 3 LaSalle 2
Hull 6 LaSalle 2

Hull won 9–4

== Partial list of clubs ==
- Hull Volant
- Ottawa Army
- Ottawa Capitals
- Ottawa Commandos
- Ottawa Emmetts
- Ottawa Gladstones
- Ottawa Gunners—1928 Memorial Cup finalist
- Ottawa New Edinburghs
- Ottawa Primroses—1931 Memorial Cup finalist
- Ottawa RCAF Flyers
- Ottawa Rideaus
- Ottawa Senators (juniors)
- Ottawa Shamrocks
- Ottawa St Brigid's
- Ottawa Transport

== Bibliography ==
- Podnieks, Andrew; Hockey Hall of Fame (2004). Lord Stanley's Cup. Triumph Books. ISBN 1-55168-261-3.
