= Punch Broadbent =

Canadian ice hockey player (1892–1971)

Punch Broadbent MM
- Hockey Hall of Fame, 1962
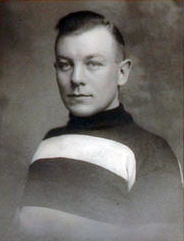
- Born: July 13, 1892 Ottawa, Ontario, Canada
- Died: March 5, 1971 (aged 78) Ottawa, Ontario, Canada
- Height: 5 ft 7 in (170 cm)
- Weight: 183 lb (83 kg; 13 st 1 lb)
- Position: Right wing
- Shot: Right
- Played for: Ottawa Senators; Montreal Maroons; New York Americans
- Playing career: 1912–1929

Harold Lawton "Harry" Broadbent MM (July 13, 1892 – March 5, 1971) was a Canadian ice hockey player. Broadbent played for the Ottawa Senators, Montreal Maroons and the New York Americans in the National Hockey Association (NHA) and National Hockey League (NHL) between 1912 and 1929. Broadbent won the Stanley Cup four times during his career, three times with Ottawa and once with Montreal. He is regarded as one of the first true power forwards in NHL history. For this reason, he was known in his day as "Punch" and "Old Elbows".

In the 1921–22 NHL season, Broadbent scored at least one goal in 16 consecutive games from December 16, 1921 to February 15, 1922, an NHL record that remains unbroken over a century later.

== Personal life ==
Born in Ottawa, Ontario. Broadbent married Leda Fitzsimmons and had one daughter, Sally Ann Broadbent. In the summer of 1915 Broadbent enlisted in the Canadian military to serve in the First World War. He served in the Royal Regiment of Canadian Artillery, and was promoted to Bombardier in October 1916. In March 1918 he was awarded the Military Medal for his service in the war. Broadbent's only brother Spencer was killed in action during the war.

A January 27, 1934 article on Broadbent in the Montreal Gazette by D. A. L. MacDonald says he was called "Punch" because of his round chubby face which would puff up like a Billiken charm doll when he smiled.

Broadbent died on March 5, 1971 at the age of 78. He was survived by his wife Leda, daughter Sally Ann and four grandchildren. He was interred at Beechwood Cemetery.

== Playing career ==
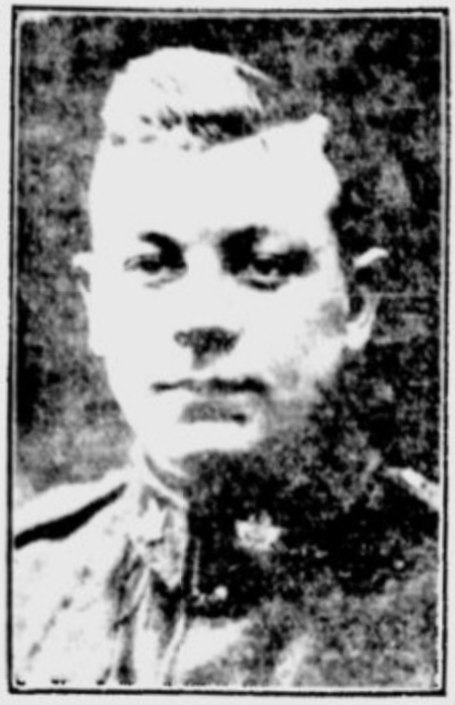
Broadbent with the military.

As a youth, Broadbent played ice hockey at Percy Street School, then starred for Ottawa Cliffsides and New Edinburgh in the Ottawa City League and Inter-provincial League. At age 20, he made his professional debut with the Ottawa Senators of the National Hockey Association (NHA) on December 28, 1912 against Quebec, scoring the first goal of his career. Broadbent played the 1912–13 season on a line with Jack Darragh. He was seventh in the league in scoring his rookie year, and while hobbled with injuries the next, was fourth in scoring the following year. He scored three goals in the Stanley Cup Final against the Vancouver Millionaires in 1915 before going to the war for three and one-half years.

Broadbent returned from the war in January 1919, and played the remaining eight games of the season for the Senators, now in the National Hockey League (NHL). With forwards Frank Nighbor and Cy Denneny, he starred for the Senators for six more seasons, playing for three Stanley Cup champions. Though he was a holdout for most of the 1921 season, Broadbent came back to win the league scoring title in 1922, with 32 goals in 24 games. He also set a record that season by scoring goals in sixteen consecutive games. The streak began during a 10–0 rout of the Montreal Canadiens on December 24 and lasted through to a 6–6 tie with Canadiens on February 15, and it included a stretch of six straight multi-goal games.

After the 1924 playoffs, teammate Clint Benedict and Broadbent were blamed for the playoff loss and sold by Ottawa to the expansion Montreal Maroons. Broadbent was the Maroons' leading scorer that first season, including a five-goal game against the Hamilton Tigers. In his second season with the Maroons, the team won its first Stanley Cup championship against the Ottawa Senators. He was traded back to the Senators in 1928 with cash for Hooley Smith. He played for the New York Americans in 1929 and retired after that season.

Broadbent finished his career with 172 goals and 58 assists in 360 professional games. After his playing career, he coached for several years in the Ottawa City Hockey League, winning the championship in 1933 with the Ottawa Rideaus. He was elected to the Hockey Hall of Fame in 1962.

== Career statistics ==
=== Regular season and playoffs ===
			Regular season					Playoffs
Season	Team	League	GP	G	A	Pts	PIM	GP	G	A	Pts	PIM
1908–09	Ottawa Emmetts	OCHL	6	14	0	14	6	2	1	0	1	0
1909–10	Ottawa Seconds	OCHL	2	3	0	3	5	—	—	—	—	—
1909–10	Hull Volants	LOVHL	1	0	0	0	0	—	—	—	—	—
1909–10	Ottawa Cliffsides	IPAHU	—	—	—	—	—	3	1	0	1	6
1910–11	Ottawa Cliffsides	OCHL	2	2	0	2	6	—	—	—	—	—
1910–11	Ottawa Cliffsides	IPAHU	6	14	0	14	18	1	0	0	0	3
1911–12	Ottawa New Edinburghs	IPAHU	10	20	0	20	39	4	7	0	7	0
1912–13	Ottawa Senators	NHA	20	20	0	20	15	—	—	—	—	—
1913–14	Ottawa Senators	NHA	17	6	7	13	61	—	—	—	—	—
1914–15	Ottawa Senators	NHA	20	24	3	27	115	5	3	0	3	—
1918–19	Ottawa Senators	NHL	8	4	3	7	12	5	2	2	4	28
1919–20	Ottawa Senators	NHL	21	19	6	25	40	—	—	—	—	—
1919–20	Ottawa Senators	St-Cup	—	—	—	—	—	4	0	0	0	3
1920–21	Ottawa Senators	NHL	9	4	1	5	10	2	0	2	2	4
1920–21	Ottawa Senators	St-Cup	—	—	—	—	—	4	2	0	2	4
1921–22	Ottawa Senators	NHL	24	32	14	46	28	2	0	1	1	8
1922–23	Ottawa Senators	NHL	24	14	1	15	34	2	0	0	0	2
1922–23	Ottawa Senators	St-Cup	—	—	—	—	—	6	6	1	7	10
1923–24	Ottawa Senators	NHL	22	9	4	13	44	2	0	0	0	2
1924–25	Montreal Maroons	NHL	30	14	6	20	75	—	—	—	—	—
1925–26	Montreal Maroons	NHL	36	12	5	17	112	4	2	1	3	14
1925–26	Montreal Maroons	St-Cup	—	—	—	—	—	4	1	0	1	22
1926–27	Montreal Maroons	NHL	42	9	5	14	88	2	0	0	0	0
1927–28	Ottawa Senators	NHL	43	3	2	5	62	2	0	0	0	0
1928–29	New York Americans	NHL	44	1	4	5	59	2	0	0	0	2
NHA totals			57	50	10	60	191	5	3	0	3	—
NHL totals			303	121	51	172	564	23	4	6	10	60
St-Cup totals			—	—	—	—	—	18	9	1	10	35

== Awards ==
- NHL scoring leader: 1922
- Stanley Cup champion: 1920, 1921, 1923, 1926
- Elected to the Hockey Hall of Fame in 1962

== Transactions ==
- January 21, 1919 – Signed as a free agent by Ottawa Senators.
- December 30, 1920 – Rights transferred to Hamilton Tigers from Ottawa Senators by NHL with Sprague Cleghorn. Both Broadbent and Cleghorn refused to report.
- January 4, 1921 – Rights traded to Montreal Canadiens by Hamilton Tigers for cash. Broadbent refused to report.
- February 21, 1921 – Rights returned to Ottawa Senators by NHL.
- October 20, 1924 – Traded to Montreal Maroons by Ottawa Senators with Clint Benedict for cash.
- October 7, 1927 – Traded to Ottawa Senators by Montreal Maroons with $22,500 for Hooley Smith.
- October 15, 1928 – Traded to New York Americans by Ottawa Senators for $10,000.
- January 1, 1929 – Fined $25 by NHL for trying to start a fight in the penalty box during game with Montreal Canadiens.
- October 31, 1929 – Announced retirement.

== Records (1) ==
- Longest goal streak, season: 16 in 1921–22 (December 16, 1921 to February 15, 1922)

== See also ==
- List of members of the Hockey Hall of Fame
- List of players with 5 or more goals in an NHL game

Preceded by Position created	Montreal Maroons captain 1924–25	Succeeded by Dunc Munro
Preceded by Newsy Lalonde	NHL Scoring Champion; 1922	Succeeded by Babe Dye
