= Jack Darragh =

Canadian ice hockey player (1890–1924)

- Hockey Hall of Fame, 1962
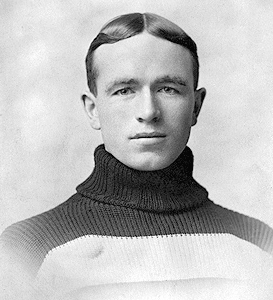
- Born: December 4, 1890 Ottawa, Ontario, Canada
- Died: June 28, 1924 (aged 33) Ottawa, Ontario, Canada
- Height: 5 ft 10 in (178 cm)
- Weight: 168 lb (76 kg; 12 st 0 lb)
- Position: Right wing
- Shot: Left
- Played for: Ottawa Senators
- Playing career: 1910–1924

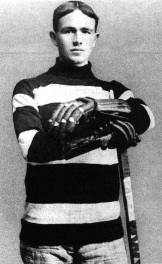
Darragh with the Ottawa Senators.

John Proctor Darragh (December 4, 1890 – June 28, 1924) was a Canadian professional ice hockey player. Darragh played the forward position for the Ottawa Senators in the National Hockey League (NHL) and its predecessor the National Hockey Association (NHA). Darragh was a member of four Stanley Cup championship teams (1911, 1920, 1921, 1923) and a NHA championship team (1915). He was an older brother of NHL player Harold Darragh.

In 1920, Darragh became the first player in the NHL era to score three game-winning goals in a Stanley Cup Final series - a mark that has since been tied, but never surpassed. He was inducted into the Hockey Hall of Fame in 1962.

== Playing career ==
Jack Darragh made a meteoric jump directly from the amateur ranks to professional hockey, without any schooling in the junior game, going from playing with all of Ottawa Stewartons (OCSHL), Fort Coulonge (Pontiac Hockey League) and Ottawa Cliffsides (IPAHU) in three different amateur leagues in 1909–10, to earn a place with the Ottawa Senators of the NHA at the beginning of the 1910–11 campaign when Horace Gaul got injured against the Montreal Canadiens.

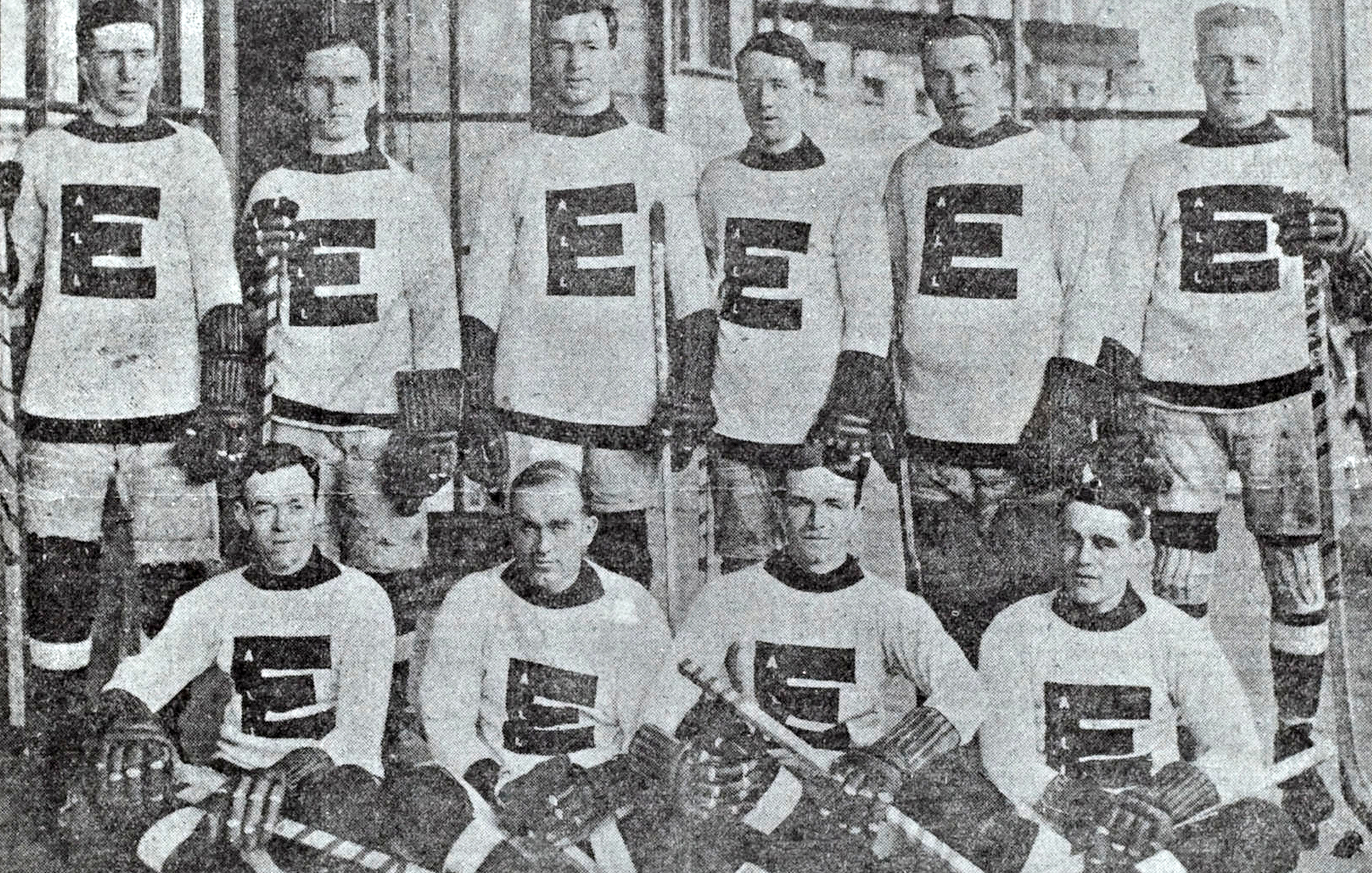
Darragh, sitting second from the right, with the 1912 NHA All-Stars.

Darragh was signed to his first professional contract by then Ottawa Senators manager Pete Green, at the restaurant Uwanta Lunch at Sparks Street in Ottawa, to the modest amount of $15 per week. In his professional debut, he scored a goal against Georges Vézina and the Montreal Canadiens. He soon established himself as an important piece of the team and during the 1914–15 season he was chosen team captain, a role that Horace Merrill took over the following year in 1915–16.

Darragh played his entire professional career with the Ottawa Senators. He was a big part of their success, winning four Stanley Cups; in 1911, 1920, 1921 and 1923. Darragh's skillset included a particular penchant for clutch scoring; he potted all three game-winning goals against the Seattle Metropolitans in 1920, and in the 1921 Stanley Cup Final against Vancouver Millionaires, he scored both goals in a 2–1 deciding game victory.

He and teammate Hamby Shore had the NHL's first contract dispute; on the opening night of the NHL. They finally came to terms at the eleventh hour and two—they even missed part of the first game, which the Senators ended up losing 7-4 to the Montreal Canadiens. Darragh is one of two players (with Mike Bossy) to have scored the Stanley Cup-winning goal in back-to-back seasons. He retired after the 1921 Stanley Cup win, but returned after one season to play for the Stanley Cup-winning team of 1922–23, the third in four seasons, all with Darragh in the lineup.

During his last NHL season in 1923–24 Darragh suffered a broken right knee cap after having collided with Edmond Bouchard of the Hamilton Tigers in a game at the Ottawa Auditorium, which held him off the ice for parts of the season.

Darragh retired for a second time after the 1923–24 season and died a few months later due to peritonitis, which was the result of a ruptured appendix. He was survived by his wife Elizabeth and his three daughters Aileen, Frances and Marion. Darragh was the third player from the 1911 Stanley Cup winning Ottawa Senators team that had died within less than 10 years, following Marty Walsh (tuberculosis 1915) and Hamby Shore (influenza 1918), and he was followed by Bruce Ridpath who died in 1925 after having suffered a stroke.

== Playing style ==
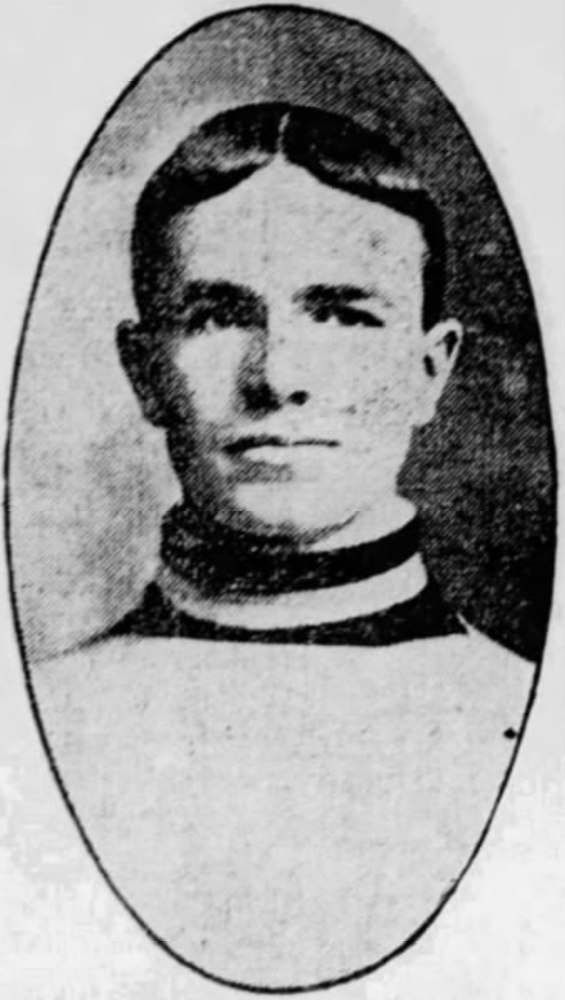
Darragh while with the Ottawa Cliffsides

Although without any background in organized junior hockey, Jack Darragh was considered a good skater and had speed to burn to go along with much grit and determination, playing a fast and strong game on the forward line. He was renowned for his backhand, which he would shoot between the opposing goaltender and the post, and his clever stick-handling ability. While considered a clean and gentlemanly player, Darragh still carried a fair amount of pluck to his game, and during the 1913–14 NHA season he led the Ottawa Senators with 69 penalty minutes. A right winger position wise, Darragh had good chemistry on the Ottawa Senators forward line with centre forward Frank Nighbor, and the two players developed a system of team play between each other over the years that carried the Senators to many victories. At the onset of his hockey career, up until 1911, Darragh played as a rover, the more free-roaming position between defence and the forward line, but when the NHA abandoned the seven-man game prior to the 1911–12 season and the rover was taken out of the game, he switched to right wing instead. He also occasionally played on the left wing.

The June 30, 1924 obituary in the Ottawa Citizen mentioned, as pointed out by officers of the Ottawa Senators, that Darragh was a "model athlete" who never smoked or tasted liquor in any form, and that he "trained assiduously both in and out of the hockey seasons and always kept himself in perfect condition." According to the newspaper Darragh was a "beautiful specimen of an athlete and his weight, coupled with terrific speed and magnificent stickhandling, made him a terror to opposing teams."

"It was something awful those fellows cut loose. I thought we had them until Rowe was hurt, but the Ottawas had saved themselves and skated us off our feet in the third period. Nighbor had our line demoralized with his speed and poke check and no one could stop Darragh and Gerard. Darragh scored three goals in as many minutes, and Harry Holmes afterwards told me he could see three our four Darraghs on the ice, the way the big Ottawa forward was galloping up and down. That guy isn't human when he gets his blood up. We were all sorry to lose, but we were beaten by a wonderful team. They're a credit to the game."

— Seattle Metropolitans forward Frank Foyston on Jack Darragh and the Ottawa Senators after the 1920 Stanley Cup Final.

With his good physique and strong conditioning Darragh could play at a high level throughout the entirety of the games, which made him a strong third period threat with a penchant for clutch scoring. One such instance happened in the 1920 Stanley Cup Final against the Seattle Metropolitans where the fifth and deciding game between the two teams stood at 1-1 after two periods. But in the third period Darragh and his teammates on the Ottawa forward line skated the Metropolitans off their feet and scored five goals for a 6-1 victory, with Darragh himself recording a hat-trick.

In his younger days Darragh had been a lacrosse player of great promise, playing with the Ottawa Stars lacrosse team, before throwing himself in with the game of hockey. He was also into distance running, and he also held down a place on the baseball team of his employer at the Ottawa Dairy Company. At his residence on Java Avenue in Ottawa, just prior to his death, he had also built an adjoining clay tennis court to train on.

== Career statistics ==
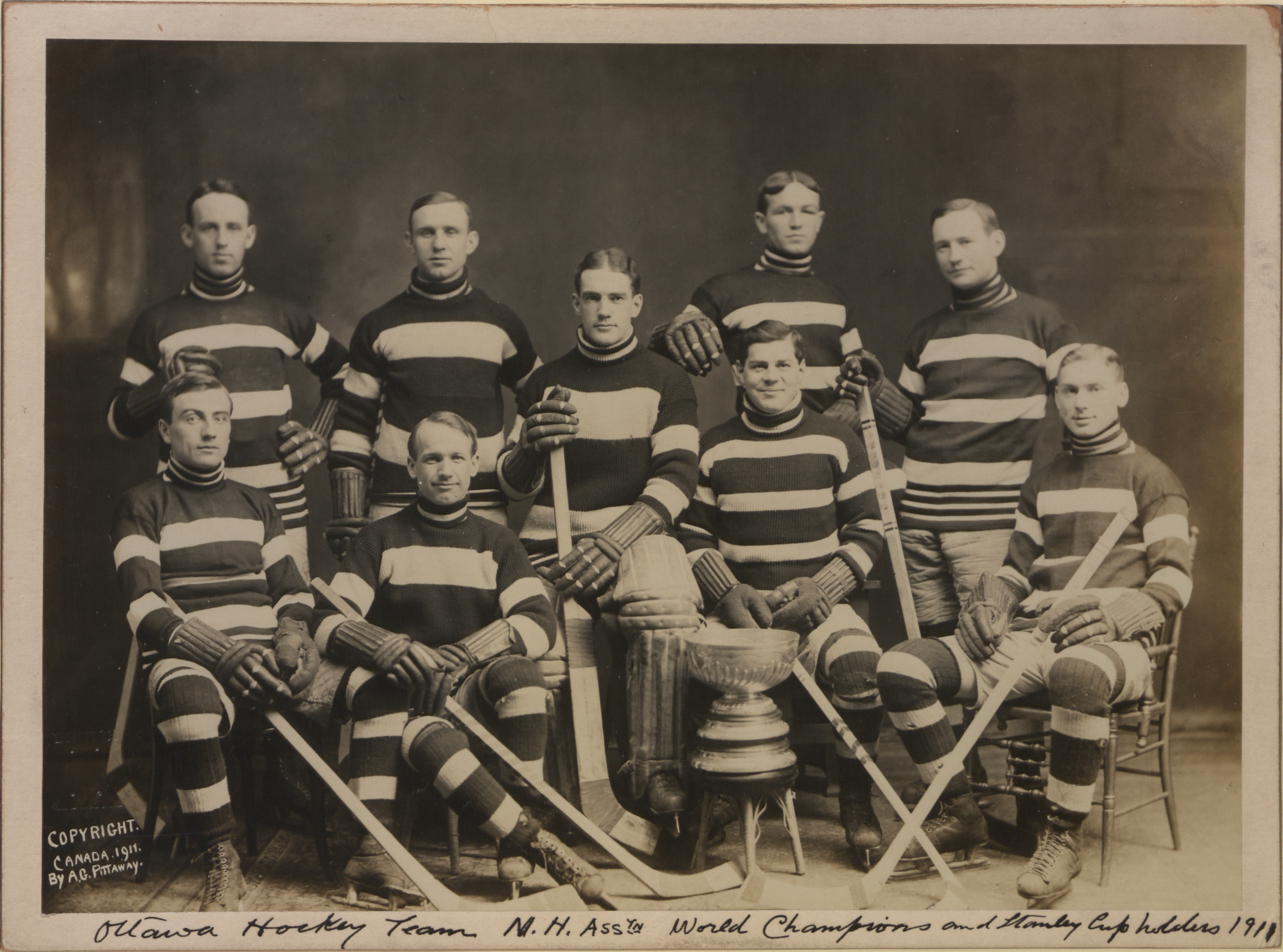
1911 Ottawa Senators with the Stanley Cup. Back row, from left: Alex Currie, Hamby Shore, Jack Darragh, Bruce Stuart. Front row, from left: Marty Walsh, Bruce Ridpath, Percy LeSueur, Fred Lake, Albert Kerr.

			Regular season					Playoffs
Season	Team	League	GP	G	A	Pts	PIM	GP	G	A	Pts	PIM
1909–10	Fort Coulonge	PontHL
1909–10	Ottawa Stewartons	OCHL	5	11	0	11	11	1	0	0	0	3
1909–10	Ottawa Cliffsides	IPAHU	—	—	—	—	—	3	4	0	4	0
1909–10	Ottawa Cliffsides	Allan Cup	—	—	—	—	—	1	0	0	0	0
1910–11	Ottawa Stewartons	OCHL	3	7	0	7	0	—	—	—	—	—
1910–11	Ottawa Senators	NHA	16	18	0	18	36	—	—	—	—	—
1910–11	Ottawa Senators	St-Cup	—	—	—	—	—	2	0	0	0	6
1911–12	Ottawa Senators	NHA	17	15	0	15	10	—	—	—	—	—
1911–12	NHA All-Stars	Exh.	3	4	0	4	8	—	—	—	—	—
1912–13	Ottawa Senators	NHA	20	15	0	15	16	—	—	—	—	—
1913–14	Ottawa Senators	NHA	20	23	5	28	69	—	—	—	—	—
1914–15	Ottawa Senators	NHA	18	11	2	13	32	5	4	0	4	9
1915–16	Ottawa Senators	NHA	21	16	5	21	41	—	—	—	—	—
1916–17	Ottawa Senators	NHA	20	24	4	28	17	2	2	0	2	3
1917–18	Ottawa Senators	NHL	18	14	5	19	26	—	—	—	—	—
1918–19	Ottawa Senators	NHL	14	11	3	14	33	5	2	0	2	3
1919–20	Ottawa Senators	NHL	23	22	14	36	22	—	—	—	—	—
1919–20	Ottawa Senators	St-Cup	—	—	—	—	—	5	5	2	7	3
1920–21	Ottawa Senators	NHL	24	11	15	26	20	2	0	0	0	2
1920–21	Ottawa Senators	St-Cup	—	—	—	—	—	5	5	0	5	12
1921–22	Did not play	—	—	—	—	—	—	—	—	—	—	—
1922–23	Ottawa Senators	NHL	24	6	9	15	10	2	1	0	1	2
1923–24	Ottawa Senators	NHL	18	2	0	2	2	2	0	0	0	2
NHA totals			132	122	16	138	221	7	6	0	6	12
NHL totals			121	66	46	112	113	11	3	0	3	9
St-Cup totals			—	—	—	—	—	12	10	2	12	21

== Awards and achievements ==
- Stanley Cup champion: 1911, 1920, 1921, 1923
- 1962 – Inducted into the Hockey Hall of Fame.

== NHL Records (2) ==
- Most goals, Stanley Cup Final period: 3 (tied with seven other players) on April 1, 1920
- Most game-winning goals, Stanley Cup Final series: 3 (tied with five other players) in the 1920 Stanley Cup Final first player to ever score a 3rd period goal

== See also ==
- List of ice hockey players who died during their playing career

Preceded by Percy LeSueur	Ottawa Senators captain (Original Era); 1914–15	Succeeded by Horace Merrill
