= Archie Atkinson (ice hockey) =

Canadian ice hockey player (1886–1968)

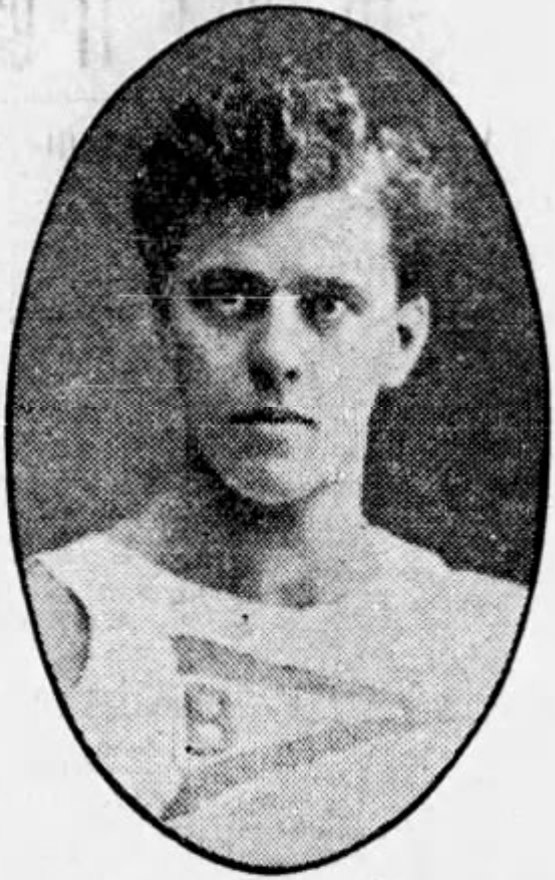
- Atkinson as a member of the Britannia Yacht Club
- Born: February 17, 1886 Ottawa, Ontario, Canada
- Died: August 4, 1968 (aged 82) Ottawa, Ontario, Canada
- Height: 5 ft 8 in (173 cm)
- Weight: 175 lb (79 kg; 12 st 7 lb)
- Position: Defence
- Shot: Right
- Played for: Montreal Wanderers
- Playing career: 1911–1923

Archibald Maynard Atkinson (February 17, 1886 – August 4, 1968) was a Canadian professional ice hockey player. He played with the Montreal Wanderers of the National Hockey Association in the 1912–13 season and 1913–14 season, appearing in a total of seven games.

Atkinson was also a canoeist with the Britannia Yacht Club in Ottawa, though he lost his amateur status when he signed up as a professional hockey player.
