= Interprovincial Amateur Hockey Union =

- Sport: Ice hockey
- Founded: 1908
- First season: 1909
- Folded: 1914
- Country: Canada
- Most titles: Ottawa Cliffsides (2), Ottawa New Edinburghs (2), Grand-Mère HC (2)

The Interprovincial Amateur Hockey Union (IAHU or IPAHU) was the premier amateur ice hockey league in Canada after the split between the amateur and professional ice hockey teams of the Eastern Canada Amateur Hockey Association (ECAHA) in 1908.

== History ==
In November 1908, the Montreal Victorias resigned from the ECAHA and proposed to set up a new amateur ice hockey league. The founding meeting of the new Interprovincial league was held on November 14, 1908. That same day, the Montreal Hockey Club resigned from the ECAHA after not being allowed to hold on to Didier Pitre, whom the club had signed from Montreal Shamrocks. Montreal HC then met with the Victorias to apply. The league's first president was Blair Russel of the Victorias. The first vice-president was Percy Quinn of Toronto AAC, second vice-president was A. Sutherland of Ottawa Cliffsides and the treasurer was A. A. Eaves of the Montreal Hockey Club. The same day the team representatives wrote the league's constitution.

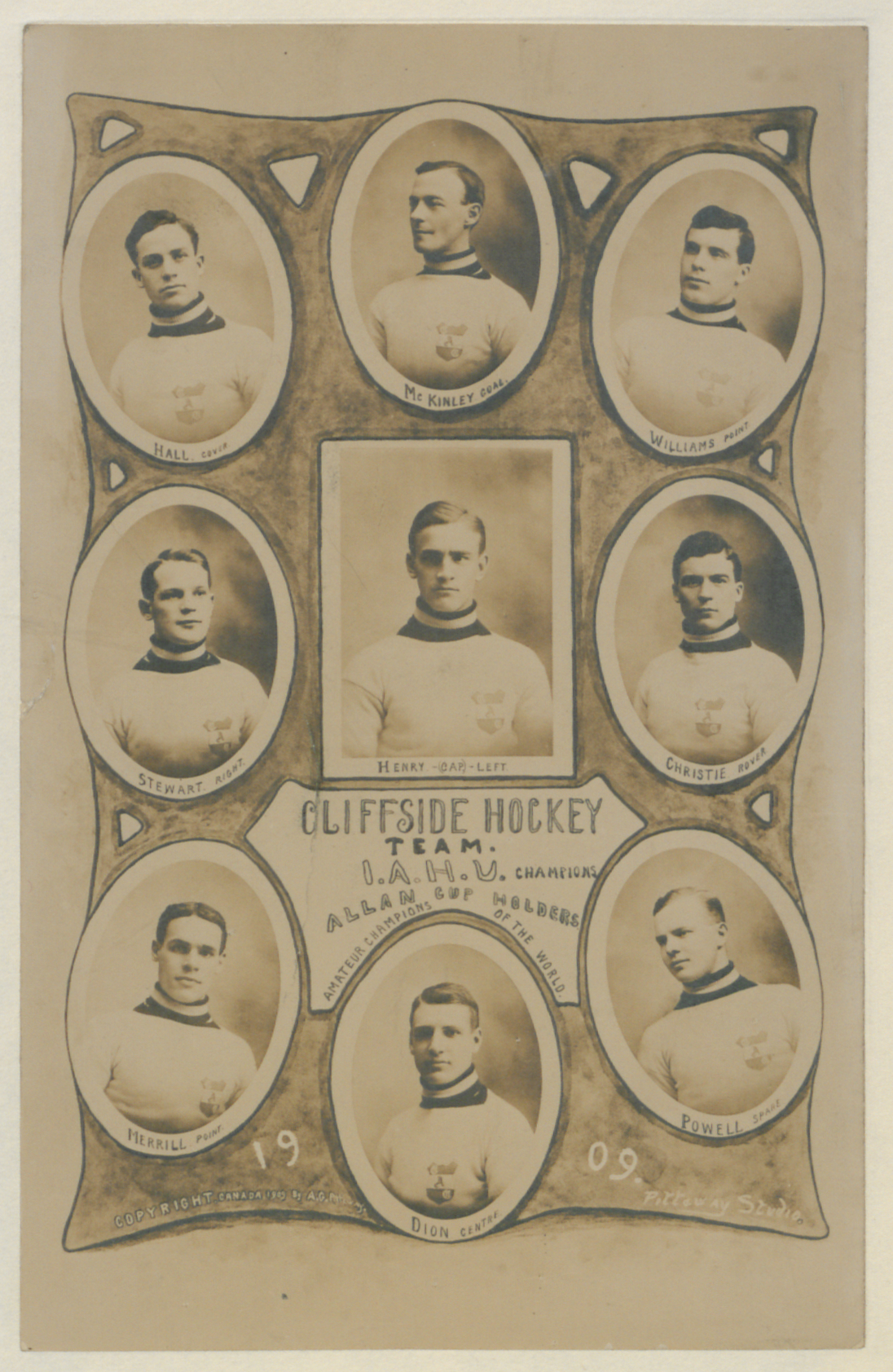
Ottawa Cliffsides in 1909.

The teams began play in January 1909 with a four-team league of the Victorias, Montreal Hockey Club, Ottawa Cliffsides and Toronto AAC. Toronto AAC would continue play in the Ontario Hockey Association senior series as well.

In February 1909, it was announced that a new championship trophy for Canadian amateur teams was donated by Sir Montagu Allan. The new Allan Cup was given to the Victorias of the IAHU as the premier amateur team. Ottawa Cliffsides were IAHU champions and became Allan Cup champions as well. The Cliffsides would lose the Allan Cup in a challenge to Queen's College of Kingston, Ontario.

For 1910–11, the league doubled to eight teams, with two Ottawa teams and two Montreal teams in the Central division, and a new Eastern division with teams in Grand-Mère, Trois-Rivières, Westmount and Sherbrooke. The league expanded again for 1911–12 to thirteen teams, with four in the Central, five in the Eastern and four in a new Montreal division. In 1912–13, the league expanded to nineteen teams in five divisions. It was the peak of membership in the Interprovincial, as in 1913–14 the Montreal teams left to join the Montreal City League, leaving it to fifteen teams in four divisions. 1913–14 was the final season of the Interprovincial.

== Notable players ==
Following IAHU players were inducted into the Hockey Hall of Fame post-career

- Russell Bowie (Montreal Victorias, 1908–1910)
- Blair Russel (Montreal Victorias, 1908–1910)
- Jack Darragh (Ottawa Cliffsides, 1909–10)
- Harry "Punch" Broadbent (Ottawa Cliffsides, 1909–1911, Ottawa New Edinburghs, 1911–12)
- Eddie Gerard (Ottawa New Edinburghs, 1910–1914)
- Clint Benedict (Ottawa New Edinburghs, 1910–1912)
- Cooper Smeaton (Montreal Westmount, 1910–1913) (inducted as an on-ice official)
- George Boucher (Ottawa New Edinburghs, 1913–14)

== Teams ==
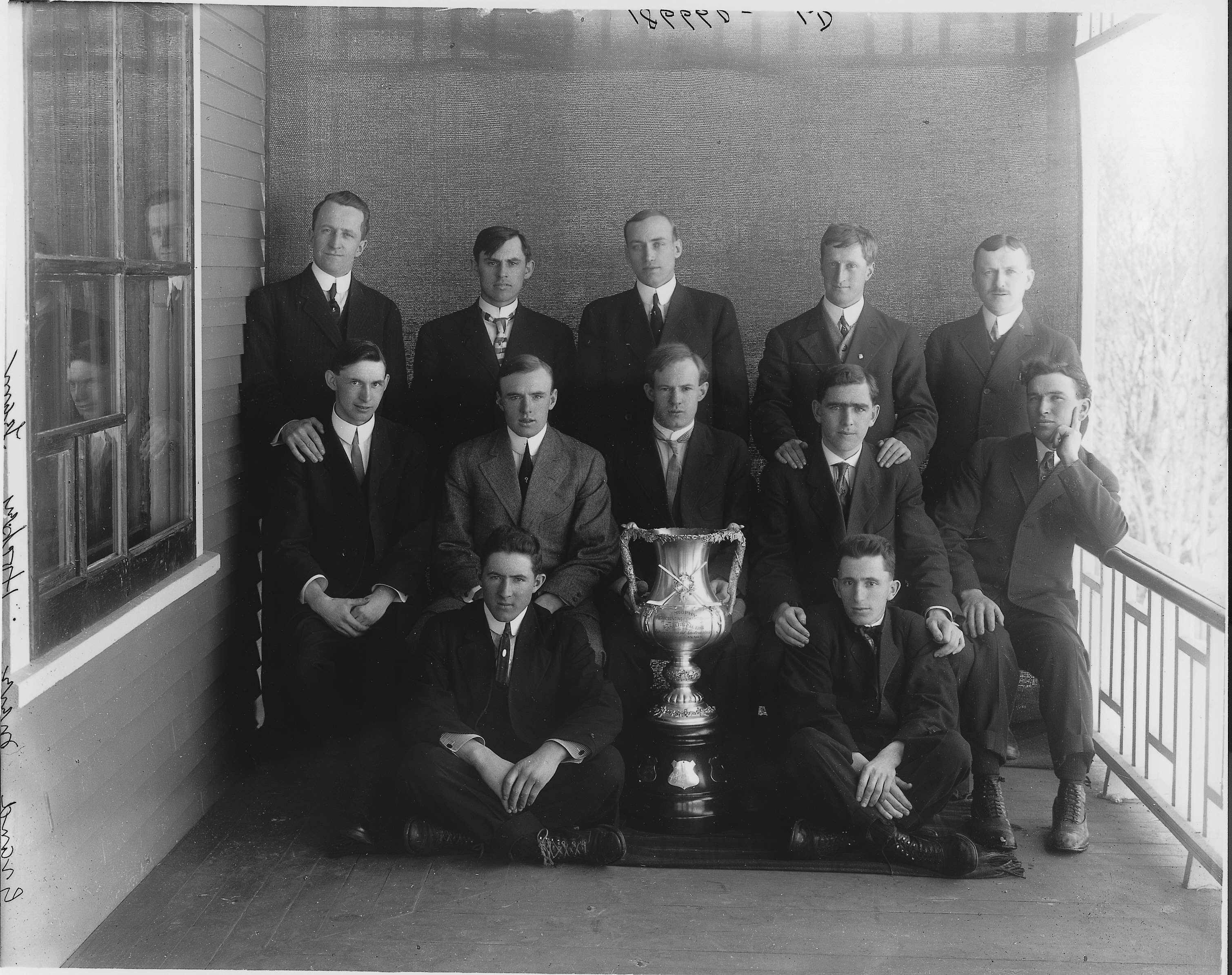
Grand-Mère Hockey Club in 1910–11 with the championship trophy of the Eastern Section of the IPAHU. Dave Ritchie, famous for scoring the first ever NHL goal in 1917, is seated second from left in the middle row.

- Almonte, (1912–13)
- Brockville, (1911–1913)
- Carleton Place, (1912–13)
- Grand-Mère H/C, (1910–1914)
- Hull Nationals (1911–12)
- Montreal Nationals, (1911–12)
- Montreal Victorias, (1908–1913)
- Montreal Hockey Club, (1908–1913)
- Montreal St. Patricks, (1911–12)
- Montreal Shamrocks, (1911–12)
- Ottawa College, (1912–13)
- Ottawa Cliffsides, (1908–1911)
- Ottawa New Edinburghs, (1910–1913)
- Ottawa Stewartons, (1911–1913)
- Perth Crescents, (1912–13)
- Pembroke, (1912–13)
- Quebec Laurentide, (1913–14)
- Quebec St. Patricks, (1912–1914)
- Renfrew, (1911–1913)
- Shawinigan Falls, (1912–14)
- Sherbrooke, (1910–1914)
- Smiths Falls, (1912–13)
- Toronto Amateur Athletic Club, (1908–1910)
- Trois Rivieres, (1910–1912)
- Montreal Westmount, (1910–1912)

== Seasons ==
Season	Teams	Champion
1908–09	Montreal HC, Montreal Victorias, Ottawa Cliffsides, Toronto AAC	†Ottawa Cliffsides (best record)
1909–10	Montreal HC, Montreal Victorias, Ottawa Cliffsides, Toronto AAC	Ottawa Cliffsides and Montreal Victorias tied for first place. Cliffsides won two-game total-goals playoff.
1910–11	Central: Montreal Victorias, Montreal HC, Ottawa Cliffsides, Ottawa New Edinburghs; Eastern: Grand-Mère HC, Trois-Rivières, Montreal Westmount, Sherbrooke	Ottawa New Edinburghs
1911–12	Ottawa: Ottawa New Edinburghs, Ottawa Stewartons, Hull Nationals, Renfrew; Central: Montreal HC, Montreal Victorias, Montreal Shamrocks, Brockville; Eastern: Grand-Mère HC, Montreal Westmount, Montreal St. Patricks, Sherbrooke, Trois-Rivières	Ottawa New Edinburghs
1912–13	Ottawa: Ottawa New Edinburghs, Ottawa College, Ottawa Stewartons; Montreal: Montreal HC, Montreal Victorias, Montreal St. Patricks, Shawinigan Falls; Western: Smiths Falls, Brockville, Perth; Northern: Renfrew, Almonte, Pembroke, Carlton Place; Eastern: Grand-Mère HC, Trois-Rivières, Sherbrooke, Montreal Westmount, Quebec St. Patricks	Grand-Mère HC
1913–14	Ottawa: Ottawa New Edinburghs, Ottawa Britannia, Ottawa Aberdeens; Western: Smiths Falls, Brockville, Perth; Northern: Renfrew, Almonte, Pembroke, Carlton Place; Eastern: Grand-Mère HC, Shawinigan Falls, Sherbrooke, Quebec Laurentide, Quebec St. Patricks	Grand-Mère HC (lost Allan Cup challenge 5-10 (4-6, 1-4) to the Regina Victorias)

† Allan Cup champion
