= Art Gauthier =

Canadian ice hockey player

- Born: October 10, 1904; Espanola, Ontario, Canada
- Died: June 30, 1977 (aged 72)
- Height: 5 ft 8 in (173 cm)
- Weight: 158 lb (72 kg; 11 st 4 lb)
- Position: Centre
- Shot: Left
- Played for: Montreal Canadiens
- Playing career: 1923–1936

Patrice Arthur "Nosey" Gauthier (October 10, 1904 – June 30, 1977) was a Canadian professional ice hockey centre. He played 13 games in the National Hockey League for the Montreal Canadiens during the 1926–27 season. The rest of his career, which lasted from 1923 to 1936, was spent in the minor leagues. He is buried in Montreal's Mount Royal Cemetery.

Gauthier played for the Galt Terriers senior amateur team of the Ontario Hockey Association from 1924 until 1927. He returned to Montreal to make his professional debut with the Canadiens in the 1926–27 season, playing 13 games in the regular season, and one in the playoffs. It was his only time in the NHL. He would play over 200 games in the minor leagues, with the Providence Reds, London Panthers, Toronto Millionaires, Hamilton Tigers, Niagara Falls Cataracts, London Tecumsehs, and finally with the Buffalo Bisons of the IHL in 1931–32.

== Career statistics ==
=== Regular season and playoffs ===
			Regular season					Playoffs
Season	Team	League	GP	G	A	Pts	PIM	GP	G	A	Pts	PIM
1921–22	Iroquois Falls Eskimos	NOJHA	—	—	—	—	—	7	5	5	10	—
1922–23	Iroquois Falls Eskimos	NOJHA	—	—	—	—	—	—	—	—	—	—
1923–24	North Bay Trappers	NOHA	6	2	0	2	—	5	9	0	9	—
1924–25	Galt Terriers	OHA Sr	20	7	10	17	34	—	—	—	—	—
1925–26	Galt Terriers	OHA Sr	20	13	7	20	31	2	2	2	4	0
1926–27	Montreal Canadiens	NHL	13	0	0	0	0	1	0	0	0	0
1926–27	Galt Terriers	OHA Sr	11	6	7	13	23	—	—	—	—	—
1927–28	London Panthers	Can-Pro	23	8	3	11	22	—	—	—	—	—
1927–28	Providence Reds	Can-Am	16	2	0	2	6	—	—	—	—	—
1928–29	Toronto Ravinas	Can-Pro	38	10	5	15	24	2	0	1	1	2
1928–29	Montreal CPR	MRTAHL	12	3	3	6	10	2	1	0	1	0
1929–30	Hamilton Tigers	IHL	21	2	1	3	6	—	—	—	—	—
1929–30	Niagara Falls Cataracts	IHL	19	4	2	6	36	—	—	—	—	—
1930–31	Galt Terriers	OPHL	10	0	0	0	0	—	—	—	—	—
1930–31	London Tecumsehs	IHL	1	0	0	0	0	—	—	—	—	—
1930–31	Buffalo Bisons	IHL	22	3	0	3	8	6	0	0	0	0
1935–36	Springfield Indians	Can-Am	6	0	1	1	4	—	—	—	—	—
IHL totals			86	11	4	15	50	6	0	0	0	0
NHL totals			13	0	0	0	0	1	0	0	0	0
