= Joe Ironstone =

Canadian ice hockey player

- Born: June 28, 1898 Sudbury, Ontario, Canada
- Died: December 15, 1972 (aged 74) Sudbury, Ontario, Canada
- Height: 5 ft 6 in (168 cm)
- Weight: 180 lb (82 kg; 12 st 12 lb)
- Position: Goaltender
- Caught: Right
- Played for: New York Americans; Toronto Maple Leafs
- Playing career: 1921–1936

Joseph Kelly Ironstone (June 28, 1898 – December 15, 1972) was a Canadian professional ice hockey player. Ironstone was a goaltender who played professionally from 1921 until 1936. He played two games in the National Hockey League (NHL) with the New York Americans and Toronto Maple Leafs, but played mostly in the minor professional leagues. Ironstone was the second Jew to play in the NHL.

== Playing career ==
Born in Sudbury, Ontario, Ironstone was Jewish. He first played senior hockey in 1921 with the Sudbury Wolves of the Northern Ontario Hockey Association. He played three seasons with the Wolves before joining the Ottawa Senators for the 1924–25 season. Ironstone was the back-up goaltender for the season, and did not see game action. In 1925–26, Ironstone played for the new New York Americans expansion team of the NHL, but was mostly the backup. He played in one game and allowed 3 goals in 40 minutes, but did not get the decision, becoming the second Jewish player to play in the NHL, after Sam Rothschild; it was his only game of the season. He joined the Niagara Falls Cataracts Canadian Professional Hockey League (Can-Pro) minor league team for the 1926–27 season.

The following season, Ironstone was traded to the Toronto Ravinas, where he was called up to play for the Toronto Maple Leafs of the NHL. He played one game, a 0–0 tie that went to 10 minutes of overtime. Ironstone asked for double the contract rate for the game, an offer which was accepted by the Leafs' owner Conn Smythe. However, Smythe informed Ironstone that would be the last game he would ever play in the NHL, which ultimately was the case.

He returned to the Can-Pro league in 1928–29, and played for numerous teams until 1931, when he retired from hockey temporarily. He returned to hockey when he moved back to Sudbury in 1933, playing for the Sudbury Legionnaires, Falconbridge Falcons, and finally, the Sudbury Wolves, returning to the team he started professionally with.

== Personal life ==
After leaving ice hockey, Ironstone returned to the family business, a men's wear store started by his father Hyman. He was an avid curler and an original member of the Sudbury Granite Club. He died on December 12, 1972, in Sudbury at the age of 74.

== In media ==
Ironstone was the subject of a radio play written by Paul Davies in 1996.

== Career statistics ==
=== Regular season and playoffs ===
			Regular season								Playoffs
Season	Team	League	GP	W	L	T	Min	GA	SO	GAA	GP	W	L	T	Min	GA	SO	GAA
1921–22	Sudbury Wolves	NOHA	6	3	2	0	350	12	0	2.06	—	—	—	—	—	—	—	—
1921–22	Sudbury Legionnaires	NOHA	3	3	0	0	180	4	0	1.33	2	0	1	1	120	5	0	2.50
1922–23	Sudbury Wolves	NOHA	8	4	4	0	478	23	2	2.89	—	—	—	—	—	—	—	—
1923–24	Sudbury Wolves	NOHA	—	—	—	—	—	—	—	—	—	—	—	—	—	—	—	—
1925–26	New York Americans	NHL	1	0	0	0	40	3	0	4.50	—	—	—	—	—	—	—	—
1926–27	Niagara Falls Cataracts	Can Pro	23	6	15	1	1429	64	1	2.69	—	—	—	—	—	—	—	—
1927–28	Toronto Maple Leafs	NHL	1	0	0	1	70	0	1	0.00	—	—	—	—	—	—	—	—
1927–28	Toronto Ravinas	Can Pro	26	13	10	3	1610	46	7	1.77	2	0	2	0	120	11	0	5.50
1927–28	Niagara Falls Catracts	Can Pro	14	3	6	5	890	33	1	2.22	—	—	—	—	—	—	—	—
1928–29	London Panthers	Can Pro	42	16	22	4	2580	109	3	2.53	—	—	—	—	—	—	—	—
1929–30	London Panthers	IHL	10	—	—	—	350	35	0	3.76	—	—	—	—	—	—	—	—
1929–30	Kitchener Flying Dutchmen	Can Pro	15	7	8	0	910	39	2	2.57	—	—	—	—	—	—	—	—
1930–31	Guelph Maple Leafs	OPHL	19	8	10	1	1180	53	1	2.69	—	—	—	—	—	—	—	—
1930–31	Syracuse Stars	IHL	13	1	10	2	830	51	1	3.69	—	—	—	—	—	—	—	—
1933–34	Sudbury Legionnaires	NOHA	—	—	—	—	—	—	—	—	—	—	—	—	—	—	—	—
1934–35	Sudbury Legionnaires	NOHA	10	—	—	—	600	42	0	4.20	—	—	—	—	—	—	—	—
1935–36	Falconbridge Falcons	NOHA	6	—	—	—	360	12	1	2.00	3	—	—	—	180	9	0	3.00
1935–36	Sudbury Wolves	NOHA	1	0	1	0	60	6	0	6.00	—	—	—	—	—	—	—	—
NHL totals			2	0	0	1	110	3	1	1.64	—	—	—	—	—	—	—	—

== See also ==
- List of select Jewish ice hockey players
