= Lloyd Gross =

Canadian ice hockey player

- Born: September 5, 1905; Berlin, Ontario, Canada
- Died: December 11, 1990 (aged 85)
- Height: 5 ft 8 in (173 cm)
- Weight: 185 lb (84 kg; 13 st 3 lb)
- Position: Left wing
- Shot: Left
- Played for: Detroit Red Wings; Boston Bruins; New York Americans; Toronto Maple Leafs
- Playing career: 1925–1942

Lloyd George "Bomber" Gross (September 5, 1905 – December 11, 1990) was a professional ice hockey player who played 52 games in the National Hockey League. He played for the Toronto Maple Leafs, Boston Bruins, Detroit Red Wings, and New York Americans between 1927 and 1935. The rest of his career, which lasted from 1925 to 1942, was spent in various minor leagues. He was born in Berlin, Ontario.

== Career statistics ==
=== Regular season and playoffs ===
			Regular season					Playoffs
Season	Team	League	GP	G	A	Pts	PIM	GP	G	A	Pts	PIM
1924–25	Kitchener Greenshirts	OHA	8	14	4	18	—	—	—	—	—	—
1925–26	Kitchener Greenshirts	OHA	11	7	11	18	—	—	—	—	—	—
1926–27	Kitchener Greenshirts	OHA Sr	11	7	4	11	4	4	0	2	2	2
1926–27	Toronto Maple Leafs	NHL	6	1	1	2	0	—	—	—	—	—
1927–28	Toronto Ravinas	Can-Pro	41	12	3	15	42	2	0	0	0	10
1928–29	Kitchener Flying Dutchmen	Can-Pro	40	9	4	13	59	3	0	0	0	4
1929–30	Toronto Millionaires	IHL	11	3	0	3	8	—	—	—	—	—
1929–30	Niagara Falls Cataracts	IHL	12	6	3	9	7	—	—	—	—	—
1929–30	Buffalo Bisons	IHL	19	9	4	13	34	—	—	—	—	—
1930–31	Buffalo Bisons	IHL	47	13	15	28	57	6	2	1	3	2
1931–32	Buffalo Bisons	IHL	48	24	16	40	65	6	3	2	5	4
1932–33	Buffalo Bisons	IHL	42	30	20	50	83	6	4	0	4	2
1933–34	New York Americans	NHL	21	7	3	10	10	—	—	—	—	—
1933–34	Boston Bruins	NHL	6	1	0	1	6	—	—	—	—	—
1933–34	Boston Cubs	Can-Am	3	1	1	2	0	—	—	—	—	—
1933–34	Detroit Red Wings	NHL	13	1	1	2	2	1	0	0	0	0
1934–35	Detroit Red Wings	NHL	6	1	0	1	2	—	—	—	—	—
1934–35	Detroit Olympics	IHL	18	4	6	10	19	—	—	—	—	—
1934–35	Buffalo Bisons	IHL	25	8	11	19	20	—	—	—	—	—
1935–36	Cleveland Falcons	IHL	48	17	10	27	30	2	1	0	1	2
1936–37	Buffalo Bisons	IAHL	3	0	1	1	0	—	—	—	—	—
1936–37	Cleveland Falcons	IAHL	3	0	0	0	2	—	—	—	—	—
1937–38	Tulsa Oilers	AHA	48	24	20	44	36	3	0	0	0	0
1938–39	Tulsa Oilers	AHA	46	29	23	52	30	8	2	4	6	6
1939–40	Tulsa Oilers	AHA	45	13	24	37	24	—	—	—	—	—
1940–41	St. Paul Saints	AHA	48	12	20	32	22	4	0	0	0	5
1941–42	St. Paul Saints	AHA	50	8	9	17	33	2	0	0	0	0
IHL totals			270	114	85	199	323	20	10	3	13	10
NHL totals			52	11	4	15	22	1	0	0	0	0
