= Jim Cain (ice hockey) =

Canadian ice hockey player (1902–1962)

- Born: February 1, 1902 Newmarket, Ontario, Canada
- Died: January 13, 1962 (aged 59)
- Height: 5 ft 8 in (173 cm)
- Weight: 174 lb (79 kg; 12 st 6 lb)
- Position: Defence
- Shot: Right
- Played for: Montreal Maroons; Toronto St. Pats
- Playing career: 1924–1933

James Francis "Dutch" Cain (February 1, 1902 – January 13, 1962) was a Canadian ice hockey defenceman who played two seasons in the National Hockey League for the Toronto St. Pats and Montreal Maroons between 1924 and 1926. The rest of his career, which lasted from 1924 to 1933, was spent in different minor leagues. He was born in Newmarket, Ontario. He was the cousin of Herb Cain.

== Playing career ==
Cain played defence for the Montreal Maroons and the Toronto St. Pats. His NHL career was short-lived, consisting of only 61 regular season games. Cain ultimately found success in the International Hockey League winning two league championships as a member of the Buffalo Bisons. Cain's cousin, Herbert Cain also played in the National Hockey League.

== Career statistics ==
=== Regular season and playoffs ===
| | | | Regular season | | | | | Playoffs |
| Season | Team | League | GP | G | A | Pts | PIM | GP | G | A | Pts | PIM |
|---|---|---|---|---|---|---|---|---|---|---|---|---|
| 1920–21 | Newmarket Redmen | OHA Sr | 10 | 2 | 1 | 3 | — | — | — | — | — | — |
| 1921–22 | Toronto St. Mary's | OHA Jr | 3 | 0 | 0 | 0 | 0 | — | — | — | — | — |
| 1922–23 | Toronto Aura Lee | OHA Jr | 10 | 3 | 5 | 8 | — | — | — | — | — | — |
| 1923–24 | Sault Ste. Marie Greyhounds | NOHA | 4 | 3 | 0 | 3 | 2 | 6 | 1 | 1 | 2 | 6 |
| 1924–25 | Montreal Maroons | NHL | 28 | 4 | 0 | 4 | 27 | — | — | — | — | — |
| 1925–26 | Montreal Maroons | NHL | 10 | 0 | 0 | 0 | 0 | — | — | — | — | — |
| 1925–26 | Toronto St. Pats | NHL | 23 | 0 | 0 | 0 | 8 | — | — | — | — | — |
| 1926–27 | Hamilton Tigers | Can-Pro | 18 | 4 | 0 | 4 | 10 | — | — | — | — | — |
| 1926–27 | Niagara Falls Cataracts | Can-Pro | 14 | 2 | 4 | 6 | 4 | — | — | — | — | — |
| 1927–28 | Toronto Falcons | Can-Pro | 20 | 3 | 2 | 5 | 25 | 2 | 0 | 0 | 0 | 0 |
| 1928–29 | Niagara Falls Cataracts | Can-Pro | 25 | 7 | 3 | 10 | 25 | — | — | — | — | — |
| 1928–29 | Buffalo Bisons | Can-Pro | 15 | 4 | 1 | 5 | 8 | — | — | — | — | — |
| 1929–30 | Buffalo Bisons | IHL | 41 | 3 | 7 | 10 | 22 | 7 | 2 | 3 | 5 | 8 |
| 1930–31 | Buffalo Bisons | IHL | 42 | 3 | 6 | 9 | 18 | 6 | 1 | 0 | 1 | 0 |
| 1931–32 | Buffalo Bisons | IHL | 25 | 1 | 1 | 2 | 13 | 6 | 0 | 0 | 0 | 0 |
| 1932–33 | St. Louis Flyers | AHA | 23 | 1 | 1 | 2 | 16 | — | — | — | — | — |
| 1932–33 | Tulsa Oilers | AHA | 2 | 0 | 0 | 0 | 0 | — | — | — | — | — |
| IHL totals | | | 108 | 7 | 14 | 21 | 53 | 19 | 3 | 3 | 6 | 8 |
| NHL totals | | | 61 | 4 | 0 | 4 | 35 | — | — | — | — | — |
