= Jack Markle =

Canadian ice hockey player

- Born: May 15, 1907; Thessalon, Ontario, Canada
- Died: June 25, 1956 (aged 49)
- Height: 5 ft 9 in (175 cm)
- Weight: 155 lb (70 kg; 11 st 1 lb)
- Position: Right wing
- Shot: Right
- Played for: Toronto Maple Leafs
- Playing career: 1927–1940

John Arthur Markle (May 15, 1907 – June 25, 1956) was a Canadian professional ice hockey player who played eight games in the National Hockey League with the Toronto Maple Leafs during the 1935–36 season. The rest of his career, which lasted from 1927 to 1940, was spent in various minor leagues. He was born in Thessalon, Ontario.

Markle's most notable contributions came with the Syracuse Stars in the International American Hockey League (IAHL). During his time in the IAHL, Markle scored a total of 187 goals and registered 237 assists in 557 games. He also had a solid playoff record, with 14 goals and 11 assists across 37 postseason games.

== Career statistics ==
=== Regular season and playoffs ===
			Regular season					Playoffs
Season	Team	League	GP	G	A	Pts	PIM	GP	G	A	Pts	PIM
1923–24	Owen Sound Greys	OHA	2	0	0	0	0	—	—	—	—	—
1924–25	Owen Sound Collegiate	HS-CA	—	—	—	—	—	—	—	—	—	—
1925–26	Owen Sound Greys	OHA	12	4	1	5	—	8	5	0	5	7
1926–27	Owen Sound Greys	OHA	16	31	8	39	—	—	—	—	—	—
1927–28	London Panthers	Can-Pro	29	3	1	4	60	—	—	—	—	—
1928–29	Hamilton Tigers	Can-Pro	36	12	4	16	10	—	—	—	—	—
1929–30	Hamilton Tigers	IHL	42	12	10	22	21	—	—	—	—	—
1930–31	Syracuse Stars	IHL	48	18	20	38	4	—	—	—	—	—
1931–32	Syracuse Stars	IHL	48	20	13	33	10	—	—	—	—	—
1932–33	Syracuse Stars	IHL	30	8	16	24	6	6	1	2	3	0
1933–34	Syracuse Stars	IHL	42	14	22	36	16	6	4	2	6	2
1934–35	Syracuse Stars	IHL	44	23	20	43	4	2	0	0	0	5
1935–36	Toronto Maple Leafs	NHL	8	0	1	1	0	—	—	—	—	—
1935–36	Syracuse Stars	IHL	43	27	24	51	4	3	0	1	1	0
1936–37	Syracuse Stars	IAHL	50	21	39	60	4	9	2	4	6	0
1937–38	Syracuse Stars	IAHL	48	22	32	54	8	8	5	1	6	0
1938–39	Syracuse Stars	IAHL	53	16	32	48	4	3	2	1	3	0
1939–40	Syracuse Stars	IAHL	45	9	24	33	6	—	—	—	—	—
IHL totals			297	122	125	247	65	17	5	5	10	7
NHL totals			8	0	1	1	0	—	—	—	—	—
