= Frank Steele =

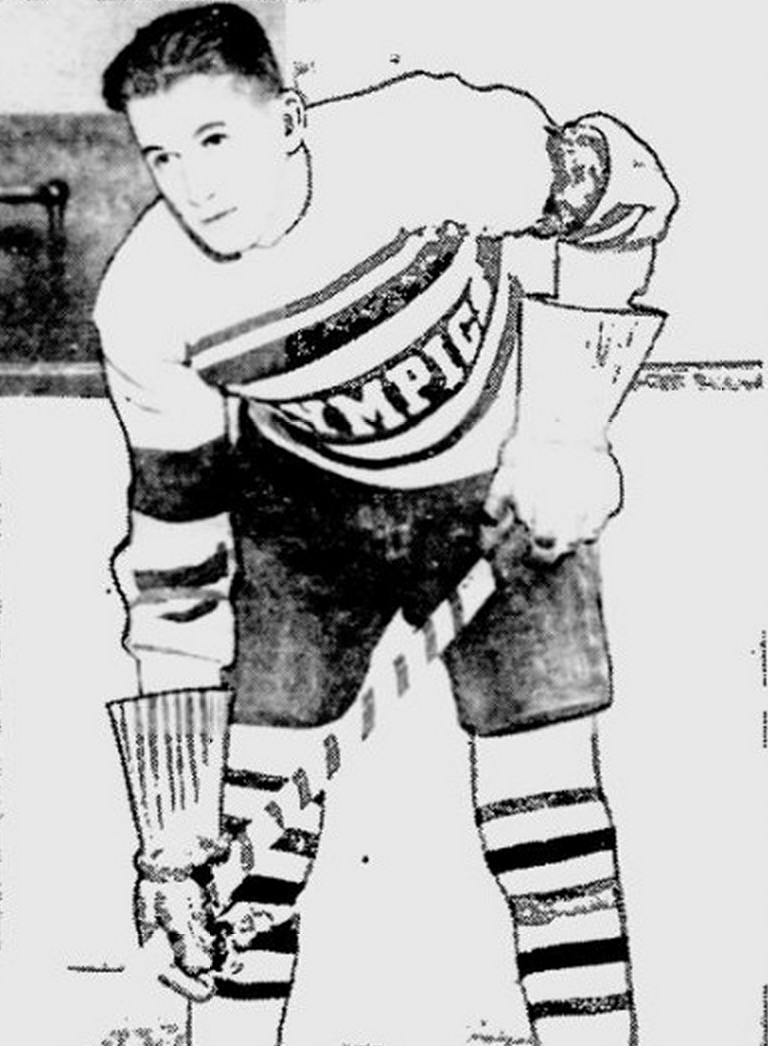
- Born: March 9, 1905 Stamford, Ontario, Canada
- Died: December 3, 1992 (aged 87) Hollywood, Florida, USA
- Height: 5 ft 11 in (180 cm)
- Weight: 170 lb (77 kg; 12 st 2 lb)
- Position: Right wing
- Shot: Right
- Played for: Detroit Falcons
- Playing career: 1927–1940

Harold Franklin Steele (March 9, 1905 – December 3, 1992) was a Canadian ice hockey right winger who played in one National Hockey League game for the Detroit Falcons during the 1930–31 NHL season. He played on December 25, 1930, against the Toronto Maple Leafs, recording 2 penalty minutes. The rest of his career, which lasted from 1927 to 1940, was spent in the minor leagues, primarily in the International Hockey League. Steele died in Hollywood, Florida, in 1992.

== Career statistics ==
=== Regular season and playoffs ===
			Regular season					Playoffs
Season	Team	League	GP	G	A	Pts	PIM	GP	G	A	Pts	PIM
1923–24	Niagara Falls Cataracts	OHA Jr	6	4	0	4	—	—	—	—	—	—
1924–25	Niagara Falls Catracts	OHA Jr	—	—	—	—	—	—	—	—	—	—
1925–26	Niagara Falls Falcons	OHA Int	—	—	—	—	—	—	—	—	—	—
1926–27	Niagara Falls Falcons	OHA Int	—	—	—	—	—	—	—	—	—	—
1926–27	Hamilton Tigers	Can-Pro	5	0	0	0	0	—	—	—	—	—
1927–28	Calumet Miners	NMHL	—	—	—	—	—	—	—	—	—	—
1928–29	Niagara Falls Cataracts	Can-Pro	40	7	2	9	47	—	—	—	—	—
1929–30	Detroit Olympics	IHL	42	15	3	18	47	3	0	0	0	2
1930–31	Detroit Falcons	NHL	1	0	0	0	0	—	—	—	—	—
1930–31	Detroit Olympics	IHL	40	10	6	16	34	—	—	—	—	—
1931–32	Detroit Olympics	IHL	48	7	6	13	44	6	0	0	0	4
1932–33	Detroit Olympics	IHL	16	3	0	3	12	—	—	—	—	—
1932–33	Kansas City Pla-Mors	AHA	7	0	0	0	4	—	—	—	—	—
1932–33	Duluth Hornets/Wichita	AHA	24	0	8	8	17	—	—	—	—	—
1933–34	Windsor Bulldogs	IHL	44	10	13	23	39	—	—	—	—	—
1934–35	Windsor Bulldogs	IHL	43	11	9	20	12	—	—	—	—	—
1935–36	Windsor Bulldogs	IHL	45	9	4	13	30	7	0	1	1	12
1937–38	Detroit Holzbaugh	MOHL	4	1	0	1	4	—	—	—	—	—
1937–38	Detroit Pontiacs	MOHL	20	3	4	7	21	2	0	0	0	5
1938–39	Detroit Pontiacs	MOHL	27	2	5	7	18	7	1	1	2	8
1939–40	Detroit Pontiacs	MOHL	29	1	2	3	13	—	—	—	—	—
IHL totals			278	65	41	106	218	16	0	1	1	18
NHL totals			1	0	0	0	2	—	—	—	—	—

== See also ==
- List of players who played only one game in the NHL

== Bibliography ==
- Frank Steele Game Logs 1930–31, National Hockey League, 2020
