= James Hughes (ice hockey) =

Canadian ice hockey player (1906–1983)

- Born: May 12, 1906; Webbwood, Ontario, Canada
- Died: January 4, 1983 (aged 76)
- Height: 5 ft 9 in (175 cm)
- Weight: 190 lb (86 kg; 13 st 8 lb)
- Position: Defence
- Shot: Right
- Played for: Detroit Cougars
- Playing career: 1925–1937

James Romley Hughes (May 12, 1906 — January 4, 1983) was a Canadian professional ice hockey player who played 40 games in the National Hockey League with the Detroit Cougars during the 1929–30 season. The rest of his career, which lasted from 1925 to 1937, was spent in various minor leagues.

== Career statistics ==
=== Regular season and playoffs ===
			Regular season					Playoffs
Season	Team	League	GP	G	A	Pts	PIM	GP	G	A	Pts	PIM
1924–25	Cobalt Junior Miners	NOJHA	—	—	—	—	—	—	—	—	—	—
1925–26	Winnipeg Maroons	AHA	24	1	3	4	18	5	2	2	4	0
1926–27	Winnipeg Maroons	AHA	10	2	0	2	2	—	—	—	—	—
1926–27	Windsor Hornets	Can-Pro	1	1	0	1	0	—	—	—	—	—
1927–28	Windsor Bulldogs	Can-Pro	18	0	2	2	17	—	—	—	—	—
1927–28	Niagara Falls Cataracts	Can-Pro	16	0	0	0	34	—	—	—	—	—
1928–29	Buffalo Bisons	Can-Pro	40	4	1	5	79	—	—	—	—	—
1929–30	Detroit Cougars	NHL	40	0	1	1	60	—	—	—	—	—
1930–31	Detroit Olympics	IHL	7	0	0	0	4	—	—	—	—	—
1930–31	Syracuse Stars	IHL	39	1	2	3	75	—	—	—	—	—
1931–32	Syracuse Stars	IHL	48	1	2	3	80	—	—	—	—	—
1932–33	St. Louis Flyers	AHA	44	1	0	1	38	4	0	1	1	6
1933–34	Syracuse Stars	IHL	43	2	2	4	76	6	1	0	1	2
1934–35	Syracuse Stars	IHL	28	0	2	2	37	—	—	—	—	—
1934–35	Windsor Bulldogs	IHL	14	0	2	2	22	—	—	—	—	—
1935–36	Windsor Bulldogs	IHL	12	0	1	1	6	—	—	—	—	—
1935–36	Pittsburgh Shamrocks	IHL	32	1	4	5	48	—	—	—	—	—
1936–37	Kansas City Greyhounds	AHA	41	0	1	1	56	3	0	0	0	11
IHL totals			223	5	15	20	348	6	1	0	1	2
NHL totals			40	0	1	1	60	—	—	—	—	—
