= Mike Neville (ice hockey) =

Canadian ice hockey player

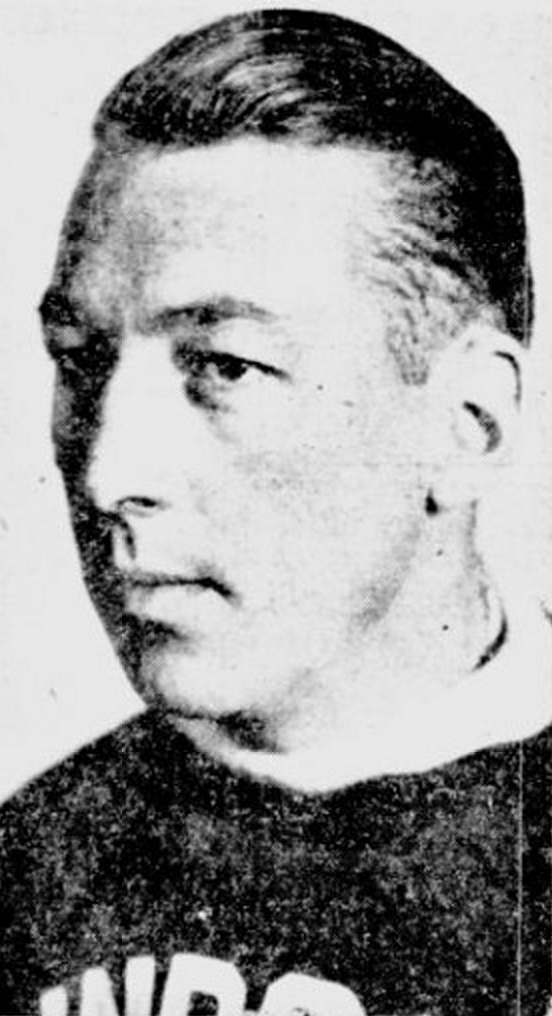
- Born: October 11, 1902; Grand-Mère, Québec, Canada
- Died: January 16, 1958 (aged 55); Grand-Mère, Québec, Canada
- Height: 5 ft 9 in (175 cm)
- Weight: 170 lb (77 kg; 12 st 2 lb)
- Position: Center
- Shot: Right
- Played for: Toronto St. Pats; New York Americans
- Playing career: 1924–1931

Mike Neville (baptised Michel-Joseph Neville; October 11, 1902 — January 16, 1958) was a Canadian ice hockey centreman who played three seasons in the National Hockey League for the Toronto St. Pats, and New York Americans between 1924 and 1931. The rest of his career, which lasted from 1924 to 1936, was spent in various minor leagues. He died in 1958 and was buried at Cimetière Saint-Paul de Grand-Mère, in the City of Shawinigan.

== Career statistics ==
=== Regular season and playoffs ===
			Regular season					Playoffs
Season	Team	League	GP	G	A	Pts	PIM	GP	G	A	Pts	PIM
1921–22	Grande'Mere Maroons	QPHL	8	7	0	7	—	—	—	—	—	—
1922–23	Quebec Sons of Ireland	QPHL	8	2	0	2	—	5	1	0	1	—
1923–24	Trois-Riveres Lions	QPHL	10	2	0	2	—	—	—	—	—	—
1924–25	Toronto St. Pats	NHL	13	1	2	3	4	2	0	0	0	0
1925–26	Toronto St. Pats	NHL	33	3	3	6	8	—	—	—	—	—
1926–27	Hamilton Tigers	Can-Pro	32	15	4	19	38	2	0	0	0	0
1927–28	Hamilton Tigers	Can-Pro	11	8	3	11	15	—	—	—	—	—
1927–28	Stratford Nationals	Can-Pro	29	10	6	16	10	5	2	2	4	4
1928–29	Windsor Bulldogs	IHL	38	14	7	21	18	8	2	5	7	6
1929–30	Windsor Bulldogs	IHL	39	11	17	28	20	—	—	—	—	—
1930–31	New York Americans	NHL	19	1	0	1	2	—	—	—	—	—
1930–31	New Haven Eagles	Can-Am	12	1	3	4	10	—	—	—	—	—
1930–31	London Tecumsehs	IHL	19	2	5	7	15	—	—	—	—	—
1931–32	London Tecumsehs	IHL	48	10	11	21	25	5	0	0	0	2
1932–33	London Tecumsehs	IHL	42	9	8	17	15	6	1	2	3	0
1933–34	Cleveland Indians/Syracuse Stars	IHL	41	3	3	6	13	5	0	1	1	0
1934–35	Calgary Tigers/Portland Buckaroos	NWHL	24	6	6	12	6	—	—	—	—	—
1935–36	Rochester Cardinals	IHL	39	2	2	4	4	—	—	—	—	—
IHL totals			228	37	46	83	92	16	1	3	4	2
NHL totals			65	5	5	10	14	2	0	0	0	0

== Transactions ==
- Signed as a free agent by the Toronto St. Pats, January 14, 1925.
- Traded by the Montreal Maroons (Windsor-IHL) with Frank Carson, Red Dutton and Hap Emms to the New York Americans for $35,000, May 14, 1930.
