= Fred Brown (ice hockey) =

Canadian ice hockey player

- Born: September 15, 1900; Kingston, Ontario, Canada
- Died: January 20, 1970 (aged 69)
- Height: 5 ft 8 in (173 cm)
- Weight: 155 lb (70 kg; 11 st 1 lb)
- Position: Left wing
- Shot: Left
- Played for: Montreal Maroons
- Playing career: 1924–1931

Frederick Henry "Baldy" Brown (September 15, 1900 — January 20, 1970), known as Fred Brown, was a Canadian professional ice hockey player who played nine games in the National Hockey League with the Montreal Maroons during the 1927–28 season. The rest of his career, which lasted from 1924 to 1931, was spent in various minor leagues. He was born in Kingston, Ontario.

== Career statistics ==
=== Regular season and playoffs ===
			Regular season					Playoffs
Season	Team	League	GP	G	A	Pts	PIM	GP	G	A	Pts	PIM
1923–24	Brockville Indians	OHA	—	—	—	—	—	—	—	—	—	—
1924–25	Hamilton Rowing Club	OHA Sr	8	10	3	13	—	—	—	—	—	—
1925–26	Windsor Hornets	OHA Sr	20	15	4	19	8	—	—	—	—	—
1926–27	Windsor Hornets	Can-Pro	29	9	3	12	16	—	—	—	—	—
1927–28	Stratford Nationals	Can-Pro	16	6	5	11	2	—	—	—	—	—
1927–28	Windsor Hornets	Can-Pro	13	5	2	7	9	—	—	—	—	—
1927–28	Montreal Maroons	NHL	15	1	0	1	0	9	0	0	0	0
1928–29	Kitchener Flying Dutchmen	Can-Pro	40	15	6	21	56	3	0	0	0	2
1929–30	Niagara Falls Cataracts	IHL	16	2	0	2	25	—	—	—	—	—
1929–30	Windsor Bulldogs	IHL	24	3	3	6	18	—	—	—	—	—
1930–31	Syracuse Stars	IHL	48	15	7	22	39	—	—	—	—	—
Can-Pro totals			98	35	16	51	83	3	0	0	0	2
IHL totals			88	20	10	30	82	—	—	—	—	—
NHL totals			15	1	0	1	0	9	0	0	0	0
