= Pete Bellefeuille =

Canadian ice hockey player

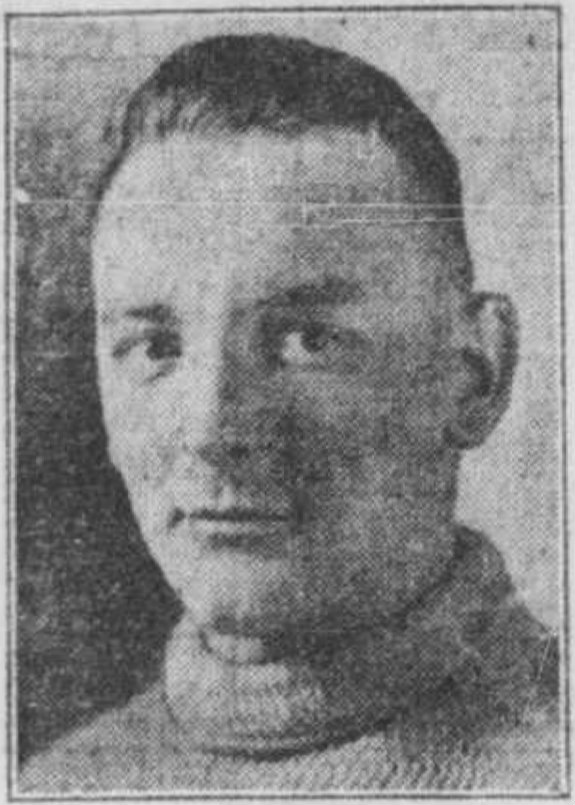
- Pete Bellefeuille c. 1924
- Born: October 16, 1900; Trois-Rivières, Quebec, Canada
- Died: July 14, 1970 (aged 69); Trois-Rivières, Quebec, Canada
- Height: 5 ft 10 in (178 cm)
- Weight: 180 lb (82 kg; 12 st 12 lb)
- Position: Right wing
- Shot: Right
- Played for: Toronto St. Pats; Toronto Maple Leafs; Detroit Cougars
- Playing career: 1925–1932

Joseph Jean-Baptiste Édouard Pierre "Pete" Bellefeuille (October 16, 1900 – July 14, 1970), nicknamed "The Fleeting Frenchman", was a Canadian professional ice hockey right winger who played 5 seasons in the National Hockey League for the Toronto St. Pats, Toronto Maple Leafs, and Detroit Cougars between 1925 and 1930. In 1963, Bellefeuille was coaching a hockey team in Trois-Rivieres.

== Career statistics ==
=== Regular season and playoffs ===
			Regular season					Playoffs
Season	Team	League	GP	G	A	Pts	PIM	GP	G	A	Pts	PIM
1920–21	Quebec Voltigeurs	QCHL	11	17	0	17	—	4	0	1	1	—
1921–22	Quebec Voltigeurs	QCHL	—	—	—	—	—	—	—	—	—	—
1922–23	Trois-Riveieres Violettes	QPHL	4	7	0	7	—	—	—	—	—	—
1922–23	Trois-Riveieres Violettes	Big-4	7	9	0	9	—	3	4	0	4	—
1923–24	Iroquois Falls Papermakers	NOHA	8	10	4	14	12	—	—	—	—	—
1924–25	London AAA	OHA Sr	11	9	4	13	27	—	—	—	—	—
1925–26	Toronto St. Pats	NHL	36	14	2	16	22	—	—	—	—	—
1926–27	Toronto St. Pats/Maple Leafs	NHL	13	0	0	0	12	—	—	—	—	—
1926–27	London Panthers	Can-Pro	6	4	0	4	4	—	—	—	—	—
1926–27	Detroit Cougars	NHL	18	6	0	6	14	—	—	—	—	—
1927–28	Detroit Olympics	Can-Pro	42	20	6	26	75	2	1	0	1	12
1928–29	Detroit Cougars	NHL	1	1	0	1	0	—	—	—	—	—
1928–29	Detroit Olympics	Can-Pro	42	19	5	24	43	2	1	0	1	2
1929–30	Detroit Cougars	NHL	24	5	2	7	10	—	—	—	—	—
1929–30	Detroit Olympics	IHL	18	6	4	10	13	2	0	0	0	2
1930–31	Seattle Eskimos	PCHL	34	12	1	13	12	4	2	0	2	6
1931–32	Syracuse Stars	IHL	6	1	1	2	4	—	—	—	—	—
1931–32	Trois-Rivieres Renards	ECHA	24	8	10	18	29	—	—	—	—	—
1933–34	Quebec Castors	Can-Am	1	0	0	0	0	—	—	—	—	—
NHL totals			92	26	4	30	58	—	—	—	—	—
