= Andy Bellemer =

Canadian ice hockey player

- Born: July 3, 1903; Penetanguishene, Ontario, Canada
- Died: April 12, 1960 (aged 56); Sudbury, Ontario, Canada
- Height: 5 ft 11 in (180 cm)
- Weight: 185 lb (84 kg; 13 st 3 lb)
- Position: Defence
- Shot: Left
- Played for: Montreal Maroons
- Playing career: 1925–19242

Andrew Edward Bellemer (July 3, 1903 – April 12, 1960) was a Canadian professional ice hockey player who played 15 games in the National Hockey League with the Montreal Maroons during the 1932–33 season. The rest of his career, which lasted from 1925 to 1943, was spent in various minor leagues. He was born in Penetanguishene, Ontario.

== Career statistics ==
=== Regular season and playoffs ===
			Regular season					Playoffs
Season	Team	League	GP	G	A	Pts	PIM	GP	G	A	Pts	PIM
1925–26	New Hamburg Sailors	OHA Sr	—	—	—	—	—	—	—	—	—	—
1926–27	Windsor Hornets	Can-Pro	32	4	0	4	88	—	—	—	—	—
1927–28	Windsor Hornets	Can-Pro	38	5	3	8	110	—	—	—	—	—
1928–29	Windsor Hornets	Can-Pro	41	3	1	4	75	8	0	0	0	19
1929–30	Windsor Bulldogs	IHL	41	6	2	8	49	—	—	—	—	—
1930–31	Windsor Bulldogs	IHL	47	6	5	11	114	6	0	2	2	6
1931–32	Windsor Bulldogs	IHL	21	0	2	2	59	—	—	—	—	—
1931–32	Cleveland Indians	IHL	20	2	3	5	49	—	—	—	—	—
1932–33	Montreal Maroons	NHL	15	0	0	0	0	—	—	—	—	—
1932–33	Cleveland Indians	IHL	26	0	1	1	78	—	—	—	—	—
1933–34	Windsor Bulldogs	IHL	42	2	3	5	79	6	1	0	1	27
1934–35	Kansas City Greyhounds	AHA	41	4	4	8	59	2	0	0	0	2
1935–36	Rochester Cardinals	IHL	45	0	8	8	80	—	—	—	—	—
1936–37	Tulsa Oilers	AHA	46	9	6	15	64	—	—	—	—	—
1937–38	Tulsa Oilers	AHA	43	3	9	12	37	4	0	0	0	0
1938–39	Tulsa Oilers	AHA	48	2	13	15	65	8	1	0	1	10
1939–40	Tulsa Oilers	AHA	43	4	7	11	51	—	—	—	—	—
1940–41	Tulsa Oilers	AHA	48	3	7	10	67	—	—	—	—	—
1941–42	Tulsa Oilers	AHA	33	2	8	10	20	—	—	—	—	—
1941–42	Dallas Texans	AHA	15	2	5	7	24	—	—	—	—	—
1942–43	Toronto Research Colonels	OHA Sr	1	0	0	0	2	—	—	—	—	—
1942–43	Toronto Dehavillands	TMHL	14	2	5	7	32	4	0	0	0	12
AHA totals			317	29	59	88	387	14	1	0	1	12
NHL totals			15	0	0	0	0	—	—	—	—	—
