= Pete Palangio =

Canadian ice hockey player

- Born: September 10, 1908 North Bay, Ontario, Canada
- Died: December 24, 2004 (aged 96) North Bay, Ontario, Canada
- Height: 5 ft 11 in (180 cm)
- Weight: 175 lb (79 kg; 12 st 7 lb)
- Position: Left wing
- Shot: Left
- Played for: Montreal Canadiens; Detroit Cougars; Chicago Black Hawks
- Playing career: 1926–1943

Peter Albert Palangio (September 10, 1908 – December 24, 2004) was a Canadian ice hockey player who played 70 games in the National Hockey League with the Montreal Canadiens, Detroit Cougars and Chicago Black Hawks between 1926 and 1938. Born in North Bay, Ontario, he won the Stanley Cup in 1938 with Chicago as number 18. He died December 24, 2004, in North Bay, Ontario. He was the last surviving member of the Black Hawks' 1938 Stanley Cup team as well as the last surviving Detroit Cougars player.

== Regular season and playoffs ==
			Regular season					Playoffs
Season	Team	League	GP	G	A	Pts	PIM	GP	G	A	Pts	PIM
1926–27	North Bay Trappers	NOHA	11	25	10	35	24	4	9	3	12	4
1926–27	Montreal Canadiens	NHL	6	0	0	0	0	4	0	0	0	0
1927–28	Windsor Hornets	Can-Pro	28	16	1	17	18	—	—	—	—	—
1927–28	Detroit Cougars	NHL	14	3	0	3	8	—	—	—	—	—
1928–29	Montreal Canadiens	NHL	2	0	0	0	0	—	—	—	—	—
1928–29	Kitchener Flying Dutchmen	Can-Pro	37	17	7	24	26	3	1	0	1	4
1929–30	London Panthers	IHL	44	11	6	17	36	2	0	0	0	0
1930–31	London Tecumsehs	IHL	3	2	0	2	0	—	—	—	—	—
1930–31	Syracuse Stars	IHL	41	18	12	30	12	—	—	—	—	—
1931–32	Syracuse Stars	IHL	43	12	5	17	18	—	—	—	—	—
1932–33	St. Louis Flyers	AHA	43	21	14	35	38	4	0	1	1	2
1933–34	St. Louis Flyers	AHA	48	21	9	30	22	7	3	1	4	6
1934–35	St. Louis Flyers	AHA	47	34	19	53	8	6	4	3	7	11
1935–36	St. Louis Flyers	AHA	48	22	20	42	38	8	5	1	6	8
1936–37	St. Louis Flyers	AHA	16	12	12	24	4	—	—	—	—	—
1936–37	Chicago Black Hawks	NHL	30	8	9	17	16	—	—	—	—	—
1937–38	Chicago Black Hawks	NHL	19	2	1	3	4	3	0	0	0	0
1937–38	St. Louis Flyers	AHA	25	8	13	21	9	7	3	0	3	2
1938–39	Tulsa Oilers	AHA	34	12	18	30	16	8	1	3	4	2
1939–40	Tulsa Oilers	AHA	46	21	27	48	14	—	—	—	—	—
1940–41	Tulsa Oilers	AHA	48	12	21	33	17	—	—	—	—	—
1941–42	Dallas Texans	AHA	49	22	29	51	6	—	—	—	—	—
1942–43	Hershey Bears	AHL	5	0	1	1	0	—	—	—	—	—
1942–43	Pittsburgh Hornets	AHL	29	6	18	24	4	2	1	0	1	2
1943–44	Sudbury Open Pit Miners	NBHL	1	0	1	1	0	—	—	—	—	—
1944–45	North Bay Merchants	NBHL	—	23	12	35	—	—	—	—	—	—
1945–46	North Bay Rangers	NBHL	—	—	—	—	—	—	—	—	—	—
1946–47	North Bay Rangers	NBHL	—	—	—	—	—	—	—	—	—	—
1947–48	North Bay Black Hawks	NBHL	14	19	22	41	—	6	8	7	15	2
1947–48	North Bay Black Hawks	Al-Cup	—	—	—	—	—	5	3	5	8	—
1948–49	North Bay Black Hawks	NBHL	8	4	2	6	0	—	—	—	—	—
AHA totals			404	185	182	367	172	40	16	9	25	31
NHL totals			71	13	10	23	28	7	0	0	0	0
