= Gord McFarlane =

Canadian ice hockey player

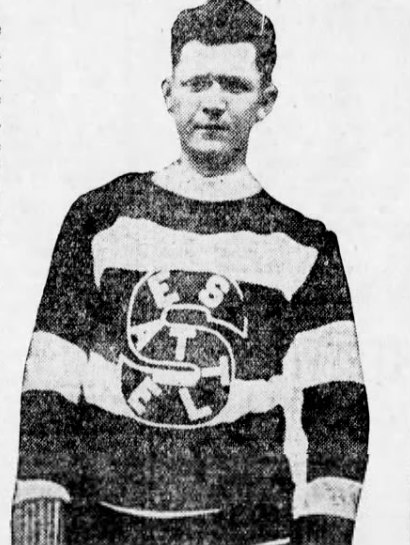
- McFarlane with the Seattle Metropolitans
- Born: July 18, 1901 Snowflake, Manitoba, Canada
- Died: March 2, 1987 (aged 85) Calgary, Alberta, Canada
- Height: 6 ft 2 in (188 cm)
- Weight: 180 lb (82 kg; 12 st 12 lb)
- Position: Right wing
- Shot: Right
- Played for: Chicago Black Hawks
- Playing career: 1919–1938

Gordon Lester McFarlane (July 18, 1901 — March 2, 1987) was a Canadian ice hockey right winger from Snowflake, Manitoba. He played 28 games in the Pacific Coast Hockey Association with the Seattle Metropolitans in the 1923–24 season, 53 games in the Western Canada Hockey League/Western Hockey League with the Vancouver Maroons and Calgary Tigers during the 1924–25 and 1925–26 seasons, and 2 games in the National Hockey League for the Chicago Black Hawks during the 1926–27 season.

The rest of his career, which lasted from 1919 to 1938, was spent in various minor leagues.

== Career statistics ==
=== Regular season and playoffs ===
			Regular season					Playoffs
Season	Team	League	GP	G	A	Pts	PIM	GP	G	A	Pts	PIM
1918–19	Edmonton Victorias	CA-HS	—	—	—	—	—	—	—	—	—	—
1919–20	Calgary Columbus Club	B-4	9	1	1	2	2	—	—	—	—	—
1920–21	Calgary Fourex	CCSHL	—	—	—	—	—	—	—	—	—	—
1921–22	Calgary Fourex	CCSHL	—	—	—	—	—	—	—	—	—	—
1922–23	Calgary Fourex	CCSHL	—	—	—	—	—	—	—	—	—	—
1923–24	Seattle Metropolitans	PCHA	28	4	1	5	36	2	1	0	1	2
1924–25	Vancouver Maroons	WCHL	5	1	0	1	0	—	—	—	—	—
1924–25	Calgary Tigers	WCHL	21	6	1	7	24	2	0	0	0	0
1925–26	Calgary Tigers	WHL	27	6	1	7	22	—	—	—	—	—
1926–27	Chicago Black Hawks	NHL	2	0	0	0	0	—	—	—	—	—
1926–27	Springfield Indians	Can-Am	23	5	0	5	26	3	0	0	0	2
1927–28	Kitchener Millionaires	Can-Pro	38	12	3	15	82	5	0	0	0	8
1928–29	Kitchener Flying Dutchmen	Can-Pro	42	7	10	17	102	6	1	0	1	10
1929–30	Cleveland Indians	IHL	42	9	7	16	97	3	0	0	0	4
1930–31	Cleveland Indians	IHL	48	5	9	14	95	6	1	1	2	6
1931–32	Cleveland Indians	IHL	26	5	5	10	44	—	—	—	—	—
1932–33	Cleveland Indians	IHL	40	5	7	12	53	—	—	—	—	—
1933–34	Portland Buckaroos	NWHL	18	2	1	3	8	—	—	—	—	—
1934–35	Vancouver Lions	NWHL	33	9	5	14	39	5	0	0	0	4
1935–36	Calgary Tigers	NWHL	40	11	10	21	37	—	—	—	—	—
1937–38	Calgary Rangers	ASHL	26	9	16	25	37	6	2	1	3	10
PCHA totals			28	4	1	5	36	2	1	0	1	2
WCHL/WHL totals			53	13	2	15	46	2	0	0	0	0
NHL totals			2	0	0	0	0	—	—	—	—	—
