= Bernie Brophy =

Canadian ice hockey player

- Born: August 9, 1903 Collingwood, Ontario, Canada
- Died: July 19, 1982 (aged 78)
- Height: 5 ft 8 in (173 cm)
- Weight: 165 lb (75 kg; 11 st 11 lb)
- Position: Left wing
- Shot: Left
- Played for: Detroit Cougars; Montreal Maroons
- Playing career: 1925–1936

Bernard Leo Brophy (August 9, 1903 – July 19, 1982) was a Canadian professional ice hockey player who played 62 games in the National Hockey League between 1925 and 1929. He was born in Collingwood, Ontario. He played with the Montreal Maroons and Detroit Cougars. The rest of his career, which lasted from 1925 to 1936, was spent in various minor leagues. He won a Stanley Cup with the Maroons in 1926.

Brophy's daughter Carol Brophy-Collins was a skating instructor to NHL teams and players like Dave Andreychuk and Nick Kypreos. She was the guest coach at the National Hockey League's officials' training camp in Toronto, and coached players from the Buffalo Sabres, Rochester Americans of the American Hockey League and the Oshawa Generals of the OHA.

== Career statistics ==
=== Regular season and playoffs ===
			Regular season					Playoffs
Season	Team	League	GP	G	A	Pts	PIM	GP	G	A	Pts	PIM
1922–23	Collingwood	OHA Jr	—	—	—	—	—	—	—	—	—	—
1923–24	Toronto St. Mary's	OHA Sr	8	1	0	1	—	—	—	—	—	—
1924–25	Fort Pitt Hornets	USAHA	17	4	0	4	—	5	0	0	0	—
1925–26	Montreal Maroons	NHL	10	0	0	0	0	—	—	—	—	—
1926–27	Detroit Greyhounds	AHA	1	0	0	0	0	—	—	—	—	—
1926–27	Duluth Hornets	AHA	1	0	0	0	0	—	—	—	—	—
1926–27	Providence Reds	Can-Am	10	5	0	5	8	—	—	—	—	—
1927–28	Providence Reds	Can-Am	33	9	2	11	31	—	—	—	—	—
1928–29	Detroit Cougars	NHL	37	2	4	6	23	2	0	0	0	2
1928–29	Detroit Olympics	Can-Pro	10	3	4	7	12	—	—	—	—	—
1929–30	Detroit Cougars	NHL	15	2	0	2	2	—	—	—	—	—
1929–30	Detroit Olympics	IHL	25	14	5	19	26	3	0	0	0	6
1930–31	Detroit Olympics	IHL	35	11	5	16	38	—	—	—	—	—
1931–32	Cleveland Indians	IHL	46	15	13	28	60	—	—	—	—	—
1932–33	Cleveland Indians	IHL	23	13	5	18	20	—	—	—	—	—
1933–34	London Tecumsehs	IHL	37	9	5	14	19	6	4	0	4	4
1934–35	London Techumsehs	IHL	34	12	10	22	20	5	1	4	5	0
1935–36	Windsor Bulldogs	IHL	41	6	6	12	11	5	0	1	1	0
1936–37	Collingwood Shippers	OHA Sr	—	—	—	—	—	—	—	—	—	—
1937–38	Collingwood Shippers	OHA Sr	—	—	—	—	—	—	—	—	—	—
1938–39	Collingwood Shippers	OHA Sr	—	—	—	—	—	—	—	—	—	—
IHL totals			241	80	49	129	194	19	5	5	10	10
NHL totals			62	4	4	8	25	2	0	0	0	2
