= Mickey McGuire (ice hockey) =

Canadian ice hockey player

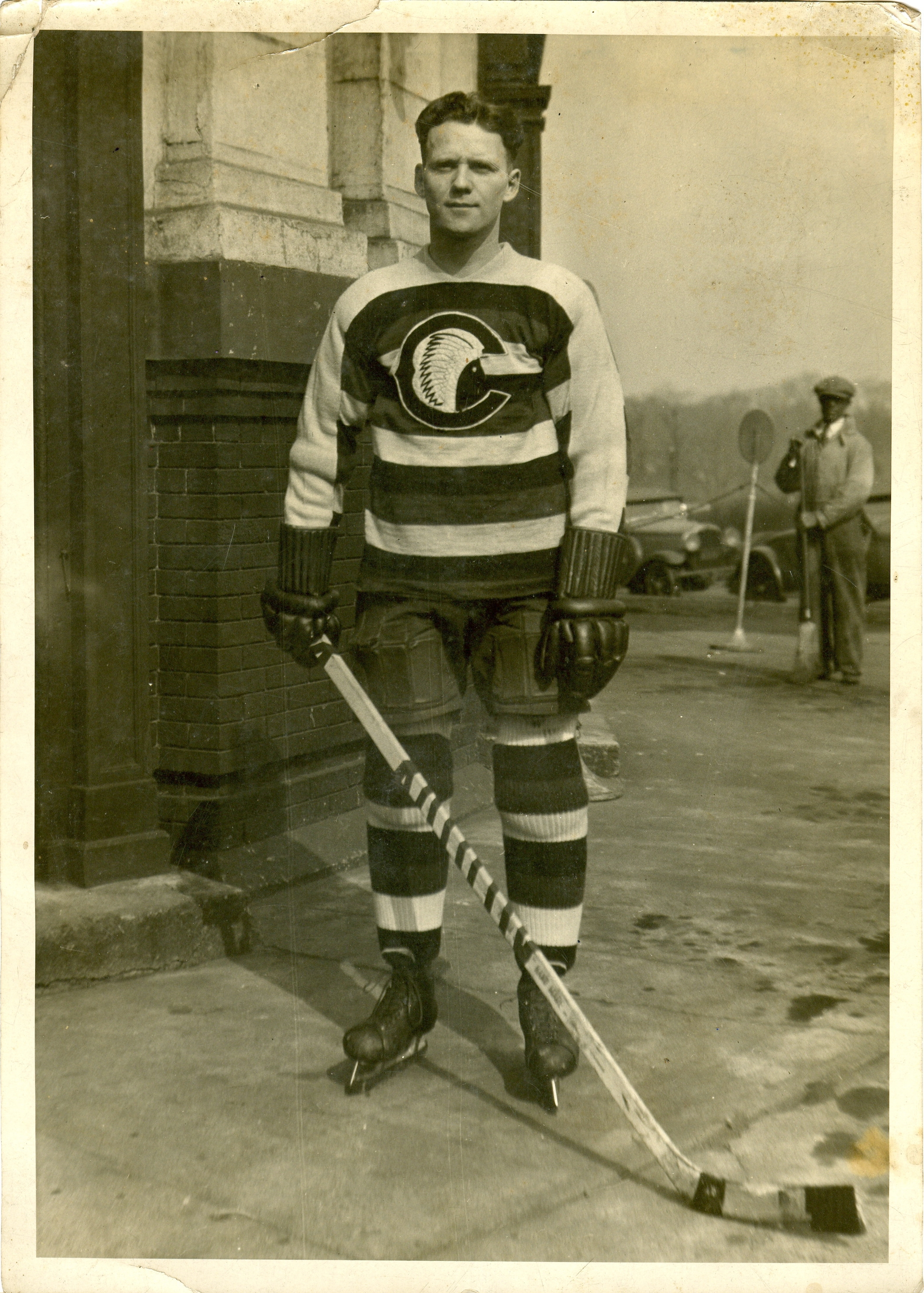
- McGuire with Cleveland Indians in 1929
- Born: July 7, 1898 Gravenhurst, Ontario, Canada
- Died: May 23, 1968 (aged 69) Windsor, Ontario, Canada
- Height: 5 ft 10 in (178 cm)
- Weight: 158 lb (72 kg; 11 st 4 lb)
- Position: Left wing
- Shot: Left
- Played for: Pittsburgh Pirates
- Playing career: 1924–1932

Frank Stewart "Mickey" McGuire (July 7, 1898 – May 23, 1968) was a Canadian professional ice hockey forward who played 36 games in the National Hockey League for the Pittsburgh Pirates. He was born in Gravenhurst, Ontario.

After retiring from hockey, McGuire became a competitive bowler, residing in Windsor, Ontario. He also worked for Chrysler. He died in 1968 after a long illness at a hospital in Windsor, Ontario.

== Career statistics ==
=== Regular season and playoffs ===
| | | | Regular season | | | | | Playoffs |
| Season | Team | League | GP | G | A | Pts | PIM | GP | G | A | Pts | PIM |
|---|---|---|---|---|---|---|---|---|---|---|---|---|
| 1920–21 | Timmins Gold Miners | GBHL | — | — | — | — | — | 2 | 3 | 0 | 3 | 0 |
| 1921–22 | Timmins Gold Miners | GBHL | — | — | — | — | — | — | — | — | — | — |
| 1922–23 | Porcupine Gold Miners | GBHL | — | — | — | — | — | — | — | — | — | — |
| 1923–24 | Cleveland Indians | USAHA | 20 | 11 | 5 | 16 | — | 8 | 1 | 1 | 2 | — |
| 1924–25 | Cleveland Blues | USAHA | 38 | 9 | 0 | 9 | — | — | — | — | — | — |
| 1925–26 | Minneapolis Millers | CHL | 29 | 6 | 5 | 11 | 58 | 3 | 2 | 1 | 3 | 8 |
| 1926–27 | Pittsburgh Pirates | NHL | 32 | 3 | 0 | 3 | 6 | — | — | — | — | — |
| 1927–28 | Pittsburgh Pirates | NHL | 4 | 0 | 0 | 0 | 0 | — | — | — | — | — |
| 1927–28 | Windsor Hornets | Can-Pro | 33 | 16 | 3 | 19 | 31 | — | — | — | — | — |
| 1928–29 | Windsor Hornets | Can-Pro | 18 | 3 | 0 | 3 | 4 | — | — | — | — | — |
| 1928–29 | London Panthers | Can-Pro | 21 | 3 | 1 | 4 | 18 | — | — | — | — | — |
| 1929–30 | Cleveland Indians | IHL | 39 | 11 | 6 | 17 | 30 | 6 | 1 | 0 | 1 | 0 |
| 1930–31 | Cleveland Indians | IHL | 4 | 0 | 0 | 0 | 0 | — | — | — | — | — |
| 1930–31 | Pittsburgh Yellow Jackets | IHL | 39 | 7 | 4 | 11 | 31 | 5 | 1 | 1 | 2 | 2 |
| 1931–32 | Cleveland Indians | IHL | 18 | 2 | 1 | 3 | 2 | — | — | — | — | — |
| NHL totals | | | 36 | 3 | 0 | 3 | 6 | — | — | — | — | — |
