= Bill Holmes (ice hockey) =

Canadian ice hockey player

- Born: February 9, 1899; Portage la Prairie, Manitoba, Canada
- Died: March 14, 1961 (aged 62) near Ridgeway, Ontario, Canada
- Height: 6 ft 0 in (183 cm)
- Weight: 200 lb (91 kg; 14 st 4 lb)
- Position: Centre
- Shot: Right
- Played for: Montreal Canadiens; New York Americans; Edmonton Eskimos
- Playing career: 1921–1936

William Orser Holmes (February 9, 1899 – March 14, 1961) was a Canadian ice hockey centre who played 51 games in the National Hockey League (NHL) for the Montreal Canadiens and the New York Americans between 1925 and 1930. The rest of his career, which lasted from 1921 to 1936, was spent in various minor leagues.

Holmes was born in Portage la Prairie, a city in the Central Plains Region of Manitoba.

== Career statistics ==
=== Regular season and playoffs ===
			Regular season					Playoffs
Season	Team	League	GP	G	A	Pts	PIM	GP	G	A	Pts	PIM
1921–22	Brandon Elks	MHL	12	8	1	9	4	2	0	0	0	6
1921–22	Brandon Elks	Al-Cup	—	—	—	—	—	4	4	1	5	0
1922–23	Brandon Elks	MHL	16	16	2	18	19	—	—	—	—	—
1923–24	Brandon Wheat Kings	MHL	11	1	2	3	5	3	0	1	1	6
1924–25	Edmonton Eskimos	WCHL	6	0	0	0	0	—	—	—	—	—
1925–26	Montreal Canadiens	NHL	9	1	0	1	4	—	—	—	—	—
1926–27	Niagara Falls Cataracts	Can-Pro	25	20	4	25	51	—	—	—	—	—
1927–28	Niagara Falls Cataracts	Can-Pro	18	8	2	10	46	—	—	—	—	—
1927–28	London Panthers	Can-Pro	23	14	2	16	42	—	—	—	—	—
1928–29	New Haven Eagles	Can-Am	38	9	6	15	76	2	1	0	1	8
1929–30	New York Americans	NHL	42	5	4	9	33	—	—	—	—	—
1930–31	Syracuse Stars	IHL	48	19	37	56	61	—	—	—	—	—
1931–32	Buffalo Majors	AHA	19	1	0	1	6	—	—	—	—	—
1931–32	Cleveland Indians	IHL	1	0	0	0	0	—	—	—	—	—
1931–32	Pittsburgh Yellowjackets	IHL	5	1	0	1	2	—	—	—	—	—
1933–34	Syracuse Stars	IHL	16	3	2	5	4	—	—	—	—	—
1934–35	London Tecumsehs	IHL	6	1	1	2	6	—	—	—	—	—
1934–35	New Haven Eagles	Can-Am	39	11	19	30	11	—	—	—	—	—
1935–36	Pittsburgh Shamrocks	IHL	21	1	4	5	8	—	—	—	—	—
NHL totals			51	6	4	10	37	—	—	—	—	—
