= Herb Stuart =

Canadian ice hockey player (1899–1981)

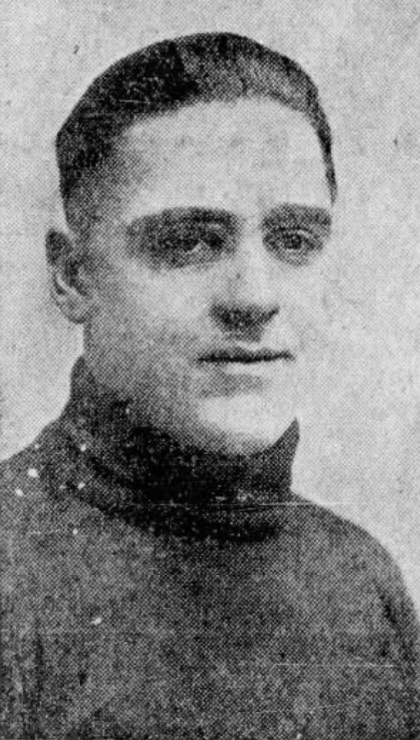
- Stuart c. 1922
- Born: March 30, 1899 Brantford, Ontario, Canada
- Died: January 12, 1981 (aged 81) Toronto, Ontario, Canada
- Height: 5 ft 6 in (168 cm)
- Weight: 175 lb (79 kg; 12 st 7 lb)
- Position: Goaltender
- Caught: Left
- Played for: Edmonton Eskimos
- Playing career: 1919–1936

Herbert Neville Stuart (March 30, 1899 — he was buried January 12, 1981) was a Canadian professional ice hockey goaltender from Brantford, Ontario, who played from 1919 to 1936 in various professional and amateur leagues.

== Career ==
While Stuart primarily played in the minor International Hockey League, he played 3 games in the National Hockey League during the 1926–27 season for the Detroit Cougars, and two seasons with the Edmonton Eskimos of the Western Canada Hockey League between 1924 and 1926.

== Career statistics ==
=== Regular season and playoffs ===
			Regular season								Playoffs
Season	Team	League	GP	W	L	T	Min	GA	SO	GAA	GP	W	L	T	Min	GA	SO	GAA
1916–17	Brantford Alexanders	OHA	4	3	1	0	240	15	0	3.75	2	0	1	1	120	7	0	3.50
1917–18	Paris AAA	OHA	5	5	0	0	300	11	0	2.20	2	1	1	0	120	14	0	7.00
1918–19	Paris AAA	OHA	—	—	—	—	—	—	—	—	—	—	—	—	—	—	—	—
1919–20	Brandon Elks	MHL	2	0	2	0	120	18	0	9.00	—	—	—	—	—	—	—	—
1919–20	Brandon Elks	Al-Cup	—	—	—	—	—	—	—	—	5	4	1	0	300	19	2	3.80
1920–21	Brandon Elks	MHL	11	7	4	0	660	47	0	4.27	—	—	—	—	—	—	—	—
1920–21	Brandon Elks	Al-Cup	—	—	—	—	—	—	—	—	4	3	1	0	240	16	0	4.00
1921–22	Brandon Elks	MHL	12	9	3	0	720	55	0	4.58	2	2	0	0	120	5	0	2.50
1922–23	Brandon Elks	MHL	16	9	7	0	960	57	0	3.56	—	—	—	—	—	—	—	—
1923–24	Brandon Elks	MHL	12	9	3	0	720	36	1	3.00	4	1	2	1	240	7	1	1.75
1924–25	Edmonton Eskimos	WCHL	17	7	9	1	1060	68	1	3.85	—	—	—	—	—	—	—	—
1925–26	Edmonton Eskimos	WHL	30	19	11	0	1800	77	2	2.57	2	0	1	1	120	5	0	2.50
1926–27	Detroit Cougars	NHL	3	1	2	0	180	5	0	1.67	—	—	—	—	—	—	—	—
1927–28	Detroit Olympics	Can-Pro	41	24	13	4	2540	73	2	1.72	2	1	1	0	120	4	0	2.00
1928–29	Detroit Olympics	Can-Pro	42	27	10	5	2750	67	11	1.56	7	4	3	0	420	14	2	1.83
1929–30	Detroit Olympics	IHL	42	—	—	—	2520	74	7	1.76	3	—	—	—	180	7	0	2.33
1930–31	London Tecumsehs	IHL	48	21	21	6	3010	83	12	1.65	—	—	—	—	—	—	—	—
1931–32	London Tecumsehs	IHL	48	21	15	12	2880	70	13	1ю46	6	1	2	3	360	10	3	1.67
1932–33	London Tecumsehs	IHL	44	27	9	8	2640	66	12	1.46	6	2	3	1	360	11	1	1.83
1933–34	Syracuse Stars	IHL	2	—	—	—	120	4	0	2.00	—	—	—	—	—	—	—	—
1933–34	London Tecumsehs	IHL	44	18	17	9	2640	80	6	1.81	6	5	1	0	360	9	1	1.50
1934–35	London Tecumsehs	IHL	36	17	14	5	2230	90	4	2.42	—	—	—	—	—	—	—	—
1935–36	London Tecumsehs	IHL	48	23	22	3	2950	125	3	2.54	2	0	1	1	130	4	0	1.85
WCHL/WHL totals			47	26	20	1	2860	145	3	3.04	2	0	1	1	120	5	0	2.50
NHL totals			3	1	2	0	180	5	0	1.67	—	—	—	—	—	—	—	—
