= Hal Hicks =

Canadian ice hockey player

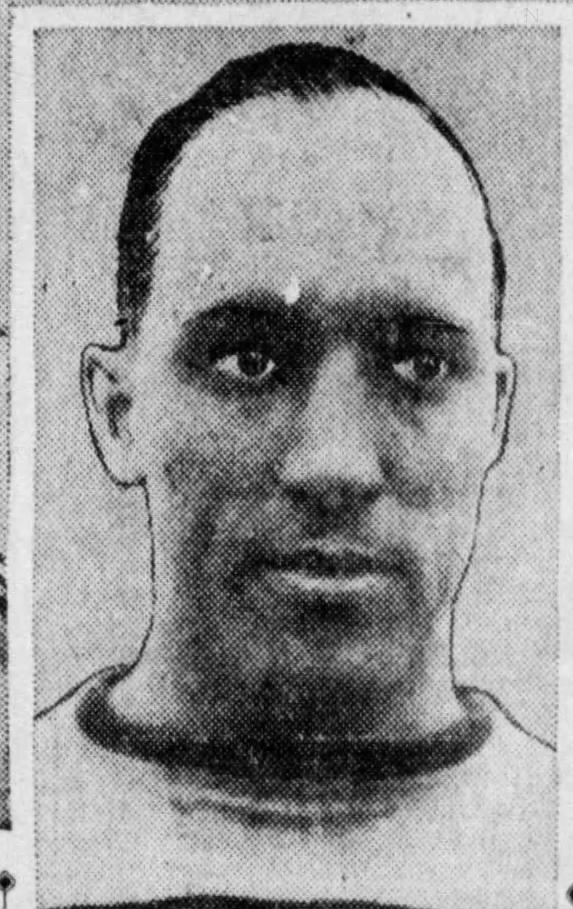
- Hicks in 1929
- Born: December 10, 1900 Sillery, Quebec, Canada
- Died: August 14, 1965 (aged 64)
- Height: 5 ft 7 in (170 cm)
- Weight: 170 lb (77 kg; 12 st 2 lb)
- Position: Right wing
- Shot: Left
- Played for: Detroit Falcons; Detroit Cougars; Montreal Maroons
- Playing career: 1917–1934

Harold Henry Hicks (December 10, 1900 — August 14, 1965) was a Canadian professional ice hockey player who played 90 games in the National Hockey League with the Montreal Maroons, Detroit Cougars, and Detroit Falcons between 1928 and 1931. The rest of his career, which lasted between 1917 and 1934, was spent in various minor leagues. He was born in Sillery, Quebec.

== Career statistics ==
=== Regular season and playoffs ===
			Regular season					Playoffs
Season	Team	League	GP	G	A	Pts	PIM	GP	G	A	Pts	PIM
1916–17	Ottawa Collegiate	OCJHL	—	—	—	—	—	—	—	—	—	—
1917–18	Ottawa Mallettes	OCHL	1	0	0	0	0	—	—	—	—	—
1917–18	Ottawa Collegiate	OCJHL	1	0	0	0	0	—	—	—	—	—
1918–19	Ottawa Grand Trunk	OCHL	—	—	—	—	—	—	—	—	—	—
1919–20	Ottawa Grand Trunk	OCHL	—	—	—	—	—	—	—	—	—	—
1920–21	Ottawa City Hall	OCHL	12	0	0	0	—	—	—	—	—	—
1921–22	Ottawa St. Brigid	OCHL	6	0	0	0	6	—	—	—	—	—
1922–23	Ottawa Acc	OHA Int	—	—	—	—	—	—	—	—	—	—
1923–24	Ottawa Acc	OHA Int	—	—	—	—	—	—	—	—	—	—
1924–25	Ottawa Rideaus	OCHL	12	2	0	2	—	3	0	0	0	—
1925–26	Montreal CNR	MRTHL	7	3	1	4	10	1	0	0	0	0
1925–26	Ottawa Rideaus	OCHL	6	4	3	7	—	—	—	—	—	—
1926–27	Stratford Nationals	Can-Pro	31	5	4	9	76	2	0	0	0	0
1927–28	Stratford Nationals	Can-Pro	42	8	6	14	61	5	4	1	5	8
1928–29	Montreal Maroons	NHL	44	2	0	2	27	—	—	—	—	—
1929–30	Detroit Cougars	NHL	30	3	2	5	34	—	—	—	—	—
1929–30	Detroit Olympics	IHL	15	0	1	1	21	3	0	0	0	0
1930–31	Detroit Falcons	NHL	16	0	0	0	10	—	—	—	—	—
1930–31	London Tecumsehs	IHL	27	4	3	7	10	—	—	—	—	—
1931–32	London Techumsehs	IHL	47	3	9	12	53	6	0	1	1	2
1932–33	London Techumsehs	IHL	44	9	15	24	51	6	0	0	0	5
1933–34	London Techumsehs	IHL	15	1	1	2	8	—	—	—	—	—
IHL totals			148	17	29	46	143	15	0	1	1	7
NHL totals			90	5	2	7	71	—	—	—	—	—
