= Cliff McBride =

Canadian ice hockey player

- Born: January 1, 1909; Toronto, Ontario, Canada
- Died: February 17, 1999 (aged 90); Pompano Beach, Florida, USA
- Height: 5 ft 9 in (175 cm)
- Weight: 180 lb (82 kg; 12 st 12 lb)
- Position: Defenceman
- Shot: Right
- Played for: Toronto Maple Leafs
- Playing career: 1927–1938

Joseph Clifford McBride (January 1, 1909 — February 17, 1999) was a Canadian professional ice hockey player who played one game in the National Hockey League, with the Toronto Maple Leafs on December 25, 1929 against the Boston Bruins. Earlier references have him also playing one game for the Montreal Maroons, but that is not correct. The rest of his career, which lasted from 1927 to 1938, was spent in various minor leagues. He was born in Toronto, Ontario.

== Career statistics ==
=== Regular season and playoffs ===
| | | | Regular season | | | | | Playoffs |
| Season | Team | League | GP | G | A | Pts | PIM | GP | G | A | Pts | PIM |
|---|---|---|---|---|---|---|---|---|---|---|---|---|
| 1926–27 | Iroquois Falls Eskimos | NOJHA | — | — | — | — | — | — | — | — | — | — |
| 1926–27 | Iroquois Falls Eskimos | M-Cup | — | — | — | — | — | 6 | 15 | 3 | 18 | 8 |
| 1927–28 | Fort William Forts | TBSHL | 20 | 12 | 5 | 17 | 81 | 2 | 0 | 0 | 0 | 2 |
| 1928–29 | Windsor Bulldogs | Can-Pro | 20 | 3 | 1 | 4 | 29 | — | — | — | — | — |
| 1929–30 | Toronto Maple Leafs | NHL | 1 | 0 | 0 | 0 | 0 | — | — | — | — | — |
| 1929–30 | London Panthers | IHL | 12 | 1 | 0 | 1 | 29 | — | — | — | — | — |
| 1929–30 | Toronto Millionaires | IHL | 25 | 2 | 7 | 9 | 5 | — | — | — | — | — |
| 1929–30 | Galt Terriers | Can-Pro | 1 | 0 | 0 | 0 | 0 | — | — | — | — | — |
| 1929–30 | Brantford Indians | Can-Pro | 8 | 0 | 1 | 1 | 2 | — | — | — | — | — |
| 1930–31 | Pittsburgh Yellowjackets | IHL | 4 | 0 | 0 | 0 | 8 | — | — | — | — | — |
| 1930–31 | Cleveland Indians | IHL | 38 | 2 | 3 | 5 | 34 | 6 | 0 | 1 | 1 | 0 |
| 1931–32 | Syracuse Stars | IHL | 46 | 4 | 5 | 9 | 54 | — | — | — | — | — |
| 1933–34 | New Haven Eagles | Can-Am | 39 | 7 | 8 | 15 | 51 | — | — | — | — | — |
| 1934–35 | New Haven Eagles | Can-Am | 44 | 13 | 11 | 24 | 32 | — | — | — | — | — |
| 1935–36 | Springfield Indians | Can-Am | 42 | 6 | 9 | 15 | 33 | 3 | 0 | 0 | 0 | 8 |
| 1936–37 | Springfield Indians | IAHL | 45 | 1 | 9 | 10 | 77 | 5 | 1 | 0 | 1 | 4 |
| 1937–38 | Springfield Indians | IAHL | 43 | 5 | 5 | 10 | 2 | — | — | — | — | — |
| Can-Am totals | | | 125 | 26 | 28 | 54 | 116 | 3 | 0 | 0 | 0 | 8 |
| IHL totals | | | 125 | 9 | 15 | 24 | 130 | 6 | 0 | 1 | 1 | 0 |
| NHL totals | | | 1 | 0 | 0 | 0 | 0 | — | — | — | — | — |
