= Doug Young (ice hockey) =

Canadian ice hockey player

- Born: October 1, 1908; Medicine Hat, Alberta, Canada
- Died: May 15, 1990 (aged 81); Cardston, Alberta, Canada
- Height: 5 ft 10 in (178 cm)
- Weight: 190 lb (86 kg; 13 st 8 lb)
- Position: Defence
- Shot: Right
- Played for: Detroit Red Wings; Montreal Canadiens
- Playing career: 1927–1941

Douglas Gordon Young (October 1, 1908 – May 15, 1990) was a Canadian ice hockey defenceman who played mostly for the Detroit Red Wings of the National Hockey League. Young was also captain of the Red Wings from 1935 to 1938 leading the team to two Stanley Cup wins. The original (cup) bands are currently on display at the Hockey Hall of Fame.

== Playing career ==
=== Junior hockey ===
Young had a great start to his hockey career when he was part of the 1926 Memorial Cup champion Calgary Canadians. He followed this feat by joining the Canadian Professional Hockey League as a member of the Kitchener Millionaires (later renamed the Toronto Millionaires) and playing sound defensive hockey. The IHL took notice and Young transferred to the Cleveland Indians to start the 1929 season. For two more seasons he continued to display his defensive talent until finally the NHL took notice.

=== Professional hockey ===
Within a two-month span in 1931, Young was claimed by the Philadelphia Quakers in an Inter-league draft, claimed by the New York Americans in the Dispersal Draft, and traded to the Detroit Falcons for Ron Martin. So finally, on October 18, 1931, Young had found his NHL home with the Detroit Falcons. In the 1931–32 season Young made his NHL debut and posted a career-high ten goals in his rookie campaign. He would continue to knock in a few goals and play sound defensive hockey for Detroit (now renamed the Detroit Red Wings) and in the 1935–36 season, he helped them win the Stanley Cup. Young missed most of the 1937 season with an injury, but his name was still engraved on the Stanley Cup. He was Captain of the Red Wings from 1935–38. He was selected to appear in his first All-Star Game in 1939.

Prior to 1940, Young was signed as a free agent by the Montreal Canadiens, where he would play his last 50 games in the NHL. Young was claimed on waivers by the Toronto Maple Leafs in 1940 and was set down to their farm team, the Providence Reds of the American Hockey League. Young finished out his career scoring 22 points for the Reds in the 1940–41 season.

=== Retirement ===
After his retirement in 1941 Doug Young went on to pursue a career as an On-Ice Official for the NHL and to work for the Detroit Red Wings home office.

== Awards and achievements ==
- IHL First All-Star Team (1930)
- Won two Stanley Cups with the Detroit Red Wings (1936 & 1937)
- Selected to NHL All Star Game (1939)
- AHL First All-Star Team (1941)

== Career statistics ==
=== Regular season and playoffs ===
			Regular season					Playoffs
Season	Team	League	GP	G	A	Pts	PIM	GP	G	A	Pts	PIM
1926–27	Calgary Canadians	CCJHL	—	—	—	—	—	—	—	—	—	—
1926–27	Calgary Canadians	M-Cup	—	—	—	—	—	2	0	1	1	2
1927–28	Kitchener Millionaires	Can-Pro	8	1	1	2	10	5	0	1	1	12
1928–29	Toronto Millionaires	Can-Pro	41	7	3	10	75	2	0	0	0	8
1929–30	Cleveland Indians	IHL	41	13	5	18	68	6	2	0	2	2
1930–31	Cleveland Indians	IHL	47	16	6	22	46	6	3	1	4	8
1931–32	Detroit Falcons	NHL	47	10	2	12	45	2	0	0	2
1932–33	Detroit Red Wings	NHL	48	5	6	11	59	4	1	1	2	0
1933–34	Detroit Red Wings	NHL	47	4	0	4	36	9	0	0	0	10
1934–35	Detroit Red Wings	NHL	48	4	6	10	37	—	—	—	—	—
1934–35	Detroit Olympics	IHL	1	0	0	0	0	—	—	—	—	—
1935–36	Detroit Red Wings	NHL	47	5	12	17	54	7	0	2	2	0
1936–37	Detroit Red Wings	NHL	11	0	0	0	6	—	—	—	—	—
1937–38	Detroit Red Wings	NHL	48	3	5	8	24	—	—	—	—	—
1938–39	Detroit Red Wings	NHL	42	1	5	6	16	6	0	2	2	4
1939–40	Montreal Canadiens	NHL	47	3	9	12	22	—	—	—	—	—
1940–41	Montreal Canadiens	NHL	3	0	0	0	4	—	—	—	—	—
1940–41	Providence Reds	AHL	42	9	13	22	22	4	0	1	1	7
NHL totals			388	35	45	80	303	28	1	5	6	16

Preceded by Ebbie Goodfellow	Detroit Red Wings captain 1935-38	Succeeded by Ebbie Goodfellow
