= Robert Boucher (ice hockey) =

Canadian ice hockey player

- Born: February 14, 1904 Ottawa, Ontario, Canada
- Died: June 10, 1931 (aged 27)
- Height: 5 ft 8 in (173 cm)
- Weight: 142 lb (64 kg; 10 st 2 lb)
- Position: Centre
- Shot: Right
- Played for: Montreal Canadiens
- Playing career: 1919–1929

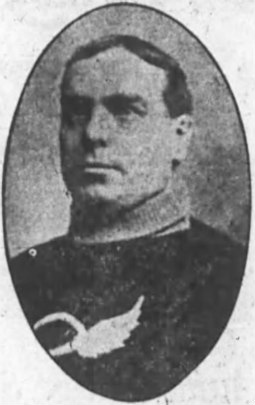
Bobby's father Tom Boucher while a rugby football player at Ottawa College in the 1890s.

Robert James "Bobby" Boucher (February 14, 1904 – June 10, 1931) was a Canadian professional ice hockey centre who played 11 games in the National Hockey League (NHL) for the Montreal Canadiens during the 1923–24 season. The rest of his career, which lasted from 1919 to 1929, was spent in the minor leagues. He won the Stanley Cup in 1924 with Montreal. He was one of four brothers who played in the NHL.

== Personal life ==
Bobby was one of six sons born to Tom Boucher and Annie Carroll. His paternal grandfather, Antoine Boucher was French while his other grandparents were of Irish descent. His brothers Billy, Frank and Georges would also become professional ice hockey players. There were two other brothers, Carroll and Joseph, and two sisters, Irene and Lily. Their father played rugby football, winning the Canadian championship in 1894, 1896, 1897 and 1901.

Bobby had a daughter with his wife Kay Wilson. Kay was a successful speed skater, who won civic titles in Hamilton and Ottawa. Bobby died at 27 years of age on June 10, 1931, of tuberculosis. Bobby's funeral was held at his brother Carrol's in Ottawa followed by a service at St-Theresa's church which was attended by many members of the sporting circle of the Nations's Capital including all of his famous hockey-playing siblings. He was later interred at Notre Dame cemetery alongside his parents.

== Playing career ==
Boucher played junior hockey with the Ottawa New Edinburghs, Ottawa Muchmore and Creighton Public School. During this time he was no stranger to professional hockey, as he was also a mascot for the Ottawa Senators until 1921. Although no details of what that entailed are available, he was likely a stick-boy. He then spent the next three seasons with the Iroquois Falls "Baby" Eskimos before returning to Ottawa to play for the Ottawa Gunners for a portion of the 1923-24 season.

On January 24, 1924, Bobby was signed as a free agent by the Montreal Canadiens. He played 12 regular season games alongside his brother Billy, as well as three of the four Stanley Cup playoff games. Despite having shared in the success in Montreal, he was traded to the Vancouver Maroons of the WCHL on the very day the Canadiens were celebrating their Stanley Cup win. Team owner Leo Dandurand felt Bobby was "too small", and traded him for Charlie Cotch. This may well have been one of the shortest stints in the NHL on a Stanley Cup-winning team for a player.

He then bounced between 5 teams in the next 4 seasons in the WHL, Can-Pro and the Can-Amhockey leagues, and had his best season with the London Panthers in 1926-27, marking 8 goals and 2 assists and a career-high 39 penalty minutes. His last season was with Sprague Cleghorn's Newark Bulldogs, with which he played only 5 games, presumably because his tuberculosis began to hinder his performance.

After Boucher retired from hockey, he became a referee in the Ottawa Valley Hockey League.

== Career statistics ==
=== Regular season and playoffs ===
			Regular season					Playoffs
Season	Team	League	GP	G	A	Pts	PIM	GP	G	A	Pts	PIM
1916–17	Ottawa New Edinburghs	OCJHL	9	1	0	1	—	2	0	0	0	—
1917–18	Ottawa Mutchmore	Midg	—	—	—	—	—	—	—	—	—	—
1917–18	Ottawa New Edinburghs	OCJHL	1	0	0	0	0	—	—	—	—	—
1918–19	Ottawa Crighton	Midg	—	—	—	—	—	—	—	—	—	—
1919–20	Ottawa New Edinburghs	OCHL	4	0	0	0	0	—	—	—	—	—
1920–21	Ottawa New Edinburghs	OCHL	1	1	0	1	—	—	—	—	—	—
1920–21	Iroquois Falls Papermakers	NOHA	—	—	—	—	—	—	—	—	—	—
1921–22	Ottawa New Edinburghs	OCHL	1	0	0	0	0	—	—	—	—	—
1922–23	Iroquois Falls Papermakes	NOHA	—	—	—	—	—	—	—	—	—	—
1923–24	Montreal Canadiens	NHL	11	1	0	1	0	2	0	0	0	0
1923–24	Ottawa Gunners	OCSHL	7	4	1	5	—	—	—	—	—	—
1923–24	Montreal Canadiens	St-Cup	—	—	—	—	—	3	0	0	0	0
1924–25	Vancouver Maroons	WCHL	19	1	0	1	3	—	—	—	—	—
1925–26	Edmonton Eskimos	WHL	29	2	1	3	16	—	—	—	—	—
1926–27	London Panthers	Can-Pro	32	8	2	10	39	4	0	0	0	2
1927–28	Toronto Falcons	Can-Pro	1	0	0	0	2	—	—	—	—	—
1927–28	Quebec Castors	Can-Am	23	3	0	3	18	6	0	1	1	10
1928–29	Newark Bulldogs	Can-Am	5	0	0	0	2	—	—	—	—	—
NHL totals			11	1	0	1	0	2	0	0	0	0
