= Hobie Kitchen =

Canadian ice hockey player

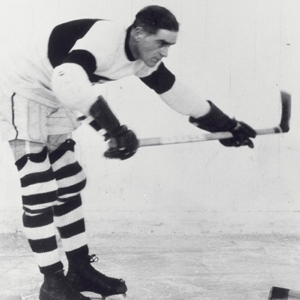
- Born: February 8, 1903; Newmarket, Ontario, Canada
- Height: 5 ft 11 in (180 cm)
- Weight: 187 lb (85 kg; 13 st 5 lb)
- Position: Defence
- Shot: Left
- Played for: Montreal Maroons; Detroit Cougars
- Playing career: 1925–1929

Chapman Hobart Kitchen (February 8, 1903 — Unknown) was a Canadian ice hockey player who played 47 games in the National Hockey League with the Montreal Maroons and Detroit Cougars between 1925 and 1927. He also played parts of three seasons in the minor Canadian Professional Hockey League and Canadian–American Hockey League, retiring in 1929.

== Career statistics ==
=== Regular season and playoffs ===
			Regular season					Playoffs
Season	Team	League	GP	G	A	Pts	PIM	GP	G	A	Pts	PIM
1920–21	Toronto Moose	OHA Jr	—	—	—	—	—	—	—	—	—	—
1921–22	Toronto Aura Lee	OHA Jr	2	0	0	0	0	—	—	—	—	—
1922–23	Toronto Aura Lee	OHA Jr	2	0	0	0	0	—	—	—	—	—
1923–24	Toronto St. Mary's	OHA Jr	8	5	0	5	15	—	—	—	—	—
1924–25	Niagara Falls Cataracts	OHA Sr	20	21	2	23	25	2	1	0	1	2
1924–25	Niagara Falls Cataracts	Allan Cup	—	—	—	—	—	8	4	2	6	—
1925–26	Montreal Maroons	NHL	30	5	2	7	16	—	—	—	—	—
1926–27	Detroit Cougars	NHL	17	0	2	2	42	—	—	—	—	—
1926–27	New Haven Eagles	Can-Am	6	0	0	0	10	—	—	—	—	—
1927–28	Kitchener Millionaires	Can-Pro	9	0	0	0	40	—	—	—	—	—
1928–29	Niagara Falls Cataracts	Can-Pro	6	0	0	0	10	—	—	—	—	—
NHL totals			47	5	4	9	58	—	—	—	—	—
