= List of Pittsburgh Yellow Jackets players =

This is a complete list of players who have played for the Pittsburgh Yellow Jackets ice hockey team in the United States Amateur Hockey Association, in the IHL, or in the Eastern Amateur Hockey League of 1933 to 1953.

== A ==
Ty Arbour, Clyde Adams

== B ==
Cliff Barton, Pete Bessone, Edmond Bouchard, Frank Brimsek, Len Burrage

== C ==
Lionel Conacher, Harold Cotton, Abbie Cox

== D ==
Harold Darragh, Gordie Drillon, Herbert Drury

== F ==
Gord Fraser

== G ==
Gus Giesebrecht, Lloyd Grant

== H ==
Milt Halliday, Bill Holmes

== I ==
Frank Ingram

== L ==
Norm Locking, Fred Lowrey

== M ==
Dinny Manners, Joe Matte, Cliff McBride, Duke McCurry, Butch McDonald, Mickey McGuire, Alex McKinnon, Hib Milks, Earl Miller, Alex 'Monty' Muckle

== O ==
Eddie Ouellette

== R ==
Leo Reise, Eddie Rodden, Doc Romnes

== S ==
Pat Shea, Rodger Smith, Paddy Sullivan

== W ==
Tex White, Roy Worters
