= Vic Hoffinger =

Russian-born Canadian ice hockey player

- Born: January 1, 1901 Selz, Russian Empire
- Died: March 22, 1976 (aged 75)
- Height: 5 ft 6 in (168 cm)
- Weight: 2,190 lb (993 kg; 156 st 6 lb)
- Position: Defence
- Shot: Left
- Played for: Chicago Black Hawks
- Playing career: 1925–1935

Valentin Edward "Vic" Hoffinger (January 1, 1901 – March 22, 1976) was a Russian-born Canadian professional ice hockey player who played 28 games in the National Hockey League with the Chicago Black Hawks during the 1927–28 and 1928–29 seasons. The rest of his career, which lasted from 1925 to 1935, was spent in various minor leagues. Hoffinger was born in Selz, Russian Empire, and raised in Saskatoon, Saskatchewan. After his playing career he became a coach in Germany, and led the German national team at the 1936 Winter Olympics. He married Bernice Scholl. Hoffinger became a podiatrist after his hockey career.

== Career statistics ==
=== Regular season and playoffs ===
			Regular season					Playoffs
Season	Team	League	GP	G	A	Pts	PIM	GP	G	A	Pts	PIM
1925–26	Saskatoon Empires	NSSHL	4	6	1	7	6	2	1	0	1	0
1926–27	Saskatoon Sheiks	PHL	29	13	6	19	42	4	0	0	0	8
1927–28	Chicago Black Hawks	NHL	18	0	1	1	18	—	—	—	—	—
1927–28	Saskatoon Sheiks	PHL	16	5	1	6	14	—	—	—	—	—
1928–29	Chicago Black Hawks	NHL	10	0	0	0	10	—	—	—	—	—
1928–29	Duluth Hornets	AHA	6	0	1	1	4	—	—	—	—	—
1928–29	Kitchener Flying Dutchmen	Can-Pro	4	0	0	0	0	—	—	—	—	—
1928–29	Hamilton Tigers	Can-Pro	21	3	3	6	28	—	—	—	—	—
1929–30	Hamilton Tigers	IHL	42	4	3	7	74	—	—	—	—	—
1930–31	Syracuse Stars	IHL	8	0	0	0	21	—	—	—	—	—
1930–31	Detroit Olympics	IHL	39	4	6	10	68	—	—	—	—	—
1931–32	London Tecumsehs	IHL	44	4	3	7	16	6	1	1	2	2
1932–33	London Tecumsehs	IHL	33	6	6	12	18	—	—	—	—	—
1933–34	Edmonton Eskimos	NWHL	5	0	0	0	0	—	—	—	—	—
1934–35	Oklahoma City Warriors	AHA	46	4	4	8	46	—	—	—	—	—
IHL totals			166	18	18	36	197	6	1	1	2	2
NHL totals			28	0	1	1	28	—	—	—	—	—
