= Billy Cameron =

Canadian ice hockey player (1922–2013)

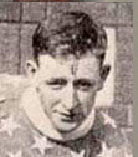
- Born: December 5, 1896
- Died: January 28, 1972 (aged 75) Ottawa, Ontario, Canada
- Position: Right Wing
- Shot: Left
- Played for: Montreal Canadiens; New York Americans
- Playing career: 1924–1929

William Alexander Cameron (December 5, 1896 – January 28, 1972) was a Canadian professional ice hockey right winger who played two seasons in the National Hockey League for the Montreal Canadiens and New York Americans between 1923 and 1925. Cameron won the Stanley Cup in 1924 with the Canadiens.

== Career statistics ==
=== Regular season and playoffs ===
			Regular season					Playoffs
Season	Team	League	GP	G	A	Pts	PIM	GP	G	A	Pts	PIM
1914–15	Buckingham A.C.C.	LOVHL	7	3	0	3	—	5	5	0	5	—
1915–16	Buckingham A.C.C.	LOVHL	—	—	—	—	—	3	1	0	1	—
1916–17	Pittsburgh A.A.	Exhib	40	12	0	12	—	—	—	—	—	—
1920–21	Quebec Royal Rifles	QCHL	7	5	0	5	—	4	1	0	1	—
1922–23	Porcupine Gold Miners	GBHL	—	—	—	—	—	1	1	0	1	—
1923–24	Montreal Canadiens	NHL	18	0	1	1	4	2	0	0	0	0
1923–24	Montreal Canadiens	St-Cup	—	—	—	—	—	4	0	0	0	0
1925–26	New York Americans	NHL	21	0	0	0	0	—	—	—	—	—
1926–27	St. Paul Saints	AHA	31	3	1	4	22	—	—	—	—	—
1927–28	Kitchener Millionaires	Can Pro	25	1	0	1	34	4	0	0	0	18
1928–29	Toronto Millionaires	Can Pro	32	3	1	4	39	2	0	0	0	2
1929–30	Hamilton Tigers	IHL	1	0	0	0	0	—	—	—	—	—
1929–30	Buffalo Bisons	IHL	1	0	0	0	0	—	—	—	—	—
NHL totals			39	0	1	1	4	2	0	0	0	0
