= Al Murray (ice hockey) =

Canadian ice hockey player (1906–1982)

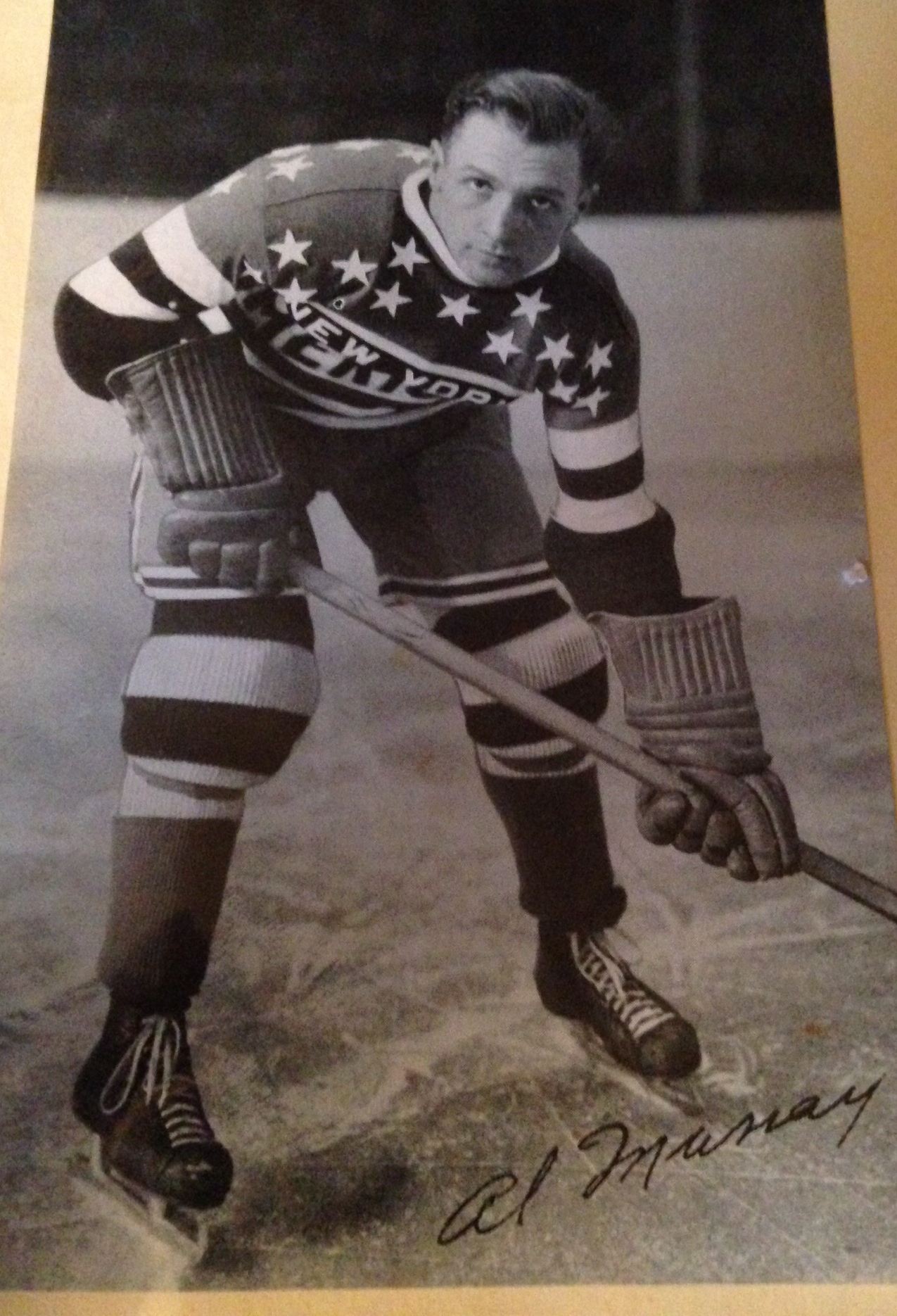
- Al Murray New York Americans Defenceman
- Born: November 10, 1906 Stratford, Ontario, Canada
- Died: January 7, 1982 (aged 75) Stratford, Ontario, Canada
- Height: 5 ft 8 in (173 cm)
- Weight: 158 lb (72 kg; 11 st 4 lb)
- Position: Defence
- Shot: Right
- Played for: New York Americans
- Playing career: 1928–1940

Allan Haines Murray (November 10, 1906 – January 7, 1982) was a Canadian professional ice hockey player who played 277 games in the National Hockey League (NHL) with the New York Americans between 1933 and 1940. He was born in Stratford, Ontario.

In retirement, Murray owned the Albion Hotel in Galt, Ontario, and coached junior ice hockey teams, including the Guelph Biltmores in the 1941–42 season, the Brantford Lions in the 1942–43 season, and the Galt Canadians in the 1943–44 season.

== Career statistics ==
=== Regular season and playoffs ===
			Regular season					Playoffs
Season	Team	League	GP	G	A	Pts	PIM	GP	G	A	Pts	PIM
1926–27	Stratford Midgets	OHA	—	—	—	—	—	—	—	—	—	—
1927–28	South Porcupine Porkies	NOHA	—	—	—	—	—	—	—	—	—	—
1928–29	Buffalo Bisons	Can-Pro	28	2	1	3	27	—	—	—	—	—
1929–30	Buffalo Bisons	IHL	37	1	0	1	54	—	—	—	—	—
1930–31	Buffalo Bisons	IHL	46	0	3	3	42	4	0	0	0	2
1931–32	Buffalo Bisons	IHL	46	2	7	9	39	6	0	0	0	2
1932–33	Buffalo Bisons	IHL	43	1	7	8	48	6	0	0	0	4
1933–34	New York Americans	NHL	39	1	1	2	20	—	—	—	—	—
1933–34	Syracuse Stars	IHL	9	1	0	1	28	—	—	—	—	—
1934–35	New York Americans	NHL	43	1	2	3	36	—	—	—	—	—
1935–36	New York Americans	NHL	48	1	0	1	33	5	0	0	0	2
1936–37	New York Americans	NHL	40	0	2	2	22	—	—	—	—	—
1937–38	New York Americans	NHL	47	0	1	1	34	6	0	0	0	6
1938–39	New York Americans	NHL	18	0	0	0	8	—	—	—	—	—
1939–40	New York Americans	NHL	36	1	4	5	10	3	0	0	0	2
NHL totals			271	5	9	14	163	14	0	0	0	10
