= Milt Halliday =

Canadian ice hockey player (1906–1989)

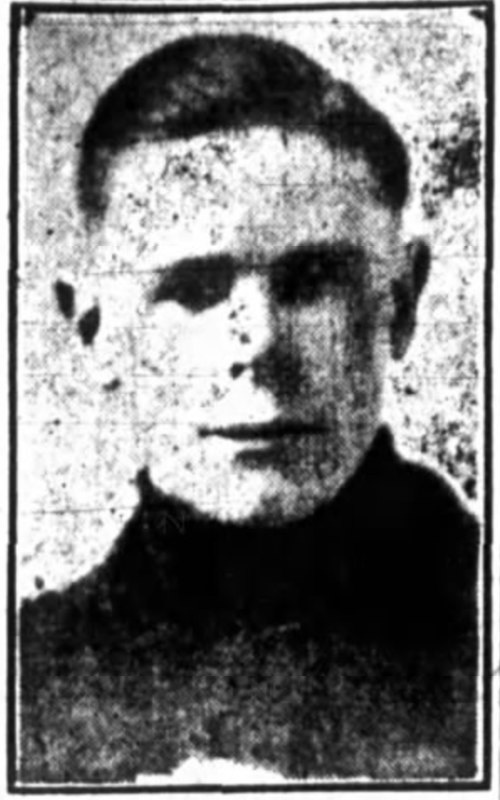
- Halliday in 1922
- Born: September 21, 1906 Ottawa, Ontario, Canada
- Died: August 16, 1989 (aged 82)
- Height: 5 ft 10 in (178 cm)
- Weight: 180 lb (82 kg; 12 st 12 lb)
- Position: Left wing
- Shot: Left
- Played for: Ottawa Senators
- Playing career: 1924–1939

Samuel Milton Halliday (September 21, 1906 – August 16, 1989) was a Canadian professional ice hockey player. He played in the National Hockey League (NHL) for the Ottawa Senators from 1926 until 1929, and was a member of the Stanley Cup-winning team of 1927. The rest of his career, which lasted from 1924 to 1939, was spent in various minor leagues.

== Playing career ==
Born in Ottawa, Ontario, Halliday made the jump to NHL hockey from the amateur ranks of the Ottawa Gunners of the Ottawa City Hockey League, joining the hometown Ottawa Senators for the 1926–27 season. Halliday would play on a line with Hec Kilrea and Jack Duggan. That season, the Senators would defeat the Boston Bruins in the Stanley Cup championship, in the first final series between two NHL teams.

In the following two seasons, Halliday would split his time between the Senators and minor pro teams in London, Ontario and Niagara Falls, Ontario of the Canadian Pro minor league. After the 1928–29 season, Halliday would not play in the NHL again, traded by Ottawa to Hamilton, Ontario of the International League. He would play the rest of his career for various minor professional teams of the International League and the Can-Am leagues. He left professional hockey in 1936 to return to Ottawa, where he played two seasons as a reinstated amateur player for the Ottawa Montagnards of the Ottawa City League before retiring from competitive hockey.

== Career statistics ==
=== Regular season and playoffs ===
			Regular season					Playoffs
Season	Team	League	GP	G	A	Pts	PIM	GP	G	A	Pts	PIM
1924–25	Ottawa Gunners	OCHL	16	7	1	8	—	—	—	—	—	—
1925–26	Ottawa Gunners	OCHL	—	10	2	12	—	6	3	0	3	—
1926–27	Ottawa Senators	NHL	38	1	0	1	2	6	0	0	0	0
1927–28	Ottawa Senators	NHL	13	0	0	0	2	—	—	—	—	—
1927–28	London Panthers	Can-Pro	29	8	1	9	6	—	—	—	—	—
1928–29	Ottawa Senators	NHL	16	0	0	0	0	—	—	—	—	—
1928–29	Niagara Falls Cataracts	Can-Pro	25	4	1	5	10	—	—	—	—	—
1929–30	Hamilton Tigers	IHL	41	12	3	15	10	—	—	—	—	—
1930–31	Pittsburgh Yellow Jackets	IHL	44	11	2	13	14	6	0	0	0	2
1931–32	Pittsburgh Yellow Jackets	IHL	16	1	2	3	8	—	—	—	—	—
1931–32	Cleveland Indians	IHL	29	14	2	16	6	—	—	—	—	—
1932–33	Cleveland Indians	IHL	42	14	8	22	10	—	—	—	—	—
1933–34	Boston Tiger-Cubs	Can-Am	39	9	9	18	8	5	2	1	3	0
1934–35	Boston Tiger-Cubs	Can-Am	13	2	4	6	2	3	0	0	0	0
1934–35	Cleveland Falcons	IHL	31	12	7	19	10	—	—	—	—	—
1935–36	Cleveland Falcons	IHL	10	1	1	2	2	—	—	—	—	—
1935–36	Buffalo Bisons	IHL	17	1	5	6	0	—	—	—	—	—
1935–36	Rochester Cardinals	IHL	18	3	2	5	4	—	—	—	—	—
1937–38	Ottawa Montagnards	OCHL	18	12	2	14	0	—	—	—	—	—
1938–39	Ottawa Montagnards	OCHL	3	0	0	0	2	—	—	—	—	—
IHL totals			248	69	32	101	64	6	0	0	0	2
NHL totals			67	1	0	1	4	6	0	0	0	0

== Transactions ==
- October 24, 1926 – Signed as a free agent with Ottawa (NHL)
- November 7, 1929 – Traded from Ottawa (NHL) to Hamilton (IHL) for cash
- January 5, 1932 – Traded from Hamilton (IHL) to Cleveland (IHL) for Stew Dunning
- December 18, 1935 – Signed as free agent with Buffalo (IHL)
- February 7, 1936 – Signed as a free agent with Rochester (IHL)
