= Marty Lauder =

Canadian ice hockey player (1907–1959)

- Born: February 26, 1907 Durham, Ontario, Canada
- Died: September 6, 1959 (aged 52)
- Height: 5 ft 6 in (168 cm)
- Weight: 165 lb (75 kg; 11 st 11 lb)
- Position: Defence
- Shot: Left
- Played for: Boston Bruins
- Playing career: 1927–1933

William Thomas Martin Lauder (February 26, 1907 — September 6, 1959) was a Canadian professional ice hockey player who played three games in the National Hockey League for the Boston Bruins during the 1927–28 season. The rest of his career, which lasted from 1927 to 1933, was spent in different minor leagues. He was born in Durham, Ontario. In October 1933 he was sentenced to five years in prison for rape.

== Career statistics ==
=== Regular season and playoffs ===
			Regular season					Playoffs
Season	Team	League	GP	G	A	Pts	PIM	GP	G	A	Pts	PIM
1925–26	Owen Sound Greys	OHA	12	18	6	24	—	8	7	2	9	8
1926–27	Owen Sound Greys	OHA	15	23	13	36	—	—	—	—	—	—
1927–28	Boston Bruins	NHL	3	0	0	0	2	—	—	—	—	—
1927–28	Providence Reds	Can-Am	16	3	1	4	8	—	—	—	—	—
1928–29	Hamilton Tigers	Can-Pro	36	8	5	13	53	—	—	—	—	—
1929–30	Hamilton Tigers	IHL	40	19	11	30	39	—	—	—	—	—
1930–31	Syracuse Stars	IHL	20	6	2	8	26	—	—	—	—	—
1930–31	Buffalo Bisons	IHL	29	8	0	8	18	6	1	0	1	0
1931–32	Buffalo Bisons	IHL	46	7	3	10	24	6	0	0	0	0
1932–33	Buffalo Bisons	IHL	42	4	2	6	24	5	0	0	0	0
IHL totals			177	44	18	62	131	17	1	0	1	0
NHL totals			3	0	0	0	0	—	—	—	—	—
