= Russell Oatman =

Canadian ice hockey player

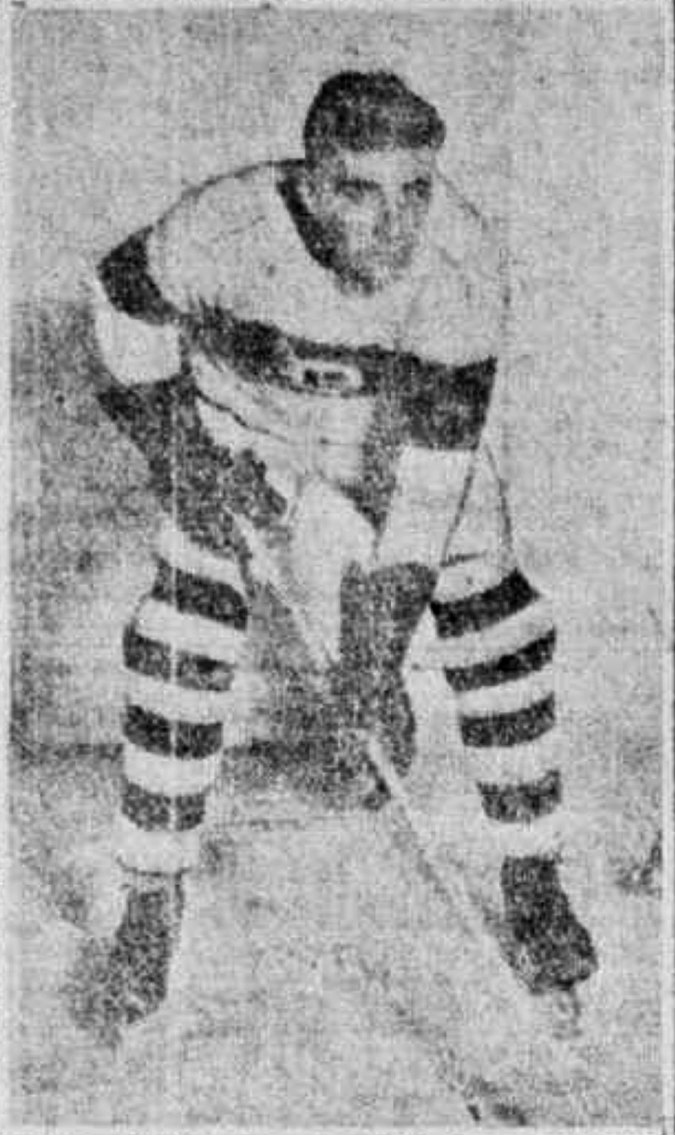
- Oatman with Detroit Cougars
- Born: February 19, 1905 Tillsonburg, Ontario, Canada
- Died: October 25, 1964 (aged 59)
- Height: 5 ft 11 in (180 cm)
- Weight: 195 lb (88 kg; 13 st 13 lb)
- Position: Left wing
- Shot: Left
- Played for: Minneapolis Rockets; Victoria Cougars; Detroit Cougars; Montreal Maroons; New York Rangers
- Playing career: 1920–1930

Warren Russell Oatman (February 19, 1905 – October 25, 1964) was a Canadian ice hockey player. Oatman played 121 games in the National Hockey League with the Detroit Cougars, Montreal Maroons and New York Rangers between 1926 and 1929. His brother Eddie Oatman also played professional ice hockey. He is chiefly remembered as the player who scored at 8:20 of overtime in game two of the 1928 Stanley Cup semi-final against the Montreal Canadiens that put the Montreal Maroons into the Stanley Cup finals against the New York Rangers.

== Playing career ==
Although Oatman was born in Ontario, Oatman is first recorded playing organized hockey in Victoria, British Columbia in 1920. He played one season with the Minneapolis Rockets before joining the Victoria Cougars in 1925. The Cougars, Stanley Cup champions at the time, advanced to the 1926 Stanley Cup Finals against the Montreal Maroons, but were defeated. The Cougars' player rights were sold to the owners of the new Detroit franchise in the National Hockey League (NHL) and Oatman joined the new Detroit Cougars. He was traded to the Montreal Maroons in January 1927. He played for the Maroons until December 1928 when he was traded to the New York Rangers. Oatman's time in the NHL ended when he was traded by the Rangers to the minor-league Hamilton Tigers in October 1929. He was later traded that season by the Tigers to the Niagara Falls Cataracts in January 1930.

The end of Oatman's hockey career came on the night of March 13, 1930. While travelling with Niagara Falls Cataracts team-mate Steve Yankoski for a game, the car went off the road to avoid a head-on collision but crashed into a hydro pole. Oatman suffered a broken left leg, which required surgery and a permanent steel plate. He would work in Toronto for a pharmaceutical company, and coach minor league hockey teams.

== Career statistics ==
=== Regular season and playoffs ===
			Regular season					Playoffs
Season	Team	League	GP	G	A	Pts	PIM	GP	G	A	Pts	PIM
1924–25	Minneapolis Rockets	CHL	27	4	0	4	—	—	—	—	—	—
1925–26	Victoria Cougars	WHL	30	8	4	12	38	4	1	0	1	22
1925–26	Victoria Cougars	St-Cup	—	—	—	—	—	4	0	0	0	10
1926–27	Detroit Cougars	NHL	14	3	0	3	12	—	—	—	—	—
1926–27	Montreal Maroons	NHL	25	8	4	12	30	2	0	0	0	0
1926–27	Windsor Hornets	Can-Pro	1	0	0	0	0	—	—	—	—	—
1927–28	Montreal Maroons	NHL	43	7	4	11	36	9	1	0	1	18
1928–29	Montreal Maroons	NHL	11	1	0	1	12	—	—	—	—	—
1928–29	New York Rangers	NHL	27	1	1	2	10	4	0	0	0	0
1929–30	Hamilton Tigers	IHL	7	2	0	2	8	—	—	—	—	—
1929–30	Niagara Falls Cataracts	IHL	20	6	2	8	2	—	—	—	—	—
WHL totals			30	8	4	12	38	4	1	0	1	22
NHL totals			120	20	9	29	100	15	1	0	1	18
