= George Horne (ice hockey) =

Canadian ice hockey player

- Born: June 27, 1904 Sudbury, Ontario, Canada
- Died: July 31, 1929 (aged 25) Lake Sagatosky, Ontario, Canada
- Height: 5 ft 6 in (168 cm)
- Weight: 165 lb (75 kg; 11 st 11 lb)
- Position: Right wing
- Shot: Right
- Played for: Montreal Maroons; Toronto Maple Leafs
- Playing career: 1925–1929

George Alexander "Shorty" Horne (June 27, 1904 – July 31, 1929) was a Canadian ice hockey right winger who played three seasons in the National Hockey League from 1925 to 1929 for the Montreal Maroons and Toronto Maple Leafs.

In 54 career NHL games, he scored nine goals and assisted on three for twelve points. He won a Stanley Cup with the Maroons in 1926. George's name was left off the Stanley Cup because he did not play in the playoffs. Horne died in the off-season in 1929 when he drowned while on a canoe, prospecting with some friends.

== Career statistics ==
=== Regular season and playoffs ===
			Regular season					Playoffs
Season	Team	League	GP	G	A	Pts	PIM	GP	G	A	Pts	PIM
1920–21	Sudbury Cub-Wolves	NOJHA	4	2	1	3	—	4	2	0	2	—
1921–22	Sudbury Cub-Wolves	NOJHA	4	2	3	5	6	2	1	1	2	2
1921–22	Sudbury Wolves	NOHA	—	—	—	—	—	4	2	3	5	6
1922–23	North Bay Trappers	NOHA	—	—	—	—	—	—	—	—	—	—
1923–24	North Bay Trappers	NOHA	6	6	0	6	—	5	13	0	13	—
1925–26	Montreal Maroons	NHL	13	0	0	0	2	—	—	—	—	—
1926–27	Montreal Maroons	NHL	2	0	0	0	0	—	—	—	—	—
1926–27	Stratford Nationals	Can-Pro	13	2	2	4	20	—	—	—	—	—
1926–27	Niagara Falls Cataracts	Can-Pro	9	4	2	6	4	—	—	—	—	—
1927–28	Stratford Nationals	Can-Pro	40	32	3	35	35	5	3	0	3	13
1928–29	Toronto Maple Leafs	NHL	39	9	3	12	32	4	0	0	0	4
NHL totals			54	9	3	12	34	4	0	0	0	4
Biographical information and career statistics from NHL.com, or Eliteprospects.com, or Hockey-Reference.com, or The Internet Hockey Database

== See also ==
- List of ice hockey players who died during their playing career
