= Roy Burmister =

Canadian left wing ice hockey player

- Born: August 12, 1905; Collingwood, Ontario, Canada
- Died: January 19, 1980 (aged 74); Collingwood, Ontario, Canada
- Height: 5 ft 7 in (170 cm)
- Weight: 155 lb (70 kg; 11 st 1 lb)
- Position: Left wing
- Shot: Left
- Played for: New York Americans
- Playing career: 1925–1939

Roy Samuel Burmister (August 12, 1905 – January 19, 1980) was a Canadian ice hockey left winger known for his speed. He played 67 games in the National Hockey League (NHL) for the New York Americans between 1929 and 1932, scoring four goals and three assists. The rest of his career, which lasted from 1925 to 1939, was spent in various minor leagues. He was born in Collingwood, Ontario.

Although Burmister enjoyed a successful career, he faced difficulty as a junior player. At fifteen, he was fix-foot-six and of slim-build, and struggled to make the particularly strong 1921 junior Collingwood team. Burmister, however, proved himself as a highly competent and went on to become a pro player along with four of his teammates: Bern Brophy, Artie Clark, and Clyde Dey.

He died of a heart attack at his Collingwood home in 1980.

== Career statistics ==
=== Regular season and playoffs ===
			Regular season					Playoffs
Season	Team	League	GP	G	A	Pts	PIM	GP	G	A	Pts	PIM
1924–25	Owen Sound Greys	OHA	—	—	—	—	—	17	8	8	16	—
1924–25	Owen Sound Greys	M-Cup	—	—	—	—	—	8	3	0	3	0
1925–26	Niagara Falls Cataracts	OHA Sr	19	3	5	8	2	—	—	—	—	—
1926–27	Niagara Falls Cataracts	Can Pro	22	6	3	9	4	—	—	—	—	—
1927–28	Niagara Falls Cataracts	Can Pro	39	6	1	7	18	—	—	—	—	—
1928–29	New Haven Eagles	Can-Am	35	1	1	2	8	2	0	0	0	0
1929–30	New York Americans	NHL	40	1	1	2	0	—	—	—	—	—
1929–30	New Haven Eagles	Can-Am	6	1	1	2	0	—	—	—	—	—
1930–31	New York Americans	NHL	11	0	0	0	0	—	—	—	—	—
1930–31	New Haven Eagles	Can-Am	32	12	14	26	18	—	—	—	—	—
1931–32	New York Americans	NHL	16	3	2	5	2	—	—	—	—	—
1931–32	New Haven Eagles	Can-Am	26	9	7	16	16	—	—	—	—	—
1932–33	New Haven Eagles	Can-Am	28	6	0	6	10	—	—	—	—	—
1932–33	Boston Cubs	Can-Am	21	4	3	7	9	7	2	1	3	0
1933–34	Windsor Bulldogs	IHL	40	2	1	3	11	—	—	—	—	—
1934–35	Philadelphia Arrows	Can-Am	48	12	22	34	13	—	—	—	—	—
1935–36	St. Louis Flyers	AHA	48	14	19	33	11	8	1	3	4	0
1936–37	St. Paul Saints	AHA	42	8	19	27	2	3	0	1	1	0
1937–38	St. Paul Saints	AHA	47	6	10	16	4	—	—	—	—	—
1938–39	Kansas City Greyhounds	AHA	47	8	7	15	0	—	—	—	—	—
Can-Am totals			196	45	48	93	114	9	2	1	3	0
NHL totals			67	4	3	7	2	—	—	—	—	—
