= Earl Campbell (ice hockey) =

Canadian ice hockey player

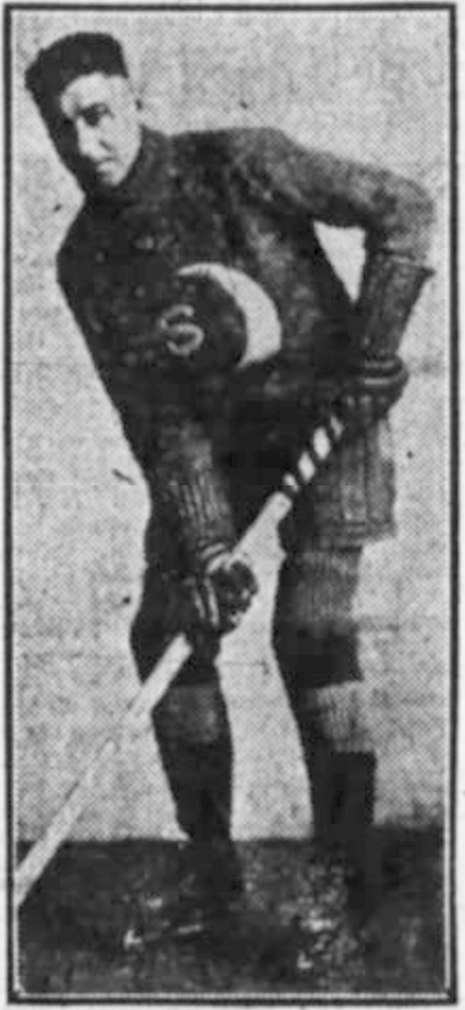
- Born: July 23, 1900 Buckingham, Quebec, Canada
- Died: February 11, 1953 (aged 52)
- Height: 5 ft 11 in (180 cm)
- Weight: 166 lb (75 kg; 11 st 12 lb)
- Position: Defence
- Shot: Left
- Played for: Ottawa Senators; New York Americans
- Playing career: 1921–1929

Robert Earl Campbell (July 23, 1900 – February 11, 1953) was a Canadian professional ice hockey player. Campbell, nicknamed Spiff, played three seasons in the National Hockey League for the Ottawa Senators and New York Americans between 1923 and 1926. Prior to the NHL, he spent three seasons in the Western Canada Hockey League. The rest of his career, which lasted from 1921 to 1929, was spent in various minor leagues.

He was born in Buckingham, Quebec.

== Career statistics ==
=== Regular season and playoffs ===
			Regular season					Playoffs
Season	Team	League	GP	G	A	Pts	PIM	GP	G	A	Pts	PIM
1918–19	Ottawa New Edinburghs	OCHL	3	0	0	0	0	—	—	—	—	—
1918–19	Ottawa Aberdeens	OCHL	5	0	1	1	3	—	—	—	—	—
1919–20	Hull Volants	OCHL	8	0	8	8	—	—	—	—	—	—
1920–21	Hull Volants	OCHL	—	—	—	—	—	—	—	—	—	—
1921–22	Saskatoon/Moose Jaw Crescents	WCHL	20	7	4	11	19	—	—	—	—	—
1922–23	Saskatoon Sheiks	WCHL	10	2	2	4	8	—	—	—	—	—
1922–23	Edmonton Eskmios	WCHL	14	3	2	5	6	2	0	0	0	0
1922–23	Edmonton Eskimos	St-Cup	—	—	—	—	—	2	0	0	0	0
1923–24	Edmonton Eskimos	WCHL	5	0	2	2	4	—	—	—	—	—
1923–24	Ottawa Senators	NHL	18	5	3	8	8	1	0	0	0	6
1924–25	Ottawa Senators	NHL	29	0	0	0	0	—	—	—	—	—
1925–26	New York Americans	NHL	29	1	0	1	6	—	—	—	—	—
1926–27	Hamilton Tigers	Can Pro	26	4	0	4	22	2	1	0	1	0
1927–28	Hamilton Tigers	Can Pro	4	0	0	0	0	—	—	—	—	—
1927–28	Stratford Nationals	Can Pro	12	1	0	1	4	—	—	—	—	—
1928–29	Kitchener Flying Dutchmen	Can Pro	29	4	2	6	37	—	—	—	—	—
WCHL totals			49	12	10	22	37	2	0	0	0	0
NHL totals			76	6	3	9	14	1	0	0	0	6
