= Hamilton Tigers (CPHL) =

Former professional ice hockey team

- City: Hamilton, Ontario
- League: Canadian Professional Hockey League (1926-1929); International Hockey League (1929-1930)
- Operated: 1926–1930
- Home arena: Barton Street Arena
- Colors: Black, gold, white
- Owner: Percy Thompson
- Head coach: Percy Thompson (1926-28); Bernie Morris (1928-1930)

Franchise history
- 1926–1930: Hamilton Tigers (CPHL, IHL)
- 1930–1940: Syracuse Stars (IHL)
- 1940–1970: Buffalo Bisons (AHL)

The Hamilton Tigers were a professional ice hockey team based in Hamilton, Ontario. They competed in the Canadian Professional Hockey League (CPHL) from 1926 to 1929 then in the International Hockey League (IHL) from 1929 to 1930.

== History ==
After the Hamilton Tigers of the National Hockey League (NHL) was disbanded, the Tigers owners decided to revive the name as a minor league professional team in the new CPHL. The team served as a farm club for several teams in the NHL, including the Ottawa Senators and Toronto Maple Leafs and participated in the NHL intra-waiver draft. The team's rosters included several players who played in the NHL, such as Francis Cain, Billy Cameron, Earl Campbell, Milt Halliday, Vic Hoffinger, Marty Lauder, Jack Markle, Bernie Morris, Mike Neville and Russell Oatman. Percy Thompson, who was also part owner and had coached the NHL team, was coach from 1926 to 1928.

The team struggled financially, reportedly losing CA$34,000 over its two first seasons. The fans were described as "being sore on the owners for selling the NHL team". The Abso-Pure Company attempted to sell the team in October 1928 to Buffalo, then Hamilton businessmen. These fell through and the team was nearly closed up when Toronto businessmen expressed their interest in the team. The new owners installed Morris as coach and Hap Watson as general manager. Morris took on the role of manager for the 1929-30 season.

In October 1930, the team was sold to Percy LeSueur and partners and moved to Syracuse, New York to become the Syracuse Stars. The sale included the transfer of both the franchise and the players, but not the contract of manager Bernie Morris. The Stars would eventually be sold and moved to Buffalo, New York to become the Buffalo Bisons of the American Hockey League.

== Record ==
The team had a winning record in its first season and made the league playoffs. The Tigers lost the semi-final to the eventual champion London Panthers in a two-game series. In its second season, the Tigers had a winning record, but finished fifth and missed the playoffs. The team was sold and put under new management. Despite this, the team would have losing records in the next two seasons and miss the playoffs.

| | Regular season | | | | | | | Playoffs | | | | | | |
| Season | GP | W | L | T | GF | GA | P | GP | W | L | T | GF | GA | Result |
CPHL
| 1926-27 | 32 | 16 | 15 | 1 | 80 | 78 | 33 | 2 | 0 | 2 | | 7 | 9 | Finished 2nd in regular season, lost in semi-final |
| 1927-28 | 42 | 19 | 17 | 6 | 100 | 90 | 42 | - | | | | | | Finished 5th, out of playoffs |
| 1928-29 | 42 | 14 | 24 | 4 | 83 | 115 | 32 | - | | | | | | Finished 7th, out of playoffs |
IHL
| 1929-30 | 42 | 9 | 25 | 8 | 95 | 128 | 26 | - | | | | | | Finished 6th, out of playoffs |

Source: Society for International Hockey Research

== Notable players ==
These players all played in the NHL.

- Francis Cain
- Billy Cameron
- Earl Campbell
- Milt Halliday
- Vic Hoffinger
- Marty Lauder
- Jack Markle
- Bernie Morris
- Mike Neville
- Russell Oatman

=== NHL alumni ===
These players graduated to the NHL.

- Gordie Brydson, played with Toronto Maple Leafs in the 1929-30 season
- Jack Markle, played with Toronto Maple Leafs in the 1935-36 season
- George Patterson, played with Maple Leafs, Montreal Canadiens, Boston Bruins, St. Louis Eagles and Detroit Red Wings
