= Eddie Ouellette =

Canadian ice hockey player

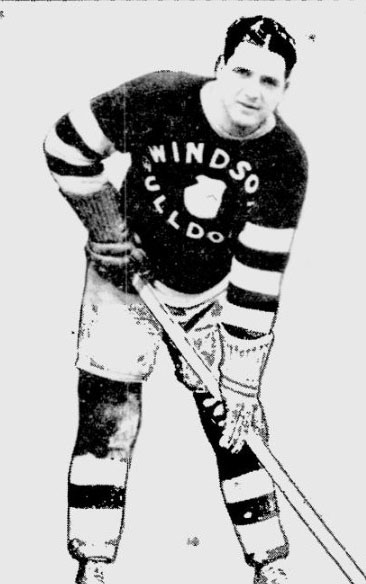
- Born: March 9, 1911; Ottawa, Ontario, Canada
- Died: August 22, 1975 (aged 64); Verdun, Quebec, Canada
- Height: 5 ft 9 in (175 cm)
- Weight: 181 lb (82 kg; 12 st 13 lb)
- Position: Left wing
- Shot: Left
- Played for: Chicago Black Hawks
- Playing career: 1928–1942

Adelard Alexander "Eddie" Ouellette (March 9, 1911 – August 22, 1975) was a Canadian ice hockey left winger who played 43 games in the National Hockey League with the Chicago Black Hawks during the 1935–36 season. The rest of his career, which lasted from 1928 to 1942, was spent in the minor leagues.

== Playing career ==
Born in Ottawa, Ontario, Ouellette played juniors in Windsor and Walkerton before joining the Toronto Millionaires of the IHL. He remained in the IHL for six seasons, playing with the Pittsburgh Yellowjackets, Windsor Bulldogs, and London Tecumsehs before being signed by the Black Hawks for the 1935–36 NHL season. He played 43 games that year, serving mostly as a checker. Following his lone NHL season Ouellette joined the Portland Buckaroos of the Pacific Coast Hockey League. He remained there for five years, and retired in 1942 after playing a single season with the Lachine Flyers of the Quebec Provincial Hockey League.

== Career statistics ==
=== Regular season and playoffs ===
			Regular season					Playoffs
Season	Team	League	GP	G	A	Pts	PIM	GP	G	A	Pts	PIM
1928–29	Windsor Walkerton Tech	MOHL	—	—	—	—	—	—	—	—	—	—
1929–30	Toronto Millionaires	IHL	18	3	5	8	15	—	—	—	—	—
1930–31	Pittsburgh Yellow Jackets	IHL	44	2	5	7	26	6	0	0	0	2
1931–32	Pittsburgh Yellow Jackets	IHL	2	0	0	0	0	—	—	—	—	—
1931–32	Windsor Bulldogs	IHL	37	9	4	13	26	6	0	0	0	2
1932–33	Windsor Bulldogs	IHL	43	7	10	17	63	6	2	0	2	4
1933–34	London Tecumsehs	IHL	42	9	19	28	15	6	2	0	2	6
1934–35	London Tecumsehs	IHL	44	15	25	40	50	5	1	2	3	4
1935–36	Chicago Black Hawks	NHL	43	3	2	5	11	1	0	0	0	0
1936–37	Portland Buckaroos	PCHL	39	18	8	26	50	3	0	1	1	0
1937–38	Portland Buckaroos	PCHL	42	12	20	32	63	2	2	0	2	4
1938–39	Portland Buckaroos	PCHL	48	32	30	62	64	5	3	4	7	10
1939–40	Portland Buckaroos	PCHL	37	13	10	23	53	4	2	2	4	0
1940–41	Portland Buckaroos	PCHL	47	21	22	43	59	—	—	—	—	—
1941–42	Lachine Flyers	QPHL	18	4	5	9	12	2	0	0	0	2
IHL totals			230	45	68	113	195	29	5	2	7	18
PCHL totals			213	96	90	186	289	14	7	7	14	14
NHL totals			43	3	2	5	11	1	0	0	0	0
