= CPHL =

CPHL may refer to:

- Central Professional Hockey League, a minor pro league that operated in the United States from 1963 through 1984
- Canadian Professional Hockey League, a minor pro league that operated predominantly in Canada from 1926 through 1929
