= Hamilton Tigers =

Hamilton Tigers may refer to:

== Baseball ==
- Hamilton Tigers (1918), a former baseball team which played part of one season in the International League in 1918
- Hamilton Tigers (Michigan-Ontario League), a former baseball team which played several seasons in the Michigan-Ontario League from 1919-1923

== Gridiron football ==
- Hamilton Tigers (football), a former Canadian football team
- Hamilton Tiger-Cats, a current CFL team formed from merger of Hamilton Tigers football team and Hamilton Wild Cats football team.

== Ice hockey ==
- Hamilton Tigers (CPHL), a former minor league team formed after the dissolution of NHL team
- Hamilton Tigers (OHA), a former amateur senior team which played in the Ontario Hockey Association
- Hamilton Tigers (NHL), a former National Hockey League team based in Hamilton, Ontario
