= Toronto Ravinas =

Minor professional ice hockey team

The Toronto Ravinas / Toronto Falcons were a minor league professional hockey team that competed in the Canadian Professional Hockey League in the 1927–28 season.

The team was a minor league affiliate of the Toronto Maple Leafs of the National Hockey League. Future Leaf hall-of-famer Joe Primeau was the team's leading scorer. Ex-Leaf Bert Corbeau was also on the team, winding up his professional career in the Canpro league. The Ravinas were coached by Frank J. Selke, who would be hired as assistant to Leafs managing director Conn Smythe in 1929.

The Leafs bought the team in February 1928 and renamed them the Falcons. The club initially played its home games at Ravina Gardens in what was then Toronto's west end. Attendance was poor—even the season opener only attracted 1,500 fans—and the Leafs moved the Falcons to Arena Gardens for some games after they purchased the team. The Falcons would also play some home games late in the season in Brantford, Ontario when crowds remained poor in Toronto. With the Falcons fighting for a playoff position, they drew a crowd of 700 to Ravina Gardens on March 14, 1928.

The team finished the season with a 20–18–4 record over 42 games, which was good for third place in the eight-team league. The Falcons disbanded at the end of the year, with several players joining the London Panthers the following season.
