= Toronto Millionaires =

- City: Toronto, Ontario
- League: Canadian Professional Hockey League (1927–1929); International Hockey League (1929–1930)
- Founded: 1927
- Folded: 1930

Franchise history
- 1927–1928: Kitchener Millionaires
- 1928–1930: Toronto Millionaires

The Toronto Millionaires were a Canadian minor professional ice hockey team located in Toronto, Ontario. The franchise was around for three seasons, beginning in the Canadian Professional Hockey League and ending with the International Hockey League.

== History ==
The franchise began in the second season of the CPHL as the 'Kitchener Millionaires'. After finishing as runners up for the league championship, the club moved to Toronto for their second season. After the year, the entire league disbanded and reformed as the IHL. Toronto had a terrible season in the new league, finishing seventh out of eight teams and then folded in the offseason.

== Season-by-season record ==
Season	GP	W	L	T	Pts	GF	GA	Place	coach	Playoffs
1927–28	42	19	17	6	44	105	110	3rd	Alf Skinner	Runner Up
1928–29	42	19	16	7	45	94	88	3rd	Hap Holmes	Semifinals
1929–30	42	10	28	4	24	84	172	7th	Hugh Lehman	missed
Totals	126	48	61	17	–	283	370	–	–	–
