= Niagara Falls Cataracts =

- City: Niagara Falls, Ontario
- League: Canadian Professional Hockey League (1926–1929); International Hockey League (1929–1930)
- Founded: 1926
- Folded: 1930

The Niagara Falls Cataracts were a Canadian minor professional ice hockey team located in Niagara Falls, Ontario. The franchise played for four seasons with the first three coming in the Canadian Professional Hockey League. In 1929, the league was reformed as the International Hockey League.

== History ==
Niagara was one of the founding members of the CPHL in 1926 which consisted entirely of Canadian teams from southern Ontario. The team was rather unsuccessful, finishing last in the league in two out of three seasons. Despite their struggles, the Cataracts joined the rest of the league members in 1929 by dissolving the CPHL and reforming in the International Hockey League. Niagara once again finished last in the standings and decided to call it quits after the season.

During their final season, tragedy befell a member of the team when Edward Baker was fatally injured during a game. On January 9, against the Buffalo Bisons, Baker collided with his teammate, Lloyd Gross and suffered a skull fracture as a result. Baker remained conscious and skated off of the ice under his own power. He was later taken to a local hospital where he died the following morning at the age of 26. His death was ruled to have been accidental and no inquest was held.

Former NHL star and Hockey Hall of Famer Newsy Lalonde coached Niagara Falls during the 1928–29 season.

== Season-by-season record ==
Season	GP	W	L	T	Pts	GF	GA	Place	Playoffs
1926–27	32	12	19	1	25	78	81	5th	missed
1927–28	42	13	17	12	36	89	99	6th	missed
1928–29	42	12	28	2	26	70	128	8th	missed
1929–30	42	7	28	7	21	72	133	8th	missed
Totals	158	44	92	22	–	309	441	–	–
