= 1926–27 Canadian Professional Hockey League season =

Professional ice hockey league season of play

The 1926–27 CPHL season was the first season of the Canadian Professional Hockey League, a minor professional ice hockey league in Ontario, Canada. Five teams participated in the league, and the London Panthers won the championship.

== Regular season ==
	GP	W	L	T	GF	GA	Pts
Stratford Nationals	32	20	12	0	92	81	50
Hamilton Tigers	32	16	15	1	81	78	33
London Panthers	32	16	15	1	89	78	33
Windsor Hornets	32	14	17	1	72	95	29
Niagara Falls Cataracts	32	12	19	1	78	81	25

== Playoffs ==
=== Semi-final ===
Best of 3

Date	Winner	Loser	Location
March 11	London 7	Hamilton 6	Hamilton
March 14	London 2	Hamilton 1	London

London Panthers beat Hamilton Tigers 2 wins to none.

=== Final ===
Best of 3

Date	Winner	Loser	Location
March 18	London 2	Stratford 0	Stratford
March 21	London 2	Stratford 1	London

London Panthers beat Stratford Nationals 2 wins to none.
