= London Panthers =

Canadian professional ice hockey team

The London Panthers were a professional ice hockey team based in London, Ontario, Canada that existed from 1926 until 1936. The team played in the Canadian Professional Hockey League from 1926, joining the International Hockey League in 1929. In 1930, the team was renamed the London Tecumsehs. The team played at the London Arena.

The team was disbanded after the International League announced it would merge with the Can-Am League on October 4, 1936.

== Season record ==
Season	GP	W	L	T	Pts	Finish	Playoffs
1926–27	32	16	15	1	33		CPHL champions
1927–28	42	14	26	2	30		
1928–29	42	16	22	4	36		
1929–30	42	24	13	5	53		
1930–31	48	21	21	6	48		
1931–32	48	21	15	12	54		
1932–33	44	27	9	8	62		
1933–34	44	18	17	9	45		IHL champions
1934–35	44	21	17	6	48		
1935–36	48	23	22	3	49		

== Notable players ==
Several of the players also played in the National Hockey League:

- Benny Grant - 1927–28
- Milt Halliday - 1927–28
- Sailor Herbert - 1929–30
- Eddie Ouellette - 1934–35
- Eric Pettinger - 1930–1936
- Joe Primeau - 1928–29
- Carl Voss - 1928–29
