= 1931–32 IHL season =

Ice hockey league season

The 1931–32 IHL season was the third season of the International Hockey League, a minor professional ice hockey league in the Midwestern and Eastern United States and Canada. Seven teams participated in the league, and the Buffalo Bisons won the championship.

== Regular season ==
	GP	W	L	T	GF	GA	Pts
Buffalo Bisons	48	25	14	9	106	80	59
London Tecumsehs	48	21	15	12	92	70	54
Windsor Bulldogs	48	21	16	11	123	104	53
Detroit Olympics	48	19	19	10	96	97	48
Pittsburgh Yellow Jackets	48	17	22	9	91	118	43
Syracuse Stars	48	16	23	9	111	118	41
Cleveland Indians	48	15	25	8	110	142	38

== Playoffs ==
Date	Visiting team	Home team
March 29	London 3	Buffalo 3
March 29	Windsor 1	Detroit 0
March 31	Buffalo 0	Windsor 0
March 31	Detroit 0	London 0
April 2	Windsor 1	Buffalo 3
April 3	London 0	Detroit 0
April 5	Detroit 4	Windsor 2
April 5	Buffalo 0	London 1
April 7	Detroit 0	Buffalo 4
April 7	Windsor 3	London 0
April 9	London 1	Windsor 4
April 10	Buffalo 2	Detroit 1

Round Robin Playoffs	GP	W	L	T	GF	GA	Pts
Buffalo Bisons	6	3	1	2	12	6	8
Windsor Bulldogs	6	3	2	1	11	8	7
London Tecumsehs	6	1	2	3	5	10	5
Detroit Olympics	6	1	3	2	5	9	4
