= 1927–28 Canadian Professional Hockey League season =

Professional ice hockey league season of play

The 1927–28 CPHL season was the second season of the Canadian Professional Hockey League, a minor professional ice hockey league in Ontario, Canada, with one team based in Detroit, Michigan. Eight teams participated in the league, and the Stratford Nationals won the championship.

== Regular season ==
Overall	GP	W	L	T	Pts	GF	GA
Stratford Nationals	42	25	12	5	55	104	53
Detroit Olympics	42	24	14	4	52	99	75
Kitchener Millionaires	42	19	17	6	44	105	110
Toronto Ravinas	42	20	18	4	44	93	95
Hamilton Tigers	42	18	18	6	42	100	97
Niagara Falls Cataracts	42	13	17	12	36	89	99
Windsor Bulldogs	42	13	24	5	31	115	138
London Panthers	42	14	26	2	30	103	141

The Toronto Ravinas changed their name to the Toronto Falcons on February 13. The Falcons would finish the season playing games in Brantford, Ontario, as attendance was poor in Toronto. The Falcons thrived in Brantford, passing Hamilton to take fourth place, the final playoff position.

== Playoffs ==
=== Semifinals ===
Best of 3

- Toronto 0 @ Stratford 4
- Stratford 7 Toronto 1 @ Windsor

Stratford Nationals beat Toronto Falcons 2 wins to none.

- Kitchener 1 @ Detroit 0
- Kitchener 3 @ Detroit 1

Kitchener Millionaires beat Detroit Olympics 2 wins to none.

Both games were played in Detroit because the attendance was larger.

=== Final ===
Best of 3

- Stratford 1 @ Kitchener 1
- Kitchener 1 @ Stratford 6
- Stratford 5 Kitchener 0 @ Detroit

Stratford Nationals beat Kitchener Millionaires 2 wins to none, 1 tie.
