= 1928–29 Canadian Professional Hockey League season =

Season of play of professional ice hockey league

The 1928–29 CPHL season was the third season of the Canadian Professional Hockey League, a minor professional ice hockey league in Ontario, Canada, with one team based in Detroit, Michigan and another based in Buffalo, New York. Eight teams participated in the league, and the Windsor Bulldogs won the championship.

== Regular season ==
Overall	GP	W	L	T	Pts	GF	GA
Detroit Olympics	42	27	10	5	59	131	67
Windsor Bulldogs	42	25	12	5	55	114	76
Toronto Millionaires	42	19	16	7	45	94	88
Kitchener Flying Dutchmen	42	19	19	4	42	105	113
Buffalo Bisons	42	17	18	7	41	89	72
London Panthers	42	16	22	4	36	86	113
Hamilton Tigers	42	14	24	4	32	83	115
Niagara Falls Cataracts	42	12	28	2	26	70	128

== Playoffs ==
=== Semifinals ===
Best of 3

- Toronto 0 @ Detroit 3
- Toronto 5 @ Detroit 6

Detroit Olympics beat Toronto Millionaires 2 wins to none.

- Kitchener 1 @ Windsor 0
- Kitchener 1 @ Windsor 2
- Kitchener 0 @ Windsor 4

Windsor Bulldogs beat Kitchener Flying Dutchmen 2 wins to 1.

=== Final ===
Best of 5

- Windsor 1 @ Detroit 2
- Detroit 0 @ Windsor 2
- Windsor 0 @ Detroit 2
- Detroit 0 @ Windsor 3
- Windsor 3 Detroit 1 @ Fort Erie

Windsor Bulldogs beat Detroit Olympics 3 wins to 2.
