= 1930–31 IHL season =

North American ice hockey season

The 1930–31 IHL season was the second season of the International Hockey League, a minor professional ice hockey league in the Midwestern and Eastern United States and Canada. Seven teams participated in the league, and the Windsor Bulldogs won the championship.

== Regular season ==
	GP	W	L	T	GF	GA	Pts
Buffalo Bisons	48	30	13	5	115	76	65
Windsor Bulldogs	48	25	16	7	141	114	57
Cleveland Indians	48	24	18	6	131	112	54
Pittsburgh Yellow Jackets	48	21	18	9	101	108	51
London Tecumsehs	48	21	21	6	89	83	48
Detroit Olympics	48	18	28	2	100	127	38
Syracuse Stars	48	9	34	5	114	171	23

== Playoffs ==
Date	Visiting team	Home team
March 24	Pittsburgh 1	Cleveland 2
March 26	Buffalo 2	Pittsburgh 0
March 26	Cleveland 1	Windsor 3
March 28	Windsor 5	Cleveland 6
March 28	Pittsburgh 1	Buffalo 3
March 31	Buffalo 1	Windsor 2
March 31	Cleveland 3	Pittsburgh 1
April 2	Pittsburgh 2	Windsor 8
April 2	Cleveland 1	Buffalo 1
April 4	Windsor 2	Pittsburgh 1
April 4	Buffalo 6	Cleveland 4
April 7	Windsor 0	Buffalo 0

Round Robin Playoffs	GP	W	L	T	GF	GA	Pts
Windsor Bulldogs	6	4	1	1	20	11	9
Buffalo Bisons	6	3	1	2	13	8	8
Cleveland Indians	6	3	2	1	17	17	7
Pittsburgh Yellow Jackets	6	0	6	0	6	20	0
