= 1929–30 IHL season =

Professional ice hockey league season of play

The 1929–30 IHL season was the first season of the International Hockey League, a minor professional ice hockey league in the Midwestern United States and Canada. Eight teams participated in the league, and the Cleveland Indians won the championship.

== Regular season ==
| | GP | W | L | T | GF | GA | Pts |
|---|---|---|---|---|---|---|---|
| Cleveland Indians | 42 | 24 | 9 | 9 | 125 | 78 | 57 |
| Buffalo Bisons | 42 | 26 | 12 | 4 | 102 | 68 | 56 |
| London Tecumsehs | 42 | 24 | 13 | 5 | 117 | 93 | 53 |
| Detroit Olympics | 42 | 21 | 12 | 9 | 120 | 74 | 51 |
| Windsor Bulldogs | 42 | 20 | 14 | 8 | 123 | 93 | 48 |
| Hamilton Tigers | 42 | 9 | 25 | 8 | 95 | 128 | 26 |
| Toronto Millionaires | 42 | 10 | 28 | 4 | 84 | 172 | 24 |
| Niagara Falls Cataracts | 42 | 7 | 28 | 7 | 72 | 133 | 21 |

== Playoffs ==
=== Semifinals ===
Best of 3

| Date | Visiting team | Home team |
|---|---|---|
| March 20 | Detroit 1 | Buffalo 5 |
| March 23 | Buffalo 1 | Detroit 3 |
| March 25 | Detroit 0 | Buffalo 1 |

Buffalo beat Detroit 2 wins to 1.

| Date | Visiting team | Home team |
|---|---|---|
| March 20 | Cleveland 1 | London 0 |
| March 22 | London 2 | Cleveland 3 |

Cleveland beat London 2 wins to none.

=== Final ===
Best of 5

| Date | Visiting team | Home team |
|---|---|---|
| March 27 | Cleveland 2 | Buffalo 3 |
| March 29 | Buffalo 1 | Cleveland 3 |
| April 1 | Cleveland 1 | Buffalo 0 |
| April 3 | Buffalo 0 | Cleveland 3 |

Cleveland beat Buffalo 3 wins to 1.
