= Canadian Professional Hockey League =

Minor pro league that operated predominantly in Canada from 1926 through 1929

The Canadian Professional Hockey League, also known as Can-Pro, was a minor professional hockey league founded in 1926. After three seasons, it became the International Hockey League (IHL) in 1929. The Can-Pro name was then given to a new league of IHL farm teams which operated in the 1929–30 season.

== The first Can-Pro league (1926–1929) ==
The initial meeting to organize a new league was held on June 27, 1926, in Hamilton, Ontario. The governing body for amateur hockey in Ontario, the Ontario Hockey Association, had been cracking down on teams that induced players to move from other areas in violation of the league's residency requirements. In mid-June, the OHA refused to certify over 20 players who had changed residences. Windsor alone had eight players who were denied OHA certification.

In response, and also driven by the recent expansion of professional hockey in North America, seven OHA senior teams met to discuss forming a minor professional league that would be affiliated with the National Hockey League. Brantford and Toronto were at the initial meeting, but had to bow out, and the remaining five teams became the inaugural members of the CPHL: Hamilton, London, Niagara Falls, Stratford and Windsor. Charles King of Windsor was made league president on August 4 and served in that role for all three seasons the CPHL operated.

After the 1927–28 season, all the players on the Hamilton Tigers were purchased by the new Buffalo Bisons (a team based in Fort Erie), and an entirely new team played in Hamilton. Teddy Oke's Kitchener Millionaires moved to Toronto to take the place of the Toronto Ravinas which disbanded in 1928. Oke sold the franchise rights to Kitchener to a new owner, who created the Kitchener Flying Dutchmen. The team included players from the Millionaires that did not move to Toronto.

The league championship in 1929 was a cross-border matchup between the Windsor Bulldogs and the Detroit Olympics, with Windsor winning the championship. Five of the eight teams had lost money during the season, including all the Canadian teams except the Bulldogs. Before the 1929 playoffs were over, it was rumoured that the league would be replaced by an international league the following season and that a lower-level minor league would be created in Ontario.

The league held its annual meeting in September 1929, re-elected King as president, and renamed itself the International Hockey League. The only change in the lineup was that the Kitchener franchise was transferred to Cleveland, Ohio, with the Kitchener players reassigned to Toronto and Toronto's players sent to Cleveland.

=== Franchises ===
- Buffalo Bisons: 1928–29, joined the IHL in 1929
- Detroit Olympics: 1927–28, 1928–29, joined the IHL in 1929
- Hamilton Tigers: 1926–27, 1927–28, 1928–29, joined the IHL in 1929
- Kitchener Flying Dutchmen: 1928–29
- Kitchener Millionaires: 1927–28
- London Panthers: 1926–27, 1927–28, 1928–29, joined the IHL in 1929
- Niagara Falls Cataracts: 1926–27, 1927–28, 1928–29, joined the IHL in 1929
- Stratford Nationals: 1926–27, 1927–28
- Toronto Millionaires: 1928–29, joined the IHL in 1929
- Toronto Ravinas/Falcons: 1927–28
- Windsor Hornets/Windsor Bulldogs: 1926–27, 1927–28, 1928–29, joined the IHL in 1929

=== Championships ===
- 1927: London Panthers defeated Stratford Nationals (4–1, total goals)
- 1928: Stratford Nationals defeated Kitchener Millionaires (2–0, best-of-three)
- 1929: Windsor Bulldogs defeated Detroit Olympics (3–2, best-of-five)

== The second Can-Pro league (1929–1930) ==
Teddy Oke led the organization of the minor pro hockey league in Ontario, designed to be a farm system for the IHL teams and a step up from existing industrial leagues. It took the abandoned Can-Pro name with teams in Kitchener, Galt, Guelph, and Brantford. League president was Robert Dawson of Guelph, Ontario. There were no artificial ice rinks in Guelph, so the Maple Leafs played all their games on the road until the weather was cold enough to support ice at the Royal City Arena in Guelph. The league disbanded after one season, with Galt and Guelph joining the Ontario Professional Hockey League.

=== Franchises ===
- Brantford Indians
- Galt Terriers
- Guelph Maple Leafs
- Kitchener Flying Dutchmen

=== Championships ===
- 1930: Guelph Maple Leafs defeated Galt Terriers (3–1, best-of-five)
