= 1925–26 Montreal Canadiens season =

NHL hockey team season

1925–26 Montreal Canadiens
- Prince of Wales Trophy winners
- League: 7th NHL
- 1925–26 record: 11–24–1
- Home record: 5–12–1
- Road record: 6–12–0
- Goals for: 79
- Goals against: 108

Team information
- General manager: Leo Dandurand
- Coach: Cecil Hart
- Captain: Billy Coutu
- Arena: Montreal Forum; Mount Royal Arena

Team leaders
- Goals: Howie Morenz (23)
- Assists: Aurel Joliat (9)
- Points: Howie Morenz (26); Aurel Joliat (26)
- Penalty minutes: Billy Boucher (118)
- Wins: Herb Rheaume (10)
- Goals against average: Herb Rheaume (2.93)

The 1925–26 Montreal Canadiens season was the team's 17th season and ninth as a member of the National Hockey League (NHL). The Canadiens lost their star goalie Georges Vezina to tuberculosis and struggled as a team, not making the playoffs for the first time since the 1921–22 season this is the first time the team finished last in the NHL since they joined in 1917. The league added teams in Pittsburgh and New York, New York taking the players of the former Hamilton Tigers franchise.

The team had a large turnover of personnel, partly due to Vezina's leaving. Alphonse Lacroix, Herb Rheaume and Bill Taugher all appeared in the Canadiens' net. New players included Bill Holmes, Wildor Larochelle, Albert Leduc, Alfred Lepine, Hector Lepine, Joe Matte and Roland Paulhus. Departures included the Cleghorn brothers, Odie and Sprague. Odie signed with Pittsburgh as playing-coach and Sprague was traded to the Boston Bruins for $5,000 on November 8, 1925. Cecil Hart took over as coach from Leo Dandurand, and Billy Coutu was named team captain.

== Regular season ==
From 1911 Georges Vezina had been the Montreal Canadiens goaltender, and had led them to the Cup in 1924. In the first game of this season, he collapsed on the ice as the second period got underway. It was found that he had contracted tuberculosis and could no longer play. He went home to Chicoutimi, Quebec, where he died in March 1926. The team struggled with several goaltenders before Herb Rheaume won the job, but the team finished last.

In the second half of the season, the team had a twelve-game losing streak, from February 13, losing 0–3 to Pittsburgh, until March 16, winning 6–1 over Toronto.

=== Final standings ===
National Hockey League
Teams	GP	W	L	T	GF	GA	PIM	Pts
**Ottawa Senators**	36	24	8	4	77	42	341	52
**Montreal Maroons**	36	20	11	5	91	73	554	45
**Pittsburgh Pirates**	36	19	16	1	82	70	264	39
Boston Bruins	36	17	15	4	92	85	279	38
New York Americans	36	12	20	4	68	89	361	28
Toronto St. Patricks	36	12	21	3	92	114	325	27
Montreal Canadiens	36	11	24	1	79	108	458	23

Note: W = Wins, L = Losses, T = Ties, Pts = Points, GF = Goals for, GA = Goals against, PIM = Penalties in minutes
Note: Teams that qualified for the playoffs are highlighted in bold.

=== Record vs. opponents ===
1925–26 NHL Records
Team	BOS	MTL	MTM	NYA	OTT	PIT	TOR
Boston	—	2–3–1	4–1–1	2–2–2	2–4	2–4	5–1
M. Canadiens	3–2–1	—	1–5	2–4	0–6	2–4	3–3
M. Maroons	1–4–1	5–1	—	4–1–1	1–2–3	3–3	6–0
New York	2–2–2	4–2	1–4–1	—	1–5	3–3	1–1–4
Ottawa	4–2	6–0	2–1–3	5–1	—	4–2	3–1–2
Pittsburgh	4–2	4–2	3–3	3–3	2–4	—	3–2–1
Toronto	1–5	3–3	0–6	1–1–4	1–3–2	2–3–1	—

== Schedule and results ==
1925–26 regular season
November

Game	Result	Date	Score	Opponent	Record
1	L	November 28, 1925	0–1	Pittsburgh Pirates (1925–26)	0–1–0

December

Game	Result	Date	Score	Opponent	Record
2	W	December 1, 1925	3–2	@ Boston Bruins (1925–26)	1–1–0
3	L	December 3, 1925	2–3	Montreal Maroons (1925–26)	1–2–0
4	L	December 8, 1925	2–6	New York Americans (1925–26)	1–3–0
5	L	December 12, 1925	0–4	@ Toronto St. Patricks (1925–26)	1–4–0
6	W	December 15, 1925	3–1	@ New York Americans (1925–26)	2–4–0
7	L	December 17, 1925	0–3	@ Ottawa Senators (1925–26)	2–5–0
8	W	December 19, 1925	6–5 OT	Boston Bruins (1925–26)	3–5–0
9	L	December 26, 1925	0–3	Ottawa Senators (1925–26)	3–6–0
10	W	December 30, 1925	7–4	@ Montreal Maroons (1925–26)	4–6–0

January

Game	Result	Date	Score	Opponent	Record
11	W	January 1, 1926	2–1	@ Pittsburgh Pirates (1925–26)	5–6–0
12	W	January 5, 1926	5–4	Toronto St. Patricks (1925–26)	6–6–0
13	L	January 9, 1926	1–2	New York Americans (1925–26)	6–7–0
14	W	January 12, 1926	4–2	@ Boston Bruins (1925–26)	7–7–0
15	W	January 13, 1926	2–1	@ New York Americans (1925–26)	8–7–0
16	L	January 16, 1926	0–1	@ Montreal Maroons (1925–26)	8–8–0
17	L	January 19, 1926	1–2	Ottawa Senators (1925–26)	8–9–0
18	L	January 23, 1926	2–6	@ Toronto St. Patricks (1925–26)	8–10–0
19	W	January 26, 1926	6–3	Toronto St. Patricks (1925–26)	9–10–0
20	L	January 28, 1926	2–4	@ Ottawa Senators (1925–26)	9–11–0

February

Game	Result	Date	Score	Opponent	Record
21	L	February 2, 1926	0–2	Montreal Maroons (1925–26)	9–12–0
22	T	February 6, 1926	3–3 OT	Boston Bruins (1925–26)	9–12–1
23	W	February 9, 1926	4–2	Pittsburgh Pirates (1925–26)	10–12–1
24	L	February 13, 1926	0–3	@ Pittsburgh Pirates (1925–26)	10–13–1
25	L	February 16, 1926	0–1	Ottawa Senators (1925–26)	10–14–1
26	L	February 18, 1926	2–4	@ Ottawa Senators (1925–26)	10–15–1
27	L	February 20, 1926	1–3	Boston Bruins (1925–26)	10–16–1
28	L	February 23, 1926	2–3	@ Pittsburgh Pirates (1925–26)	10–17–1
29	L	February 24, 1926	1–6	@ New York Americans (1925–26)	10–18–1
30	L	February 27, 1926	0–1	New York Americans (1925–26)	10–19–1

March

Game	Result	Date	Score	Opponent	Record
31	L	March 2, 1926	1–4	@ Boston Bruins (1925–26)	10–20–1
32	L	March 6, 1926	3–4 OT	Montreal Maroons (1925–26)	10–21–1
33	L	March 9, 1926	3–4	Pittsburgh Pirates (1925–26)	10–22–1
34	L	March 11, 1926	3–5	@ Toronto St. Patricks (1925–26)	10–23–1
35	L	March 13, 1926	2–4	@ Montreal Maroons (1925–26)	10–24–1
36	W	March 16, 1926	6–1	Toronto St. Patricks (1925–26)	11–24–1

Legend: Win (2 points) Loss (0 points) Tie (1 point)

== Player statistics ==
=== Scoring leaders ===
Note: GP = Games played; G = Goals; A = Assists; Pts = Points

Player	GP	G	A	Pts
Howie Morenz	31	23	3	26
Aurel Joliat	35	17	9	26
Pit Lepine	32	10	3	13
Billy Boucher	34	8	5	13
Albert Leduc	32	9	1	10

=== Leading goaltenders ===
GP = Games played, GA = Goals against, SO = shutouts, GAA = Goals against average

Player	GP	GA	SO	GAA
Georges Vezina	1	0	0	0.0
Bill Taugher	1	3	0	3.0
Herb Rheaume	29	89	0	3.1
Alphonse Lacroix	5	16	0	3.43

== Awards and records ==
- Prince of Wales Trophy – awarded for winning first game in Madison Square Garden, December 15, 1925.

== See also ==
- 1925–26 NHL season
