= 1925–26 Ottawa Senators season =

National Hockey League team season

1925–26 Ottawa Senators
- League: 1st NHL
- 1925–26 record: 24–8–4
- Home record: 15–2–1
- Road record: 9–6–3
- Goals for: 77
- Goals against: 42

Team information
- General manager: Dave Gill
- Coach: Alex Currie
- Captain: Cy Denneny
- Arena: Ottawa Auditorium

Team leaders
- Goals: Cy Denneny (24)
- Assists: Frank Nighbor (13)
- Points: Cy Denneny (36)
- Penalty minutes: King Clancy (80)
- Wins: Alec Connell (24)
- Goals against average: Alec Connell (1.12)

The 1925–26 Ottawa Senators season was the club's 41st season of play and ninth season in the NHL. The Senators placed first during the regular season but were upset in the playoffs by the Montreal Maroons.

== Off-season ==
The Hamilton Tigers franchise folded and their players would be purchased by the New York Americans expansion team, while the Pittsburgh Pirates would also join the NHL, making it a seven team league.

Prior to the season, Tommy Gorman and Ted Dey sold their interests in the team to T. Franklin Ahearn, who then hired Dave Gill to be the GM, and former Senators player Alex Currie as head coach.

== Pre-season ==
The Senators welcomed the Stanley Cup champion Victoria Cougars to town for two exhibition games on November 19 and 21, with proceeds to the Ottawa Humane Society. Ottawa won both games, 6–2 and 2–0.

== Regular season ==
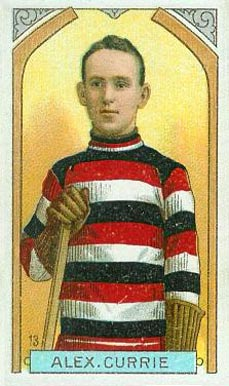
Coach Alex Currie

Ottawa, who missed the playoffs the previous season, would go on to finish with a league best 24–8–4 record, and earn a bye in the first round of the playoffs, however, they were upset by the Montreal Maroons in the NHL final, losing the two-game total-goal series 2–1. Cy Denneny would once again lead the club offensively, scoring 24 goals and 36 points, while Frank Nighbor would win the Lady Byng Trophy for the 2nd straight season.

=== November/December ===
- **November 28** – Ottawa opened the season on home ice for a game against the Montreal Maroons. Frank Nighbor, Cy Denneny and Hooley Smith each scored powerplay goals in the second period, as the Senators overcame a 2–0 deficit to open the season with a 3–2 victory.
- **December 3** – The Boston Bruins were in Ottawa for the second game of the Senators season opening four-game homestand. Frank Nighbor and Georges Boucher each scored a goal, while Alec Connell earned the shutout, as Ottawa beat the Bruins 2–0.
- **December 5** – The expansion team Pittsburgh Pirates visited Ottawa, as the teams matched up for the first time. Georges Boucher scored the lone goal of the game midway through the third period, as Alec Connell recorded his second straight shutout, as the Senators defeated the Pirates 1–0.
- **December 10** – The Senators wrapped up their four-game homestand with their first ever meeting against the New York Americans. Frank Nighbor scored twice and added an assist, and Alec Connell recorded his third consecutive shutout, as the Senators defeated New York 3–0.
- **December 12** – Ottawa travelled to the Montreal Forum for their first road game, a date against the Montreal Maroons. Cy Denneny and Edwin Gorman each scored, but the Maroons snapped the Senators four game winning streak, as Ottawa lost 5–2.
- **December 15** – Ottawa wrapped up a two-game road trip with a visit to Boston Arena for a matchup against the Boston Bruins. Cy Denneny scored twice, including the game winning goal in the third period, as Ottawa took the win by a score of 2–1.
- **December 17** – The Senators returned home to face the Montreal Canadiens. Cy Denneny scored two goals and Alec Connell recorded his fourth shutout of the season, as Ottawa improved to 6–1–0 on the season with a 3–0 victory.
- **December 23** – Ottawa faced the Toronto St. Patricks for their final game before Christmas. Georges Boucher scored three goals, leading Ottawa to a 4–2 win.
- **December 26** – The Senators began a three-game road trip with a visit to Mount Royal Arena to face the Montreal Canadiens. Cy Denneny recorded a goal and two assists and Alec Connell earned his fifth shutout of the season, as the Senators defeated the Canadiens 3–0.
- **December 30** – Ottawa continued their road trip with their first ever visit to Duquesne Garden for a game against the Pittsburgh Pirates. Cy Denneny scored twice to lead the offense and Alec Connell recorded his second straight shutout, and sixth of the season, as Ottawa defeated Pittsburgh 5–0.

The club finished the month with a very impressive 9–1–0 record in 10 games, earning 18 points. The Senators were in first place as they held a two point lead on the second place Montreal Maroons.

=== January ===
- **January 1** – The Senators wrapped up their three-game road trip with a visit to Mutual Street Arena to face the Toronto St. Patricks on New Year's Day. Toronto, led by Babe Dye who had a goal and assist and John Ross Roach, who stopped every shot he faced, ended the Senators five game winning streak.
- **January 5** – The Senators returned home for the first game of a home-and-home series against the Montreal Maroons. Cy Denneny scored a goal and earned an assist and Alec Connell recorded his seventh shutout of the season, as Ottawa beat the Maroons 4–0.
- **January 7** – Ottawa and the Montreal Maroons faced off for the second straight game, this time in Montreal. Edwin Gorman scored the lone Senators goal midway through the second period, as the two clubs skated to a 1–1 draw.
- **January 11** – The Senators were on the road for their first ever visit to Madison Square Garden to face the New York Americans. In a tightly defensive game, the score remained 0–0 heading into overtime. In the extra period, King Clancy scored the game winning goal, as Ottawa won the game 1–0. Alec Connell recorded his eighth shutout of the season.
- **January 13** – The Senators returned home for a meeting against the Pittsburgh Pirates. Hooley Smith scored the lone goal of the game, as Ottawa shutout Pittsburgh 1–0. Alec Connell earned his second consecutive shutout and ninth of the season.
- **January 19** – Ottawa was on the road for this game, a matchup against the Montreal Canadiens. Cy Denneny scored a goal and earned an assist, while Frank Nighbor also scored a goal, as Ottawa defeated Montreal 2–1. The win extended the Senators unbeaten streak to five games.
- **January 21** – Ottawa was back at home for a date against the New York Americans. Ottawa built a 3–0 lead on goals from Cy Denneny, King Clancy and Hec Kilrea before a third period push by New York cut the Senators lead to 3–2. The Senators held off the Americans to take the win.
- **January 26** – The Senators were on the road for a game against the Boston Bruins. Ottawa stormed out to a 7–0 lead after two periods and cruised to a 8–2 victory, extending their unbeaten streak to seven games. Hooley Smith scored three goals and added two assists, while King Clancy and Hec Kilrea each scored twice.
- **January 28** – Ottawa travelled back home for a match against the Montreal Canadiens. The Senators, led by a three goal game by Hooley Smith, defeated the Canadiens 4–2 to improve to 7–0–1 in their last eight games.
- **January 30** – The Senators travelled to New York for a meeting against the New York Americans. Hooley Smith scored the lone goal of the game, as Alec Connell recorded his tenth shutout of the season, to lead Ottawa to a 1–0 victory. The win extended the Senators unbeaten streak to nine games.

The Senators had a league-best record of 17–2–1 at the end of January, earning 35 points. The team earned a record of 8–1–1 in ten games during the month. The club had a lead of eight points over the Montreal Maroons, who sat in second place in the NHL standings.

=== February ===
- **February 2** – Ottawa finished their two-game road trip with a game against the Pittsburgh Pirates. Roy Worters of the Pirates ended the Senators nine game unbeaten streak, as he stopped every Senators shot. Herb Drury scored the lone goal of the game, as Ottawa lost 1–0.
- **February 4** – The Senators were back at home to face the Boston Bruins. The Bruins took a 3–0 lead into the third period, and despite goals from Cy Denneny and Georges Boucher, the Senators lost the game 3–2 for their second straight loss.
- **February 6** – The Senators were on the road to open a home-and-home series against the Toronto St. Patricks. Ottawa's offensive struggles continued, as Hec Kilrea scored the only goal for the Senators, in a 4–1 loss to the St. Patricks. The suddenly struggling Senators lost their third consecutive game.
- **February 11** – Ottawa was back home to face the Toronto St. Patricks for the second straight game. Two shorthanded goals by Cy Denneny was enough for the Senators to snap their losing skid, as they defeated Toronto 2–1.
- **February 16** – Ottawa travelled to Montreal to face the Montreal Canadiens for a home-and-home series. King Clancy scored the only goal of the game, as Alec Connell earned his eleventh shutout of the season, helping Ottawa to a 1–0 win.
- **February 18** – Back on home ice, the Senators faced the Montreal Canadiens for the backend of a home-and-home series. Cy Denneny recorded three goals, while Hooley Smith earned three assists, as the Senators beat Montreal 4–2 to win their third consecutive game.
- **February 20** – The Senators welcomed the Montreal Maroons to Ottawa for the first game of a home-and-home series. The two teams skated to a 0–0 tie, as Alec Connell earned his twelfth shutout of the season. Former Senators goaltender Clint Benedict earned the shutout for the Maroons.
- **February 23** – Ottawa played a road game against the Montreal Maroons, concluding their home-and-home series. Hooley Smith scored the lone Senators goal, as the Senators and Maroons tied for the second straight game, this time by a score of 1–1. The tie extended Ottawa's unbeaten streak to five games.
- **February 27** – The Senators wrapped up February with a home date against the Boston Bruins. Frank Nighbor led the Senators offense, scoring twice, as Ottawa came from behind to defeat the Bruins 3–2.

Ottawa earned a record of 4–3–2 record in nine games during February. This brought their overall record to 21–5–3, earning 45 points. Ottawa remained in first place in the NHL standings, as they were six points ahead of the second place Montreal Maroons.

=== March ===
- **March 2** – Ottawa began a home-and-home series against the New York Americans on home ice. Cy Denneny scored the lone goal for the Senators, as New York defeated Ottawa 3–1, ending the Senators six game unbeaten streak.
- **March 4** – The Senators faced the New York Americans on the road to conclude their home-and-home series. King Clancy scored a first period goal, while Alec Connell recorded his thirteenth shutout of the year, as Ottawa defeated the Americans 1–0.
- **March 6** – Ottawa concluded their quick two-game road trip with a game against the Boston Bruins. Bruins goaltender Charles Stewart earned the shutout, as the Senators failed to score in a 1–0 loss. Manager Dave Gill filled in for an ill coach Alex Currie.
- **March 8** – Back on home ice, the Senators faced off against the Pittsburgh Pirates. Frank Finnigan scored his first two goals of the season, leading Ottawa to a 3–0 win over the Pirates. Alec Connell earned his fourteenth shutout of the season.
- **March 13** – Ottawa began their final road trip of the season with a matchup against the Toronto St. Patricks. King Clancy scored the only goal for the Senators, as the two teams fought to a 1–1 tie. An illness affected several members of the Senators, with only eight players making the journey to Toronto, and Gill coaching team in the absence of Currie.
- **March 15** – Ottawa played their last road game of the season against the Pittsburgh Pirates. Pirates goaltender Roy Worters earned the shutout, as Pittsburgh defeated Ottawa 2–0.
- **March 17** – The Senators wrapped up the regular season with a home date against the Toronto St. Patricks. Frank Nighbor scored twice and Cy Denneny scored a goal and earned an assist in a 4–0 Senators win. Alec Connell recorded his fifteenth shutout of the season in the victory.

The Senators earned a record of 3–3–1 in seven games in March. The club finished the regular season with a 24–8–4 record, earning 52 points and finishing in first place in the NHL standings, seven points ahead of the second place Montreal Maroons. The Senators advanced to the O'Brien Trophy finals and would play the winner of the second place Montreal Maroons and the third place Pittsburgh Pirates for the NHL championship.

=== Final standings ===
National Hockey League
Teams	GP	W	L	T	GF	GA	PIM	Pts
**Ottawa Senators**	36	24	8	4	77	42	341	52
**Montreal Maroons**	36	20	11	5	91	73	554	45
**Pittsburgh Pirates**	36	19	16	1	82	70	264	39
Boston Bruins	36	17	15	4	92	85	279	38
New York Americans	36	12	20	4	68	89	361	28
Toronto St. Patricks	36	12	21	3	92	114	325	27
Montreal Canadiens	36	11	24	1	79	108	458	23

Note: W = Wins, L = Losses, T = Ties, Pts = Points, GF = Goals for, GA = Goals against, PIM = Penalties in minutes
Note: Teams that qualified for the playoffs are highlighted in bold.

=== Record vs. opponents ===
1925–26 NHL Records
Team	BOS	MTL	MTM	NYA	OTT	PIT	TOR
Boston	—	2–3–1	4–1–1	2–2–2	2–4	2–4	5–1
M. Canadiens	3–2–1	—	1–5	2–4	0–6	2–4	3–3
M. Maroons	1–4–1	5–1	—	4–1–1	1–2–3	3–3	6–0
New York	2–2–2	4–2	1–4–1	—	1–5	3–3	1–1–4
Ottawa	4–2	6–0	2–1–3	5–1	—	4–2	3–1–2
Pittsburgh	4–2	4–2	3–3	3–3	2–4	—	3–2–1
Toronto	1–5	3–3	0–6	1–1–4	1–3–2	2–3–1	—

== Schedule and results ==
1925–26 regular season
November: 1–0–0 (home: 1–0–0; road: 0–0–0)

Game	Date	Visitor	Score	Home	OT	Decision	Attendance	Arena	Record	Pts
1	November 28	Maroons	2–3	Ottawa		Connell	N/A	Ottawa Auditorium	1–0–0	2

December: 8–1–0 (home: 5–0–0; road: 3–1–0)

Game	Date	Visitor	Score	Home	OT	Decision	Attendance	Arena	Record	Pts
2	December 2	Boston	0–2	Ottawa		Connell	N/A	Ottawa Auditorium	2–0–0	4
3	December 5	Pittsburgh	0–1	Ottawa		Connell	N/A	Ottawa Auditorium	3–0–0	6
4	December 10	New York	0–3	Ottawa		Connell	N/A	Ottawa Auditorium	4–0–0	8
5	December 12	Ottawa	2–5	Maroons		Connell	N/A	Montreal Forum	4–1–0	8
6	December 15	Ottawa	2–1	Boston		Connell	N/A	Boston Arena	5–1–0	10
7	December 17	Canadiens	0–3	Ottawa		Connell	N/A	Ottawa Auditorium	6–1–0	12
8	December 23	Toronto	2–4	Ottawa		Connell	N/A	Ottawa Auditorium	7–1–0	14
9	December 26	Ottawa	3–0	Canadiens		Connell	N/A	Mount Royal Arena	8–1–0	16
10	December 30	Ottawa	5–0	Pittsburgh		Connell	N/A	Duquesne Garden	9–1–0	18

January: 8–1–1 (home: 4–0–0; road: 4–1–1)

Game	Date	Visitor	Score	Home	OT	Decision	Attendance	Arena	Record	Pts
11	January 1	Ottawa	0–3	Toronto		Connell	N/A	Arena Gardens	9–2–0	18
12	January 5	Maroons	0–4	Ottawa		Connell	N/A	Ottawa Auditorium	10–2–0	20
13	January 7	Ottawa	1–1	Maroons	OT	Connell	N/A	Montreal Forum	10–2–1	21
14	January 11	Ottawa	1–0	New York	OT	Connell	N/A	Madison Square Garden	11–2–1	23
15	January 13	Pittsburgh	0–1	Ottawa		Connell	N/A	Ottawa Auditorium	12–2–1	25
16	January 19	Ottawa	2–1	Canadiens		Connell	N/A	Mount Royal Arena	13–2–1	27
17	January 21	New York	2–3	Ottawa		Connell	N/A	Ottawa Auditorium	14–2–1	29
18	January 26	Ottawa	8–2	Boston		Connell	N/A	Boston Arena	15–2–1	31
19	January 28	Canadiens	2–4	Ottawa		Connell	N/A	Ottawa Auditorium	16–2–1	33
20	January 31	Ottawa	1–0	New York		Connell	N/A	Madison Square Garden	17–2–1	35

February: 4–3–2 (home: 3–1–1; road: 1–2–1)

Game	Date	Visitor	Score	Home	OT	Decision	Attendance	Arena	Record	Pts
21	February 2	Ottawa	0–1	Pittsburgh		Connell	N/A	Duquesne Garden	17–3–1	35
22	February 4	Boston	3–2	Ottawa		Connell	N/A	Ottawa Auditorium	17–4–1	35
23	February 6	Ottawa	1–4	Toronto		Connell	N/A	Duquesne Garden	17–5–1	35
24	February 11	Toronto	1–2	Ottawa		Connell	N/A	Ottawa Auditorium	18–5–1	37
25	February 16	Ottawa	1–0	Canadiens		Connell	N/A	Mount Royal Arena	19–5–1	39
26	February 18	Canadiens	2–4	Ottawa		Connell	N/A	Ottawa Auditorium	20–5–1	41
27	February 20	Maroons	0–0	Ottawa	OT	Connell	N/A	Ottawa Auditorium	20–5–2	42
28	February 23	Ottawa	1–1	Maroons	OT	Connell	N/A	Montreal Forum	20–5–3	43
29	February 27	Boston	2–3	Ottawa		Connell	N/A	Ottawa Auditorium	21–5–3	45

March: 3–3–1 (home: 2–1–0; road: 1–2–1)

Game	Date	Visitor	Score	Home	OT	Decision	Attendance	Arena	Record	Pts
30	March 2	New York	3–2	Ottawa		Connell	N/A	Ottawa Auditorium	21–6–3	45
31	March 4	Ottawa	1–0	New York		Connell	N/A	Madison Square Garden	22–6–3	47
32	March 6	Ottawa	0–1	Boston		Connell	N/A	Boston Arena	22–7–3	47
33	March 8	Pittsburgh	0–3	Ottawa		Connell	N/A	Ottawa Auditorium	23–7–3	49
34	March 13	Ottawa	1–1	Toronto	OT	Connell	N/A	Arena Gardens	23–7–4	50
35	March 15	Ottawa	0–2	Pittsburgh		Connell	N/A	Duquesne Garden	23–8–4	50
36	March 17	Toronto	0–4	Ottawa		Connell	N/A	Ottawa Auditorium	24–8–4	52

Legend: Win (2 points) Loss (0 points) Tie (1 point)

== Attendance ==
The Senators as a road team drew the best attendance in the NHL, but had only the third-highest attendance in Ottawa–the least populated city in the league. Tommy Shields wrote in the Ottawa Citizen wrote that locals took their winning team for granted, and that attendance also dropped when Ottawa secured an early playoff berth.

== Playoffs ==
=== Montreal Maroons 2, Ottawa Senators 1 ===
The Senators went against the Maroons in a two-game total-goals series for the NHL championship and lost two goals to one. The Maroons had Punch Broadbent and goaltender Clint Benedict, two former Senators stars in the lineup, who would figure prominently in the series.

By placing first, the Senators had a bye to the NHL Championship round against the second-place Maroons who had defeated the Pittsburgh Pirates. At home in the first game, the Maroons tied the Senators 1–1. Former Senator Punch Broadbent scored at 8 minutes of the second period to put the Maroons ahead. The lead lasted until King Clancy tied the game with ten seconds left. In the second game, held at Ottawa, the Maroons took the series with a 1–0 shutout victory to win the NHL championship. Babe Siebert on an individual rush, scored off his own rebound at the six-minute mark of the second period. Cy Denneny appeared to tie the score a minute later, but the play was off-side. The Maroons held off the attack of the Senators the rest of the way in front of a record attendance of 10,525.

Tommy Shields wrote in the Ottawa Citizen, that the failure in the 1926 playoffs was a result of their regulars played too much and were tired out, losing by one goal.

After the playoff, the Senators welcomed the Saskatoon Sheiks of the Western Canada Hockey League for a pair of exhibition games on April 1 and April 3. The series matched the two leagues' runner-up teams. The Senators won the first game, played under NHL rules 4–3. The second game was played under WHL rules and the Sheiks won 7–5. Former Ottawa player Frank Boucher was a guest player for the Senators. The Sheiks were on an exhibition tour and played in Montreal on April 4 against the Canadiens in a benefit game for Georges Vezina's family.

1926 Stanley Cup playoffs
NHL championship vs. (2) Montreal Maroons – Maroons win 2 goals to 1 goal

Game	Date	Visitor	Score	Home	OT	Decision	Attendance	Arena	Series
1	March 25	Ottawa	1–1	Montreal		Connell	N/A	Montreal Forum	1–1
2	March 27	Montreal	1–0	Ottawa		Connell	N/A	Ottawa Auditorium	1–2

Legend: Win Loss Tie

== Player statistics ==
=== Regular season ===
Scoring

Player	Pos	GP	G	A	Pts	PIM
Cy Denneny	LW	36	24	12	36	18
Hooley Smith	C/RW	28	16	9	25	53
Frank Nighbor	C	35	12	13	25	40
Georges Boucher	D	36	8	4	12	64
King Clancy	D	35	8	4	12	80
Hec Kilrea	LW	35	5	0	5	12
Ed Gorman	D	23	2	1	3	12
Frank Finnigan	RW	36	2	0	2	24
Alec Connell	G	36	0	0	0	0
Jack Duggan	LW	27	0	0	0	0
Leth Graham	LW	1	0	0	0	0
Alex Smith	D	36	0	0	0	36

Goaltending

Player	MIN	GP	W	L	T	GA	GAA	SO
Alec Connell	2251	36	24	8	4	42	1.12	15
Team:	2251	36	24	8	4	42	1.12	15

=== Playoffs ===
Scoring

Player	Pos	GP	G	A	Pts	PIM
King Clancy	D	2	1	0	1	4
Georges Boucher	D	2	0	0	0	10
Alec Connell	G	2	0	0	0	0
Cy Denneny	LW	2	0	0	0	4
Jack Duggan	LW	2	0	0	0	0
Frank Finnigan	RW	2	0	0	0	0
Ed Gorman	D	2	0	0	0	2
Hec Kilrea	LW	2	0	0	0	0
Frank Nighbor	C	2	0	0	0	2
Alex Smith	D	2	0	0	0	0
Hooley Smith	C/RW	2	0	0	0	14

Goaltending

Player	MIN	GP	W	L	GA	GAA	SO
Alec Connell	120	2	0	1	2	1.00	0
Team:	120	2	0	1	2	1.00	0

Note:

Pos = Position;GP = Games played; G = Goals; A = Assists; Pts = Points; PIM = Penalty minutes; +/- = Plus/minus; PPG = Power-play goals; SHG = Short-handed goals; GWG = Game-winning goals
Pos = Position;GP = Games played; Min, TOI = Minutes played; W = Wins; L = Losses; T,T/OT = Ties; OTL = Overtime losses; GA = Goals-against; GAA = Goals-against average; SO = Shutouts; SA = Shots against; SV = Shots saved;SV% = Save percentage;

== Awards and records ==
- Lady Byng Trophy – Frank Nighbor

== Transactions ==
The Senators were involved in the following transactions during the 1925–26 season.

=== Free agents signed ===
November 12, 1925	From Ottawa Rideaus (OCHL) Hec Kilrea
December 14, 1925	From Ottawa Canadians (OCHL) Jack Duggan
