= 1925–26 Pittsburgh Pirates (NHL) season =

National Hockey League team season

1925–26 Pittsburgh Pirates
- League: 3rd NHL
- 1925–26 record: 19–16–1
- Home record: 13–5–0
- Road record: 6–11–1
- Goals for: 82
- Goals against: 70

Team information
- Coach: Odie Cleghorn
- Captain: Lionel Conacher
- Arena: Duquesne Garden

Team leaders
- Goals: Hib Milks (14)
- Assists: Harold Darragh (7)
- Points: Hib Milks (19)
- Penalty minutes: Lionel Conacher (66)
- Wins: Roy Worters (18)
- Goals against average: Roy Worters (1.90)

The 1925–26 Pittsburgh Pirates season was the first season of the new Pirates ice hockey team in the National Hockey League (NHL). The club made the playoffs in its first season after placing third in the league. The Pirates lost in the playoffs to the eventual Stanley Cup champion Montreal Maroons.

== Off-season ==
In October, the team signed former Montreal Canadiens player Odie Cleghorn as their new playing coach.

== Regular season ==
=== Final standings ===
National Hockey League
Teams	GP	W	L	T	GF	GA	PIM	Pts
**Ottawa Senators**	36	24	8	4	77	42	341	52
**Montreal Maroons**	36	20	11	5	91	73	554	45
**Pittsburgh Pirates**	36	19	16	1	82	70	264	39
Boston Bruins	36	17	15	4	92	85	279	38
New York Americans	36	12	20	4	68	89	361	28
Toronto St. Patricks	36	12	21	3	92	114	325	27
Montreal Canadiens	36	11	24	1	79	108	458	23

Note: W = Wins, L = Losses, T = Ties, Pts = Points, GF = Goals for, GA = Goals against, PIM = Penalties in minutes
Note: Teams that qualified for the playoffs are highlighted in bold.

=== Record vs. opponents ===
1925–26 NHL Records
Team	BOS	MTL	MTM	NYA	OTT	PIT	TOR
Boston	—	2–3–1	4–1–1	2–2–2	2–4	2–4	5–1
M. Canadiens	3–2–1	—	1–5	2–4	0–6	2–4	3–3
M. Maroons	1–4–1	5–1	—	4–1–1	1–2–3	3–3	6–0
New York	2–2–2	4–2	1–4–1	—	1–5	3–3	1–1–4
Ottawa	4–2	6–0	2–1–3	5–1	—	4–2	3–1–2
Pittsburgh	4–2	4–2	3–3	3–3	2–4	—	3–2–1
Toronto	1–5	3–3	0–6	1–1–4	1–3–2	2–3–1	—

== Playoffs ==
The Pirates qualified for the playoffs and faced the Montreal Maroons in a two-game total goals series. In game one at Montreal, Montreal won 3–1. In game two, Pittsburgh tied 3–3 and Montreal won the series 6–4.

== Schedule and results ==
=== Regular season ===
1925–26 regular season
November

Game	Result	Date	Score	Opponent	Record
1	W	November 26, 1925	2–1	@ Boston Bruins (1925–26)	1–0–0
2	W	November 28, 1925	1–0	@ Montreal Canadiens (1925–26)	2–0–0

December

Game	Result	Date	Score	Opponent	Record
3	L	December 2, 1925	1–2 OT	New York Americans (1925–26)	2–1–0
4	L	December 5, 1925	0–1	@ Ottawa Senators (1925–26)	2–2–0
5	W	December 9, 1925	6–3	Toronto St. Patricks (1925–26)	3–2–0
6	W	December 11, 1925	5–3	Boston Bruins (1925–26)	4–2–0
7	L	December 16, 1925	2–4	Montreal Maroons (1925–26)	4–3–0
8	W	December 18, 1925	3–2	New York Americans (1925–26)	5–3–0
9	T	December 19, 1925	1–1 OT	@ Toronto St. Patricks (1925–26)	5–3–1
10	L	December 23, 1925	0–1 OT	@ Montreal Maroons (1925–26)	5–4–1
11	L	December 26, 1925	1–3	@ New York Americans (1925–26)	5–5–1
12	L	December 30, 1925	0–5	Ottawa Senators (1925–26)	5–6–1

January

Game	Result	Date	Score	Opponent	Record
13	L	January 1, 1926	1–2	Montreal Canadiens (1925–26)	5–7–1
14	L	January 5, 1926	0–3	@ Boston Bruins (1925–26)	5–8–1
15	L	January 13, 1926	0–1	@ Ottawa Senators (1925–26)	5–9–1
16	W	January 15, 1926	5–1	Boston Bruins (1925–26)	6–9–1
17	W	January 19, 1926	4–0	@ New York Americans (1925–26)	7–9–1
18	W	January 21, 1926	5–4	Toronto St. Patricks (1925–26)	8–9–1
19	L	January 23, 1926	1–4	@ Montreal Maroons (1925–26)	8–10–1
20	W	January 27, 1926	2–1 OT	Montreal Maroons (1925–26)	9–10–1
21	L	January 29, 1926	2–3	@ Toronto St. Patricks (1925–26)	9–11–1

February

Game	Result	Date	Score	Opponent	Record
22	W	February 2, 1926	1–0	Ottawa Senators (1925–26)	10–11–1
23	W	February 6, 1926	6–1	@ New York Americans (1925–26)	11–11–1
24	L	February 9, 1926	2–4	@ Montreal Canadiens (1925–26)	11–12–1
25	W	February 13, 1926	3–0	Montreal Canadiens (1925–26)	12–12–1
26	L	February 16, 1926	2–3 OT	@ Boston Bruins (1925–26)	12–13–1
27	L	February 19, 1926	2–3	New York Americans (1925–26)	12–14–1
28	L	February 20, 1926	1–3	@ Toronto St. Patricks (1925–26)	12–15–1
29	W	February 23, 1926	3–2	Montreal Canadiens (1925–26)	13–15–1
30	W	February 26, 1926	1–0	Montreal Maroons (1925–26)	14–15–1

March

Game	Result	Date	Score	Opponent	Record
31	W	March 2, 1926	4–0	@ Montreal Maroons (1925–26)	15–15–1
32	W	March 4, 1926	7–2	Toronto St. Patricks (1925–26)	16–15–1
33	L	March 8, 1926	0–3	@ Ottawa Senators (1925–26)	16–16–1
34	W	March 9, 1926	4–3	@ Montreal Canadiens (1925–26)	17–16–1
35	W	March 12, 1926	2–1 OT	Boston Bruins (1925–26)	18–16–1
36	W	March 15, 1926	2–0	Ottawa Senators (1925–26)	19–16–1

Legend: Win (2 points) Loss (0 points) Tie (1 point)

=== Playoffs ===
1926 Stanley Cup playoffs
Semifinals vs. (2) Montreal Maroons – Maroons win 6 goals to 4

Game	Result	Date	Score	Opponent	Series
1	L	March 20, 1926	1–3	Montreal Maroons	Maroons lead 3 goals to 1
1	T	March 23, 1926	3–3	@ Montreal Maroons	Maroons win 6 goals to 4

Legend: Win Loss Tie

== Player statistics ==
=== Regular season ===
Scoring

Player	Pos	GP	G	A	Pts	PIM
Hib Milks	LW/C	36	14	5	19	17
Duke McCurry	LW	36	13	4	17	32
Harold Darragh	LW	35	10	7	17	6
Lionel Conacher	D	33	9	4	13	64
Rodger Smith	D	36	9	1	10	22
Baldy Cotton	LW	33	7	1	8	22
Tex White	RW	35	7	1	8	22
Herb Drury	D/RW	33	6	2	8	40
Jesse Spring	D	32	5	0	5	23
Odie Cleghorn	RW/C	17	2	1	3	4
Louis Berlinguette	LW	30	0	0	0	8
Fred Lowrey	RW	16	0	0	0	2
Alf Skinner	RW	7	0	0	0	2
Roy Worters	G	35	0	0	0	0

Goaltending

Player	MIN	GP	W	L	T	GA	GAA	SO
Roy Worters	2145	35	18	16	1	68	1.90	7
Odie Cleghorn	60	1	1	0	0	2	2.00	0
Team:	2205	36	19	16	1	70	1.90	7

=== Playoffs ===
Scoring

Player	Pos	GP	G	A	Pts	PIM
Duke McCurry	LW	2	0	2	2	2
Jesse Spring	D	2	0	2	2	2
Baldy Cotton	LW	2	1	0	1	0
Harold Darragh	LW	2	1	0	1	0
Herb Drury	D/RW	2	1	0	1	0
Rodger Smith	D	2	1	0	1	0
Louis Berlinguette	LW	2	0	0	0	0
Odie Cleghorn	RW/C	1	0	0	0	0
Lionel Conacher	D	2	0	0	0	0
Fred Lowrey	RW	2	0	0	0	6
Hib Milks	LW/C	2	0	0	0	0
Roy Worters	G	2	0	0	0	0

Goaltending

Player	MIN	GP	W	L	GA	GAA	SO
Roy Worters	120	2	0	1	6	3.00	0
Team:	120	2	0	1	6	3.00	0

Note: GP = Games played; G = Goals; A = Assists; Pts = Points; +/- = Plus/minus; PIM = Penalty minutes; PPG=Power-play goals; SHG=Short-handed goals; GWG=Game-winning goals
MIN=Minutes played; W = Wins; L = Losses; T = Ties; GA = Goals against; GAA = Goals against average; SO = Shutouts;

== See also ==
- 1925–26 NHL season
