= Jack Duggan =

Jack Duggan may refer to:

- Jack Duggan (ice hockey), Canadian ice hockey player
- Jack Duggan (politician), member of the Queensland Legislative Assembly
- Jack Duggan (hurler), Irish hurler

== See also ==
- John Duggan (disambiguation)
