= Alphonse Lacroix =

American ice hockey player

- Born: October 21, 1897 Newton, Massachusetts, U.S.
- Died: April 12, 1973 (aged 75) Lewiston, Maine, U.S.
- Height: 5 ft 7 in (170 cm)
- Weight: 136 lb (62 kg; 9 st 10 lb)
- Position: Goaltender
- Caught: Left
- Played for: Montreal Canadiens
- National team: United States
- Playing career: 1917–1931

Medal record

Men's ice hockey

Representing the United States

Olympic Games
Silver medal – second place	1924 Chamonix	Team competition

Alphonse Albert Lacroix (October 21, 1897 – April 12, 1973), known as "Al" or "Frenchy", was an American ice hockey goaltender who is best known as a member of the silver medal-winning American ice hockey team at the 1924 Winter Olympics, and as the emergency goaltender who replaced Georges Vezina when he collapsed in a game in 1925.

== Career ==
Lacroix was born in Newton, Massachusetts, and began his hockey career playing for the high school team in 1914. By 1917 he began playing in the Boston city senior amateur league. He joined the Boston Athletic Association in 1919 and played for their hockey team in the city senior league and later the United States Amateur Hockey Association. He was selected to the United States Olympic team at the 1924 Winter Olympics, winning a silver medal.

In 1925 he was retained by the National Hockey League as an emergency goaltender, on hand to replace any of the clubs' goalies should they suffer serious injury. His only experience at the top professional level came in 1925 when he replaced the Montreal Canadiens' Georges Vezina.

Vézina was unknowingly suffering from tuberculosis. Running a fever of 102 °F and coughing up blood on the ice, Lacroix relieved Vézina at the start of the second period of the opening game of the 1925–26 Montreal Canadiens season against the Pittsburgh Pirates on November 28. By December 15 the Canadiens had signed Herb Rheaume as Vézina's permanent replacement. Lacroix would stay on with the Canadiens as a spare goaltender until 1927, but never played another game in the NHL.

Lacroix continued his career in the Can-Am League and the semi-pro North East Hockey League. He retired from hockey in 1931.

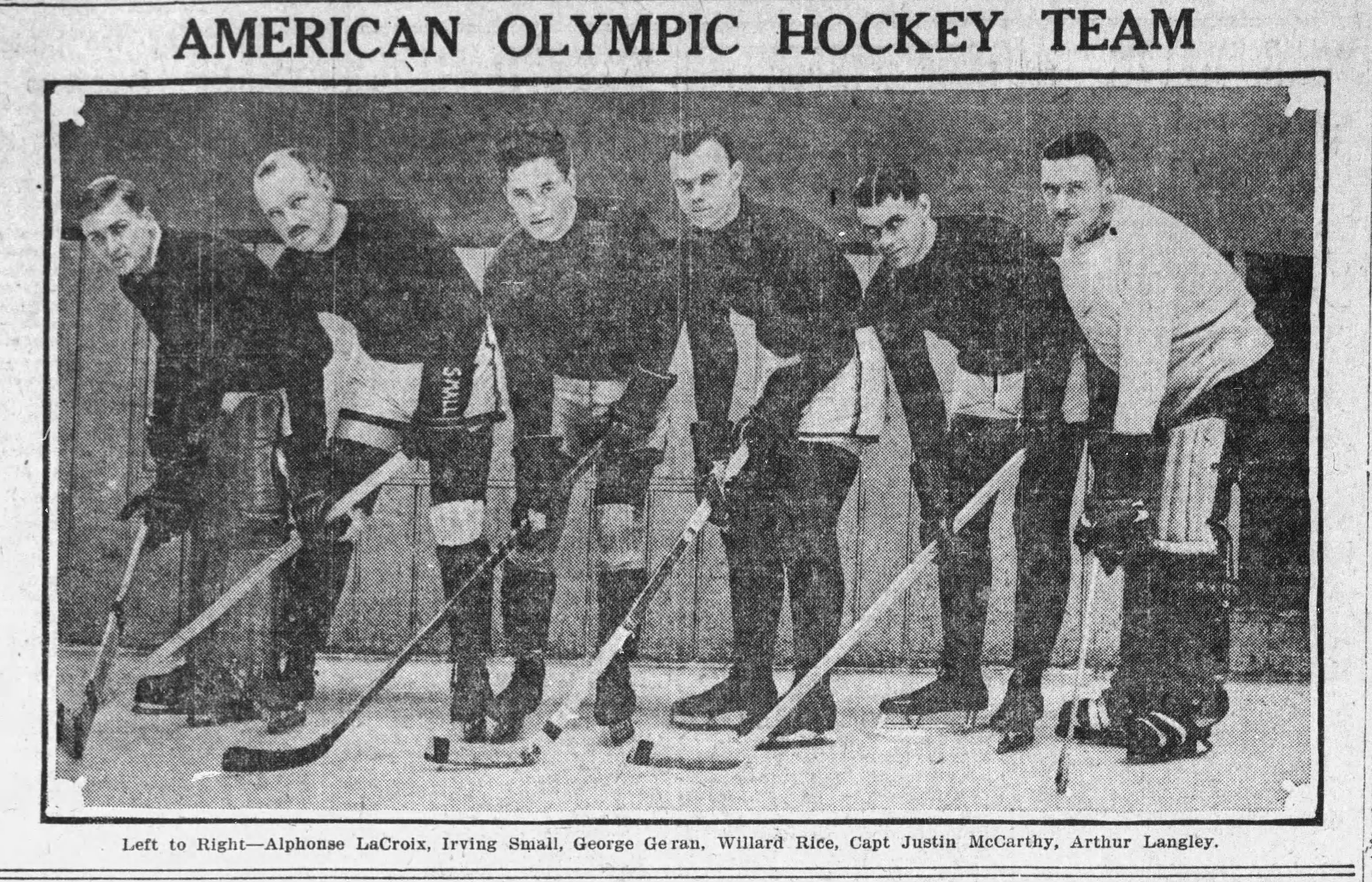
American Olympic Hockey Team for 1924 Winter Olympics, Boston Globe photograph, with LaCroix on the very left

He died in Lewiston, Maine.

== Career statistics ==
=== Regular season and playoffs ===
			Regular season								Playoffs
Season	Team	League	GP	W	L	T	Min	GA	SO	GAA	GP	W	L	Min	GA	SO	GAA
1914–15	Newton High School	HS-MA	7	5	1	1	294	15	0	2.04	1	1	0	40	1	0	1.00
1915–16	Newton High School	HS-MA	7	5	2	0	280	9	2	1.29	—	—	—	—	—	—	—
1916–17	Newton High School	HS-MA	8	7	0	1	320	10	4	1.25	—	—	—	—	—	—	—
1917–18	Boston Navy Yard	USNHL	11	7	4	0	455	22	3	1.93	—	—	—	—	—	—	—
1919–20	Boston A.A. Unicorns	Exhib	3	2	1	0	135	8	0	2.67	—	—	—	—	—	—	—
1920–21	Boston A.A. Unicorns	USAHA	—	—	—	—	—	—	—	—	—	—	—	—	—	—	—
1921–22	Boston A.A. Unicorns	USAHA	1	1	0	0	45	2	0	2.00	—	—	—	—	—	—	—
1922–23	Boston A.A. Unicorns	USAHA	9	9	0	0	405	10	4	1.11	4	3	1	180	4	1	1.00
1923–24	Boston A.A. Unicorns	USAHA	6	3	3	0	270	10	1	1.67	3	1	2	180	8	0	2.67
1924–25	Boston A.A. Unicorns	USAHA	21	15	6	0	955	40	4	1.88	4	1	3	150	10	1	3.00
1925–26	Montreal Canadiens	NHL	5	1	4	0	280	16	0	3.43	—	—	—	—	—	—	—
1927–28	Providence Reds	Can-Am	4	1	3	0	250	12	0	2.88	—	—	—	—	—	—	—
1927–28	Lewiston St. Doms	NEHL	22	8	12	2	1350	42	5	1.87	5	—	—	305	16	0	3.15
1928–29	Lewiston St. Doms	NEHL	4	3	1	0	240	9	0	2.25	3	2	1	240	8	1	2.67
1929–30	Providence Reds	Cam-Am	1	1	0	0	60	2	0	2.00	—	—	—	—	—	—	—
1930–31	Boston Tigers	Cam-Am	4	1	3	0	240	13	0	3.25	—	—	—	—	—	—	—
NHL totals			5	1	4	0	280	16	0	3.43	—	—	—	—	—	—	—

=== International ===
Year	Team	Event	GP	W	L	T	MIN	GA	SO	GAA
1924	United States	OLY	5	4	1	0	225	6	4	1.20
Senior totals			5	4	1	0	225	6	4	1.20
