= 1925–26 Toronto St. Patricks season =

National Hockey League team season

1925–26 Toronto St. Patricks
- League: 6th NHL
- 1925–26 record: 12–21–3
- Home record: 11–5–2
- Road record: 1–16–1
- Goals for: 92
- Goals against: 114

Team information
- General manager: Charles Querrie
- Coach: Eddie Powers
- Captain: Bert Corbeau
- Arena: Arena Gardens

Team leaders
- Goals: Jack Adams (21)
- Assists: Bert McCaffrey (9)
- Points: Jack Adams (29)
- Penalty minutes: Bert Corbeau (125)
- Wins: John Ross Roach (12)
- Goals against average: John Ross Roach (3.07)

The 1925–26 Toronto St. Patricks season was Toronto's ninth in the National Hockey League (NHL). The St. Pats slipped to sixth in the standings and missed the playoffs for the first time since the 1923–24 season.

== Offseason ==
The St. Patricks signed Gerry Munro formerly of the Montreal Maroons on defence.

== Regular season ==
=== Final standings ===
National Hockey League
Teams	GP	W	L	T	GF	GA	PIM	Pts
**Ottawa Senators**	36	24	8	4	77	42	341	52
**Montreal Maroons**	36	20	11	5	91	73	554	45
**Pittsburgh Pirates**	36	19	16	1	82	70	264	39
Boston Bruins	36	17	15	4	92	85	279	38
New York Americans	36	12	20	4	68	89	361	28
Toronto St. Patricks	36	12	21	3	92	114	325	27
Montreal Canadiens	36	11	24	1	79	108	458	23

Note: W = Wins, L = Losses, T = Ties, Pts = Points, GF = Goals for, GA = Goals against, PIM = Penalties in minutes
Note: Teams that qualified for the playoffs are highlighted in bold.

=== Record vs. opponents ===
1925–26 NHL Records
Team	BOS	MTL	MTM	NYA	OTT	PIT	TOR
Boston	—	2–3–1	4–1–1	2–2–2	2–4	2–4	5–1
M. Canadiens	3–2–1	—	1–5	2–4	0–6	2–4	3–3
M. Maroons	1–4–1	5–1	—	4–1–1	1–2–3	3–3	6–0
New York	2–2–2	4–2	1–4–1	—	1–5	3–3	1–1–4
Ottawa	4–2	6–0	2–1–3	5–1	—	4–2	3–1–2
Pittsburgh	4–2	4–2	3–3	3–3	2–4	—	3–2–1
Toronto	1–5	3–3	0–6	1–1–4	1–3–2	2–3–1	—

== Schedule and results ==
1925–26 regular season
November

Game	Result	Date	Score	Opponent	Record
1	L	November 28, 1925	2–3	Boston Bruins (1925–26)	0–1–0

December

Game	Result	Date	Score	Opponent	Record
2	L	December 1, 1925	2–4	@ Montreal Maroons (1925–26)	0–2–0
3	W	December 5, 1925	5–3	New York Americans (1925–26)	1–2–0
4	L	December 9, 1925	3–6	@ Pittsburgh Pirates (1925–26)	1–3–0
5	W	December 12, 1925	4–0	Montreal Canadiens (1925–26)	2–3–0
6	T	December 19, 1925	1–1 OT	Pittsburgh Pirates (1925–26)	2–3–1
7	L	December 23, 1925	2–4	@ Ottawa Senators (1925–26)	2–4–1
8	L	December 26, 1925	0–2	Montreal Maroons (1925–26)	2–5–1
9	L	December 29, 1925	0–3	@ Boston Bruins (1925–26)	2–6–1
10	L	December 30, 1925	1–2 OT	@ New York Americans (1925–26)	2–7–1

January

Game	Result	Date	Score	Opponent	Record
11	W	January 1, 1926	3–0	Ottawa Senators (1925–26)	3–7–1
12	L	January 5, 1926	4–5	@ Montreal Canadiens (1925–26)	3–8–1
13	W	January 9, 1926	3–2	Boston Bruins (1925–26)	4–8–1
14	L	January 12, 1926	2–5	@ Montreal Maroons (1925–26)	4–9–1
15	W	January 15, 1926	4–3	New York Americans (1925–26)	5–9–1
16	L	January 21, 1926	4–5	@ Pittsburgh Pirates (1925–26)	5–10–1
17	W	January 23, 1926	6–2	Montreal Canadiens (1925–26)	6–10–1
18	L	January 26, 1926	3–6	@ Montreal Canadiens (1925–26)	6–11–1
19	W	January 29, 1926	3–2	Pittsburgh Pirates (1925–26)	7–11–1

February

Game	Result	Date	Score	Opponent	Record
20	L	February 2, 1926	2–3	@ Boston Bruins (1925–26)	7–12–1
21	T	February 3, 1926	1–1 OT	@ New York Americans (1925–26)	7–12–2
22	W	February 6, 1926	4–1	Ottawa Senators (1925–26)	8–12–2
23	L	February 9, 1926	3–5	Montreal Maroons (1925–26)	8–13–2
24	L	February 11, 1926	1–2	@ Ottawa Senators (1925–26)	8–14–2
25	L	February 13, 1926	4–7	Boston Bruins (1925–26)	8–15–2
26	W	February 16, 1926	3–2	@ New York Americans (1925–26)	9–15–2
27	L	February 18, 1926	2–5	@ Montreal Maroons (1925–26)	9–16–2
28	W	February 20, 1926	3–1	Pittsburgh Pirates (1925–26)	10–16–2
29	L	February 22, 1926	1–2 OT	@ Boston Bruins (1925–26)	10–17–2
30	L	February 27, 1926	3–4	Montreal Maroons (1925–26)	10–18–2

March

Game	Result	Date	Score	Opponent	Record
31	L	March 4, 1926	2–7	@ Pittsburgh Pirates (1925–26)	10–19–2
32	W	March 6, 1926	4–2	New York Americans (1925–26)	11–19–2
33	W	March 11, 1926	5–3	Montreal Canadiens (1925–26)	12–19–2
34	T	March 13, 1926	1–1 OT	Ottawa Senators (1925–26)	12–19–3
35	L	March 16, 1926	1–6	@ Montreal Canadiens (1925–26)	12–20–3
36	L	March 17, 1926	0–4	@ Ottawa Senators (1925–26)	12–21–3

Legend: Win (2 points) Loss (0 points) Tie (1 point)

== Player statistics ==
Regular season
Scoring

Player	Pos	GP	G	A	Pts	PIM
Jack Adams	C	36	21	5	26	52
Babe Dye	RW	31	18	5	23	26
Bert McCaffrey	RW/D	36	14	7	21	42
Pete Bellefeuille	RW	36	14	2	16	22
Hap Day	D	36	14	2	16	26
Bert Corbeau	D	36	5	5	10	121
Mike Neville	C	33	3	3	6	8
Normand Shay	D/RW	22	3	1	4	18
Francis Cain	D	23	0	0	0	8
Albert Holway	D	12	0	0	0	0
Gerry Munro	D	4	0	0	0	0
Reg Reid	LW	12	0	0	0	2
John Ross Roach	G	36	0	0	0	0
Rod Smylie	W	5	0	0	0	0
Gordon Spence	LW	3	0	0	0	0

Goaltending

Player	MIN	GP	W	L	T	GA	GAA	SO
John Ross Roach	2231	36	12	21	3	114	3.07	2
Team:	2231	36	12	21	3	114	3.07	2

Note:

Pos = Position;GP = Games played; G = Goals; A = Assists; Pts = Points; PIM = Penalty minutes; +/- = Plus/minus; PPG = Power-play goals; SHG = Short-handed goals; GWG = Game-winning goals
Pos = Position;GP = Games played; Min, TOI = Minutes played; W = Wins; L = Losses; T,T/OT = Ties; OTL = Overtime losses; GA = Goals-against; GAA = Goals-against average; SO = Shutouts; SA = Shots against; SV = Shots saved;SV% = Save percentage;

== Transactions ==
- September 21, 1925: Signed Free Agent Peter Bellefeuille
- October 23, 1925: Acquired Gerry Munro from the Montreal Maroons for cash
- November 24, 1925: Signed Free Agent Alvin Fisher
- December 31, 1925: Signed Free Agent Gordon Spence
- January 7, 1926: Claimed Francis Cain off Waivers from the Montreal Maroons
- January 12, 1926: Lost Toots Holway off Waivers to the Montreal Maroons
- January 14, 1926: Acquired Norm Shay from the Boston Bruins for cash
- April 16, 1926: Signed Free Agent Bill Carson

== See also ==
- 1925–26 NHL season
