= 1925–26 New York Americans season =

Season of ice hockey

1925–26 New York Americans
- League: 5th NHL
- 1925–26 record: 12–20–4
- Home record: 4–10–4
- Road record: 8–10–0
- Goals for: 68
- Goals against: 89

Team information
- General manager: Tommy Gorman
- Coach: Tommy Gorman
- Captain: Billy Burch
- Arena: Madison Square Garden

Team leaders
- Goals: Billy Burch (21)
- Assists: Shorty Green (5)
- Points: Billy Burch (24)
- Penalty minutes: Ken Randall (94)
- Wins: Jake Forbes (12)
- Goals against average: Jake Forbes (2.30)

The 1925–26 New York Americans season was the first season of the New York Americans ice hockey team of the National Hockey League. Despite having the roster of the previous season's top club, the Hamilton Tigers, the club finished in last place.

== Offseason ==
Bill Dwyer became a hockey team owner by purchasing the suspended Hamilton Tigers franchise and the rights to its players for $80,000. Dwyer got Tommy Gorman to be general manager and coach from the Ottawa Senators, where he had been part-owner. Dwyer was convinced to buy the team by Bill MacBeth, an old friend and writer for the New York Herald-Tribune. MacBeth was convinced that the sport was a cinch to be successful in New York.

The negotiations with Percy Thompson for the Hamilton players started in July and broke off in September after it was found out that Mickey Roach had retired and Billy Burch was under contract to coach in Pittsburgh, Pennsylvania. Gorman purchased Joe Simpson, Crutchy Morrison and Roy Rickey for $10,000 from the Edmonton Eskimos. Edmonton offered to sell the remaining players of the Eskimos, including Duke Keats and George Hainsworth for $45,000, but Gorman's counter-offer of $25,000 was rejected. When it became clear that the NHL was going to take back the Hamilton franchise, Thompson settled with Gorman for $75,000 on September 26, at the NHL meetings in New York. Burch would eventually sign with the Americans for the then-huge salary of $25,000 for three seasons.

The players still had to pay their $200 fines before being allowed to play. Calder added the condition that each player had to write a letter of apology. Some of the first letters of apology were not acceptable to Calder and he demanded and got the players to rewrite the letters. $300 of each player's salary was held back until the end of the season to ensure they would play every game.

On December 4, eleven days before the first home game of the season, Dwyer would be arrested for bootlegging. Dwyer would slip into the background and Thomas Duggan of Montreal was named chairman of the board, John Hammond of the Madison Square Garden was named club president and the club was promoted as "Tex Rickard's Americans", Tex Rickard being the owner of Madison Square Gardens.

== Pre-season ==
The Americans held their first-ever training camp at Niagara Falls, Ontario. Thomas Duggan spoke about worries of the "Americanization" of ice hockey, stating that he had been approached in prior years about forming a four-team American league, but had turned it down. He convinced the other promoters to join the NHL. Duggan stated that the Americans instead signed with the NHL for $15,000 for the franchise and $85,000 for the players.

== Regular season ==
The former Hamilton players moved to New York and most moved into Bill Dwyer's headquarters, the Forrest Hotel, on 49th street, a half-block from the Gardens. The Hotel was also the home of several gangsters such as Legs Diamond, Dutch Schultz and Owney Madden, and writer Damon Runyon. and the liquor and lifestyle would interfere with the team's on-ice play. Players would miss games due to drunkenness, although publicly the missed games would be attributed to injury. The Americans, although having the roster of the previous season's top team, would finish in last place. The highlight of the season was a four-game winning streak in February, three of the four games played on the road.

=== Final standings ===
National Hockey League
Teams	GP	W	L	T	GF	GA	PIM	Pts
**Ottawa Senators**	36	24	8	4	77	42	341	52
**Montreal Maroons**	36	20	11	5	91	73	554	45
**Pittsburgh Pirates**	36	19	16	1	82	70	264	39
Boston Bruins	36	17	15	4	92	85	279	38
New York Americans	36	12	20	4	68	89	361	28
Toronto St. Patricks	36	12	21	3	92	114	325	27
Montreal Canadiens	36	11	24	1	79	108	458	23

Note: W = Wins, L = Losses, T = Ties, Pts = Points, GF = Goals for, GA = Goals against, PIM = Penalties in minutes
Note: Teams that qualified for the playoffs are highlighted in bold.

=== Record vs. opponents ===
1925–26 NHL Records
Team	BOS	MTL	MTM	NYA	OTT	PIT	TOR
Boston	—	2–3–1	4–1–1	2–2–2	2–4	2–4	5–1
M. Canadiens	3–2–1	—	1–5	2–4	0–6	2–4	3–3
M. Maroons	1–4–1	5–1	—	4–1–1	1–2–3	3–3	6–0
New York	2–2–2	4–2	1–4–1	—	1–5	3–3	1–1–4
Ottawa	4–2	6–0	2–1–3	5–1	—	4–2	3–1–2
Pittsburgh	4–2	4–2	3–3	3–3	2–4	—	3–2–1
Toronto	1–5	3–3	0–6	1–1–4	1–3–2	2–3–1	—

== Schedule and results ==
1925–26 regular season
December

Game	Result	Date	Score	Opponent	Record
1	W	December 2, 1925	2–1 OT	@ Pittsburgh Pirates (1925–26)	1–0–0
2	L	December 5, 1925	3–5	@ Toronto St. Patricks (1925–26)	1–1–0
3	W	December 8, 1925	6–2	@ Montreal Canadiens (1925–26)	2–1–0
4	L	December 10, 1925	0–3	@ Ottawa Senators (1925–26)	2–2–0
5	L	December 15, 1925	1–3	Montreal Canadiens (1925–26)	2–3–0
6	L	December 18, 1925	2–3	@ Pittsburgh Pirates (1925–26)	2–4–0
7	L	December 19, 1925	1–4	Montreal Maroons (1925–26)	2–5–0
8	W	December 22, 1925	3–2	@ Boston Bruins (1925–26)	3–5–0
9	W	December 26, 1925	3–1	Pittsburgh Pirates (1925–26)	4–5–0
10	W	December 30, 1925	2–1 OT	Toronto St. Patricks (1925–26)	5–5–0

January

Game	Result	Date	Score	Opponent	Record
11	L	January 2, 1926	2–3 OT	@ Montreal Maroons (1925–26)	5–6–0
12	T	January 7, 1926	2–2 OT	Boston Bruins (1925–26)	5–6–1
13	W	January 9, 1926	2–1	@ Montreal Canadiens (1925–26)	6–6–1
14	L	January 11, 1926	0–1 OT	Ottawa Senators (1925–26)	6–7–1
15	L	January 13, 1926	1–2	Montreal Canadiens (1925–26)	6–8–1
16	L	January 15, 1926	3–4	@ Toronto St. Patricks (1925–26)	6–9–1
17	L	January 19, 1926	0–4	Pittsburgh Pirates (1925–26)	6–10–1
18	L	January 21, 1926	2–3	@ Ottawa Senators (1925–26)	6–11–1
19	T	January 23, 1926	2–2 OT	Boston Bruins (1925–26)	6–11–2
20	T	January 25, 1926	1–1 OT	Montreal Maroons (1925–26)	6–11–3
21	L	January 30, 1926	0–1	Ottawa Senators (1925–26)	6–12–3

February

Game	Result	Date	Score	Opponent	Record
22	T	February 3, 1926	1–1 OT	Toronto St. Patricks (1925–26)	6–12–4
23	L	February 6, 1926	1–6	Pittsburgh Pirates (1925–26)	6–13–4
24	L	February 9, 1926	0–4	@ Boston Bruins (1925–26)	6–14–4
25	L	February 13, 1926	1–2	@ Montreal Maroons (1925–26)	6–15–4
26	L	February 16, 1926	2–3	Toronto St. Patricks (1925–26)	6–16–4
27	L	February 18, 1926	3–7	Boston Bruins (1925–26)	6–17–4
28	W	February 19, 1926	3–2	@ Pittsburgh Pirates (1925–26)	7–17–4
29	W	February 24, 1926	6–1	Montreal Canadiens (1925–26)	8–17–4
30	W	February 27, 1926	1–0	@ Montreal Canadiens (1925–26)	9–17–4

March

Game	Result	Date	Score	Opponent	Record
31	W	March 2, 1926	3–1	@ Ottawa Senators (1925–26)	10–17–4
32	L	March 4, 1926	0–1	Ottawa Senators (1925–26)	10–18–4
33	L	March 6, 1926	2–4	@ Toronto St. Patricks (1925–26)	10–19–4
34	W	March 9, 1926	1–0	@ Boston Bruins (1925–26)	11–19–4
35	L	March 11, 1926	1–5	@ Montreal Maroons (1925–26)	11–20–4
36	W	March 17, 1926	5–3	Montreal Maroons (1925–26)	12–20–4

Legend: Win (2 points) Loss (0 points) Tie (1 point)

== Player statistics ==
=== Regular season ===
Scoring

Player	GP	G	A	Pts	PIM
Billy Burch	36	22	3	25	33
Red Green	35	13	4	17	42
Charlie Langlois	36	9	1	10	76
Shorty Green	32	6	4	10	40
Alex McKinnon	35	5	3	8	34
Ken Randall	34	4	2	6	94
Edmond Bouchard	30	3	1	4	10
Joe Simpson	32	2	2	4	2
Mickey Roach	25	3	0	3	4
Earl Campbell	29	1	0	1	6
Rene Boileau	7	0	0	0	0
Billy Cameron	21	0	0	0	0
Jake Forbes	36	0	0	0	0
Bob Hall	8	0	0	0	0
Joe Ironstone	1	0	0	0	0
John Morrison	18	0	0	0	0

Goaltending

Player	MIN	GP	W	L	T	GA	GAA	SA	SV	SV%	SO
Jake Forbes	2240	36	12	20	4	86	2.30				2
Joe Ironstone	40	1	0	0	0	3	4.50				0
Team:	2280	36	12	20	4	89	2.34				2

== See also ==
- 1925–26 NHL season
