= 1925–26 Boston Bruins season =

NHL hockey team season

1925–26 Boston Bruins
- League: 4th NHL
- 1925–26 record: 17–15–4 (38 points)
- Home record: 10–7–1
- Road record: 7–8–3
- Goals for: 92
- Goals against: 85

Team information
- General manager: Art Ross
- Coach: Art Ross
- Captain: Sprague Cleghorn
- Arena: Boston Arena

Team leaders
- Goals: Carson Cooper (28)
- Assists: Jimmy Herbert, Sprague Cleghorn (5)
- Points: Carson Cooper, Jimmy Herbert (31)
- Penalty minutes: Jimmy Herbert (50)
- Wins: Doc Stewart (16)
- Goals against average: Charles Stewart (2.21)

The 1925–26 Boston Bruins season was the team's second season in the NHL. The Bruins finished fourth in the league standings, failing to make the playoffs.

== Regular season ==
Opening the season with a 2–1 loss to the expansion Pittsburgh Pirates, it looked initially as if the Bruins would turn in as poor a season as the year before, as they won only two of their first ten games, and after two consecutive wins, turned in an 0–5–3 record for most of January.

From a 5–0 shutout victory over the Maroons on January 30, however, the Bruins won 13 of their last 17 games, a 2–1 overtime loss to the Pirates on March 12 being the difference to lose out on a playoff berth to Pittsburgh by a single point. The winning percentage improvement of .328 from the previous season was an NHL record at the time, and remains the third best single season improvement ever.

A healthy Carson Cooper contributed to a near doubling of goals scored to lead the league, while the purchase of veteran star defenseman Sprague Cleghorn from the Montreal Maroons for $5000 solidified the defense – despite a knee injury in the opener against Pittsburgh that sidelined Cleghorn for a month – and saw goals allowed decline by over a third. Cooper and Jimmy "Sailor" Herbert finished second and third respectively in the league scoring race, behind Nels Stewart of the Maroons.

Among other debuts was that of goaltender Moe Roberts, at age 19 the second youngest player in the league and its first Jewish player. Roberts would wind up with one of the longest professional careers on record, playing his final game for the Chicago Black Hawks in 1951, the oldest player ever to play in the NHL, prior to Gordie Howe. He was the youngest player ever to play goal for twenty years, until surpassed by future Bruin Harry Lumley.

=== Final standings ===
National Hockey League
| Teams | GP | W | L | T | GF | GA | PIM | Pts |
|---|---|---|---|---|---|---|---|---|
| **Ottawa Senators** | 36 | 24 | 8 | 4 | 77 | 42 | 341 | 52 |
| **Montreal Maroons** | 36 | 20 | 11 | 5 | 91 | 73 | 554 | 45 |
| **Pittsburgh Pirates** | 36 | 19 | 16 | 1 | 82 | 70 | 264 | 39 |
| Boston Bruins | 36 | 17 | 15 | 4 | 92 | 85 | 279 | 38 |
| New York Americans | 36 | 12 | 20 | 4 | 68 | 89 | 361 | 28 |
| Toronto St. Patricks | 36 | 12 | 21 | 3 | 92 | 114 | 325 | 27 |
| Montreal Canadiens | 36 | 11 | 24 | 1 | 79 | 108 | 458 | 23 |

Note: W = Wins, L = Losses, T = Ties, Pts = Points, GF = Goals for, GA = Goals against, PIM = Penalties in minutes
Note: Teams that qualified for the playoffs are highlighted in bold.

=== Record vs. opponents ===
1925–26 NHL Records
| Team | BOS | MTL | MTM | NYA | OTT | PIT | TOR |
|---|---|---|---|---|---|---|---|
| Boston | — | 2–3–1 | 4–1–1 | 2–2–2 | 2–4 | 2–4 | 5–1 |
| M. Canadiens | 3–2–1 | — | 1–5 | 2–4 | 0–6 | 2–4 | 3–3 |
| M. Maroons | 1–4–1 | 5–1 | — | 4–1–1 | 1–2–3 | 3–3 | 6–0 |
| New York | 2–2–2 | 4–2 | 1–4–1 | — | 1–5 | 3–3 | 1–1–4 |
| Ottawa | 4–2 | 6–0 | 2–1–3 | 5–1 | — | 4–2 | 3–1–2 |
| Pittsburgh | 4–2 | 4–2 | 3–3 | 3–3 | 2–4 | — | 3–2–1 |
| Toronto | 1–5 | 3–3 | 0–6 | 1–1–4 | 1–3–2 | 2–3–1 | — |

== Schedule and results ==
1925–26 regular season
November

| Game | Result | Date | Score | Opponent | Record |
|---|---|---|---|---|---|
| 1 | L | November 26, 1925 | 1–2 | Pittsburgh Pirates (1925–26) | 0–1–0 |
| 2 | W | November 28, 1925 | 3–2 | @ Toronto St. Patricks (1925–26) | 1–1–0 |

December

| Game | Result | Date | Score | Opponent | Record |
|---|---|---|---|---|---|
| 3 | L | December 1, 1925 | 2–3 | Montreal Canadiens (1925–26) | 1–2–0 |
| 4 | L | December 3, 1925 | 0–2 | @ Ottawa Senators (1925–26) | 1–3–0 |
| 5 | L | December 5, 1925 | 0–4 | @ Montreal Maroons (1925–26) | 1–4–0 |
| 6 | W | December 8, 1925 | 3–2 | Montreal Maroons (1925–26) | 2–4–0 |
| 7 | L | December 11, 1925 | 3–5 | @ Pittsburgh Pirates (1925–26) | 2–5–0 |
| 8 | L | December 15, 1925 | 1–2 | Ottawa Senators (1925–26) | 2–6–0 |
| 9 | L | December 19, 1925 | 5–6 OT | @ Montreal Canadiens (1925–26) | 2–7–0 |
| 10 | L | December 22, 1925 | 2–3 | New York Americans (1925–26) | 2–8–0 |
| 11 | W | December 29, 1925 | 3–0 | Toronto St. Patricks (1925–26) | 3–8–0 |

January

| Game | Result | Date | Score | Opponent | Record |
|---|---|---|---|---|---|
| 12 | W | January 5, 1926 | 3–0 | Pittsburgh Pirates (1925–26) | 4–8–0 |
| 13 | T | January 7, 1926 | 2–2 OT | @ New York Americans (1925–26) | 4–8–1 |
| 14 | L | January 9, 1926 | 2–3 | @ Toronto St. Patricks (1925–26) | 4–9–1 |
| 15 | L | January 12, 1926 | 2–4 | Montreal Canadiens (1925–26) | 4–10–1 |
| 16 | L | January 15, 1926 | 1–5 | @ Pittsburgh Pirates (1925–26) | 4–11–1 |
| 17 | T | January 19, 1926 | 3–3 OT | Montreal Maroons (1925–26) | 4–11–2 |
| 18 | T | January 23, 1926 | 2–2 OT | @ New York Americans (1925–26) | 4–11–3 |
| 19 | L | January 26, 1926 | 2–8 | Ottawa Senators (1925–26) | 4–12–3 |
| 20 | W | January 30, 1926 | 5–0 | @ Montreal Maroons (1925–26) | 5–12–3 |

February

| Game | Result | Date | Score | Opponent | Record |
|---|---|---|---|---|---|
| 21 | W | February 2, 1926 | 3–2 | Toronto St. Patricks (1925–26) | 6–12–3 |
| 22 | W | February 4, 1926 | 3–2 | @ Ottawa Senators (1925–26) | 7–12–3 |
| 23 | T | February 6, 1926 | 3–3 OT | @ Montreal Canadiens (1925–26) | 7–12–4 |
| 24 | W | February 9, 1926 | 4–0 | New York Americans (1925–26) | 8–12–4 |
| 25 | W | February 13, 1926 | 7–4 | @ Toronto St. Patricks (1925–26) | 9–12–4 |
| 26 | W | February 16, 1926 | 3–2 OT | Pittsburgh Pirates (1925–26) | 10–12–4 |
| 27 | W | February 18, 1926 | 7–3 | @ New York Americans (1925–26) | 11–12–4 |
| 28 | W | February 20, 1926 | 3–1 | @ Montreal Canadiens (1925–26) | 12–12–4 |
| 29 | W | February 22, 1926 | 2–1 OT | Toronto St. Patricks (1925–26) | 13–12–4 |
| 30 | L | February 27, 1926 | 2–3 | @ Ottawa Senators (1925–26) | 13–13–4 |

March

| Game | Result | Date | Score | Opponent | Record |
|---|---|---|---|---|---|
| 31 | W | March 2, 1926 | 4–1 | Montreal Canadiens (1925–26) | 14–13–4 |
| 32 | W | March 4, 1926 | 3–2 | @ Montreal Maroons (1925–26) | 15–13–4 |
| 33 | W | March 6, 1926 | 1–0 | Ottawa Senators (1925–26) | 16–13–4 |
| 34 | L | March 9, 1926 | 0–1 | New York Americans (1925–26) | 16–14–4 |
| 35 | L | March 12, 1926 | 1–2 OT | @ Pittsburgh Pirates (1925–26) | 16–15–4 |
| 36 | W | March 16, 1926 | 1–0 | Montreal Maroons (1925–26) | 17–15–4 |

Legend: Win (2 points) Loss (0 points) Tie (1 point)

== Player statistics ==
=== Leading scorers ===
Note: GP = Games played; G = Goals; A = Assists; Pts = Points; PIM = Penalty minutes

| | Regular season | | | | | Playoffs |
| Player | GP | G | A | Pts | PIM | GP | G | A | Pts | PIM |
|---|---|---|---|---|---|---|---|---|---|---|
| Carson Cooper | 36 | 28 | 3 | 31 | 10 | – | – | – | – | – |
| Jimmy Herbert | 36 | 26 | 5 | 31 | 47 | – | – | – | – | – |
| Lionel Hitchman | 36 | 7 | 4 | 11 | 70 | – | – | – | – | – |
| Sprague Cleghorn | 25 | 6 | 5 | 11 | 49 | – | – | – | – | – |
| Hago Harrington | 26 | 7 | 2 | 9 | 6 | – | – | – | – | – |
| Red Stuart | 33 | 6 | 1 | 7 | 41 | – | – | – | – | – |
| George Geran | 33 | 5 | 1 | 6 | 6 | – | – | – | – | – |
| Stan Jackson | 28 | 3 | 3 | 6 | 30 | – | – | – | – | – |
| Herb Mitchell | 26 | 3 | 0 | 3 | 14 | – | – | – | – | – |
| Normand Shay | 13 | 2 | 0 | 2 | 2 | – | – | – | – | – |

=== Goaltenders ===
Note: GP = Games played; Min = Minutes; W = Wins; L = Losses; T = Ties; GA = Goals against; SO = Shutouts; GAA = Goals against average

| | Regular season | | | | | | | | Playoffs |
| Player | GP | Min | W | L | T | GA | SO | GAA | GP | Min | W | L | GA | SO | GAA |
|---|---|---|---|---|---|---|---|---|---|---|---|---|---|---|---|
| Doc Stewart | 35 | 2173 | 16 | 14 | 4 | 80 | 6 | 2.21 | – | – | – | – | – | – | – |
| Moe Roberts | 2 | 85 | 1 | 1 | 0 | 5 | 0 | 3.53 | – | – | – | – | – | – | – |

=== Transactions ===
- Purchased Sprague Cleghorn from the Montreal Maroons for $5,000.

== See also ==
- 1925–26 NHL season
