= Roland Paulhus =

Canadian ice hockey player

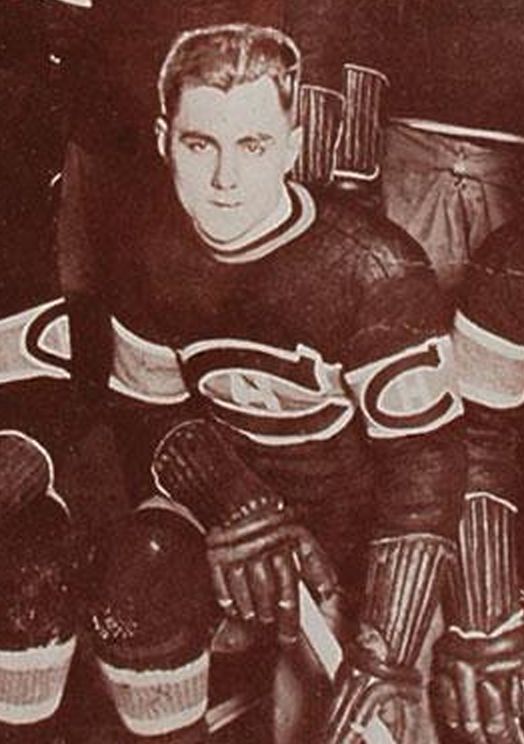
- Born: September 1, 1901; Sorel, Quebec, Canada
- Died: December 30, 1964 (aged 63); Alma Quebec, Canada
- Height: 5 ft 8 in (173 cm)
- Weight: 185 lb (84 kg; 13 st 3 lb)
- Position: Defence
- Shot: Left
- Played for: Montreal Canadiens
- Playing career: 1924–1932

Regis Emmanuel Roland "Rollie" Paulhus (September 1, 1901 – December 30, 1964) was a Canadian professional ice hockey defenceman. He played 33 games in the National Hockey League with the Montreal Canadiens during the 1925–26 season. The rest of his career, which lasted from 1924 to 1932, was spent in the minor leagues. He was born in Sorel, Quebec and died in 1964 of a heart attack.

== Career statistics ==
=== Regular season and playoffs ===
			Regular season					Playoffs
Season	Team	League	GP	G	A	Pts	PIM	GP	G	A	Pts	PIM
1924–25	Verdun Maple Leafs	MCHL	—	—	—	—	—	—	—	—	—	—
1925–26	Montreal Canadiens	NHL	33	0	0	0	0	—	—	—	—	—
1926–27	Providence Reds	Can-Am	29	5	3	8	74	—	—	—	—	—
1927–28	Providence Reds	Can-Am	39	15	3	18	76	—	—	—	—	—
1928–29	Providence Reds	Can-Am	38	5	2	7	108	2	0	0	0	2
1929–30	Providence Reds	Can-Am	8	0	0	0	6	—	—	—	—	—
1929–30	New Haven Eagles	Can-Am	10	0	1	1	20	—	—	—	—	—
1929–30	London Panthers	IHL	2	0	0	0	0	—	—	—	—	—
1930–31	Philadelphia Arrows	Can-Am	29	0	3	3	63	—	—	—	—	—
1931–32	Philadelphia Arrows	Can-Am	22	1	1	2	26	—	—	—	—	—
1931–32	Cleveland Indians	IHL	8	0	0	0	2	—	—	—	—	—
Can-Am totals			175	26	13	39	373	2	0	0	0	0
NHL totals			33	0	0	0	0	—	—	—	—	—
