= John Duggan =

John Duggan may refer to:

- John Duggan (rugby, born 1929) (1929–2022), English former rugby union and rugby league footballer
- John Duggan (rugby union, born 1948), Irish former Leicester Tigers winger
- John Duggan (bishop) (1918–2000), Bishop of Tuam, Killala, and Achonry, 1970–1985
- Jack Duggan (politician) (1910–1993), Australian politician for Electoral district of Toowoomba West
- Johnny Duggan (jockey), on racehorse Gold and Black
- John Duggan, main character in the TV series Duggan
- John Duggan, character in the TV series The Thick of It
- Jack Duggan (ice hockey) (1897–1977), ice hockey player
- Jack Duggan (politician) (1910–1993), member of the Queensland Legislative Assembly
- John Duggan (political scientist) of the Duggan–Schwartz theorem

== See also ==
- John Dugan (disambiguation)
