= René Boileau (ice hockey) =

Canadian ice hockey player

- Born: May 18, 1904 Pointe-Claire, Quebec, Canada
- Died: June 9, 1969 (aged 65) Montreal, Quebec, Canada
- Height: 5 ft 10 in (178 cm)
- Weight: 160 lb (73 kg; 11 st 6 lb)
- Position: Centre
- Shot: Left
- Played for: New York Americans
- Playing career: 1926–1931

Joseph Lorenzo Lionel Boileau (May 18, 1904 – June 9, 1969), known as René Boileau, was a Canadian professional ice hockey player who played seven games in the National Hockey League (NHL) for the New York Americans during the 1925–26 season, and five seasons in various minor-professional leagues. As a publicity stunt, the Americans billed Boileau, a French Canadian, as "the first Native American in the NHL" and claimed his name was Rainy Drinkwater. René was the father of the former NHL hockey player, Marc Boileau.

== Playing career ==
Boileau, a 150 lb (68 kg) native of Pointe-Claire, Quebec, played his only season in the NHL in 1925–26. Prior to joining the Americans, he played three seasons of amateur hockey in Montreal. Americans manager Tommy Duggan was anxious to promote the first-year Americans and upon signing Boileau used him as part of a publicity stunt. The Americans official announcement on the signing promoted Boileau under the pseudonym "Rainy Drinkwater" and announced that the French-Canadian player was instead from the Caughnawaga Indian Reservation, and the first Native American to play in the NHL. The Canadian press took note of the promotion; former Toronto Star sports editor Milt Dunnell said that "He received more ink than Sitting Bull". He played only seven games with the Americans, scoring no points.

Boileau spent the next five seasons playing professional hockey with the Niagara Falls Cataracts of the Canadian Professional Hockey League, New Haven Eagles of the Canadian American Hockey League and St. Louis Flyers of the American Hockey Association. He then played two seasons of semi-professional hockey in Quebec teams before retiring in 1934. His son, Marc, played and coached in the NHL.

== Career statistics ==
=== Regular season and playoffs ===
			Regular season					Playoffs
Season	Team	League	GP	G	A	Pts	PIM	GP	G	A	Pts	PIM
1923–24	Point Claire Maple Leafs	MCHL	—	—	—	—	—	—	—	—	—	—
1924–25	Montreal K of C	MCHL	—	—	—	—	—	—	—	—	—	—
1925–26	Montreal Columbus Club	MCHL	4	0	0	0	0	—	—	—	—	—
1925–26	Montreal Bell Telephone	MRTHL	3	7	0	7	0	—	—	—	—	—
1925–26	New York Americans	NHL	7	0	0	0	0	—	—	—	—	—
1926–27	Niagara Falls Cataracts	Can-Pro	18	4	0	4	8	—	—	—	—	—
1927–28	New Haven Eagles	Can-Am	36	5	3	8	51	—	—	—	—	—
1928–29	St. Louis Flyers	AHA	36	4	0	4	28	—	—	—	—	—
1929–30	St. Louis Flyers	AHA	30	2	1	3	46	—	—	—	—	—
1930–31	St. Louis Flyers	AHA	37	3	0	3	43	—	—	—	—	—
1931–32	Trois-Rivieres Renards	ECHA	4	0	0	0	6	—	—	—	—	—
1933–34	Verdun Maple Leafs	MSHL	5	1	0	1	10	2	0	0	0	0
NHL totals			7	0	0	0	0	—	—	—	—	—
