= 1925–26 Montreal Maroons season =

National Hockey League team season

1925–26 Montreal Maroons
- Stanley Cup champions
- Prince of Wales Trophy winners
- O'Brien Trophy winners
- League: 2nd NHL
- 1925–26 record: 20–11–5 (45 points)
- Home record: 12–4–2
- Road record: 8–7–3
- Goals for: 91
- Goals against: 73

Team information
- Coach: Eddie Gerard
- Captain: Dunc Munro
- Arena: Montreal Forum

Team leaders
- Goals: Nels Stewart (34)
- Assists: Reg Noble (9)
- Points: Nels Stewart (42)
- Penalty minutes: Nels Stewart (119)
- Wins: Clint Benedict (20)
- Goals against average: Clint Benedict (1.91)

The 1925–26 Montreal Maroons season saw the team win their first Stanley Cup in only their second season.

== Regular season ==
Rookie Nels Stewart led the league in goals, with 34, and points, 42, to win the Art Ross Trophy as the league's leading scorer. His accomplishments also won him the Hart Trophy as the league's most valuable player.

=== Final standings ===
National Hockey League
Teams	GP	W	L	T	GF	GA	PIM	Pts
**Ottawa Senators**	36	24	8	4	77	42	341	52
**Montreal Maroons**	36	20	11	5	91	73	554	45
**Pittsburgh Pirates**	36	19	16	1	82	70	264	39
Boston Bruins	36	17	15	4	92	85	279	38
New York Americans	36	12	20	4	68	89	361	28
Toronto St. Patricks	36	12	21	3	92	114	325	27
Montreal Canadiens	36	11	24	1	79	108	458	23

Note: W = Wins, L = Losses, T = Ties, Pts = Points, GF = Goals for, GA = Goals against, PIM = Penalties in minutes
Note: Teams that qualified for the playoffs are highlighted in bold.

=== Record vs. opponents ===
1925–26 NHL Records
Team	BOS	MTL	MTM	NYA	OTT	PIT	TOR
Boston	—	2–3–1	4–1–1	2–2–2	2–4	2–4	5–1
M. Canadiens	3–2–1	—	1–5	2–4	0–6	2–4	3–3
M. Maroons	1–4–1	5–1	—	4–1–1	1–2–3	3–3	6–0
New York	2–2–2	4–2	1–4–1	—	1–5	3–3	1–1–4
Ottawa	4–2	6–0	2–1–3	5–1	—	4–2	3–1–2
Pittsburgh	4–2	4–2	3–3	3–3	2–4	—	3–2–1
Toronto	1–5	3–3	0–6	1–1–4	1–3–2	2–3–1	—

== Playoffs ==
The Maroons took on the first-year team Pittsburgh Pirates in a two-game, total-goals series. The Maroons won the first game 3–1 and tied the second to win the series six goals to four.

In the second round, the Maroons took on the first-place Ottawa Senators. At home in the first game, the Maroons tied the Senators 1–1. Former Senator Punch Broadbent scored at 8 minutes of the second period to put the Maroons ahead. The lead lasted until King Clancy tied the game with ten seconds left. In the second game, held at Ottawa, the Maroons took the series with a 1–0 shutout victory to win the NHL championship. Babe Siebert on an individual rush, scored off his own rebound at the six-minute mark of the second period. Cy Denneny appeared to tie the score a minute later, but the play was off-side. The Maroons held off the attack of the Senators the rest of the way in front of a record attendance of 10,525.

After the final game in Ottawa, an anonymous supporter gave a $1,000 cheque to team president James Strachan "to be divided up among the boys for their fighting victory."

=== Stanley Cup Finals ===
Nels Stewart was "Old Poison" to the Victoria Cougars, as he scored 6 goals in the 4 games and goaltender Clint Benedict shut out the westerners three times. All games were played at the Forum in Montreal.

== Schedule and results ==
=== Regular season ===
1925–26 regular season
November

Game	Result	Date	Score	Opponent	Record
1	L	November 28, 1925	2–3	@ Ottawa Senators (1925–26)	0–1–0

December

Game	Result	Date	Score	Opponent	Record
2	W	December 1, 1925	4–2	Toronto St. Patricks (1925–26)	1–1–0
3	W	December 3, 1925	3–2	@ Montreal Canadiens (1925–26)	2–1–0
4	W	December 5, 1925	4–0	Boston Bruins (1925–26)	3–1–0
5	L	December 8, 1925	2–3	@ Boston Bruins (1925–26)	3–2–0
6	W	December 12, 1925	5–2	Ottawa Senators (1925–26)	4–2–0
7	W	December 16, 1925	4–2	@ Pittsburgh Pirates (1925–26)	5–2–0
8	W	December 19, 1925	4–1	@ New York Americans (1925–26)	6–2–0
9	W	December 23, 1925	1–0 OT	Pittsburgh Pirates (1925–26)	7–2–0
10	W	December 26, 1925	2–0	@ Toronto St. Patricks (1925–26)	8–2–0
11	L	December 30, 1925	4–7	Montreal Canadiens (1925–26)	8–3–0

January

Game	Result	Date	Score	Opponent	Record
12	W	January 2, 1926	3–2 OT	New York Americans (1925–26)	9–3–0
13	L	January 5, 1926	0–4	@ Ottawa Senators (1925–26)	9–4–0
14	T	January 7, 1926	1–1 OT	Ottawa Senators (1925–26)	9–4–1
15	W	January 12, 1926	5–2	Toronto St. Patricks (1925–26)	10–4–1
16	W	January 16, 1926	1–0	Montreal Canadiens (1925–26)	11–4–1
17	T	January 19, 1926	3–3 OT	@ Boston Bruins (1925–26)	11–4–2
18	W	January 23, 1926	4–1	Pittsburgh Pirates (1925–26)	12–4–2
19	T	January 25, 1926	1–1 OT	@ New York Americans (1925–26)	12–4–3
20	L	January 27, 1926	1–2 OT	@ Pittsburgh Pirates (1925–26)	12–5–3
21	L	January 30, 1926	0–5	Boston Bruins (1925–26)	12–6–3

February

Game	Result	Date	Score	Opponent	Record
22	W	February 2, 1926	2–0	@ Montreal Canadiens (1925–26)	13–6–3
23	W	February 9, 1926	5–3	@ Toronto St. Patricks (1925–26)	14–6–3
24	W	February 13, 1926	2–1	New York Americans (1925–26)	15–6–3
25	W	February 18, 1926	5–2	Toronto St. Patricks (1925–26)	16–6–3
26	T	February 20, 1926	0–0 OT	@ Ottawa Senators (1925–26)	16–6–4
27	T	February 23, 1926	1–1 OT	Ottawa Senators (1925–26)	16–6–5
28	L	February 26, 1926	0–1	@ Pittsburgh Pirates (1925–26)	16–7–5
29	W	February 27, 1926	4–3	@ Toronto St. Patricks (1925–26)	17–7–5

March

Game	Result	Date	Score	Opponent	Record
30	L	March 2, 1926	0–4	Pittsburgh Pirates (1925–26)	17–8–5
31	L	March 4, 1926	2–3	Boston Bruins (1925–26)	17–9–5
32	W	March 6, 1926	4–3 OT	@ Montreal Canadiens (1925–26)	18–9–5
33	W	March 11, 1926	5–1	New York Americans (1925–26)	19–9–5
34	W	March 13, 1926	4–2	Montreal Canadiens (1925–26)	20–9–5
35	L	March 16, 1926	0–1	@ Boston Bruins (1925–26)	20–10–5
36	L	March 17, 1926	3–5	@ New York Americans (1925–26)	20–11–5

Legend: Win (2 points) Loss (0 points) Tie (1 point)

=== Playoffs ===
1926 Stanley Cup playoffs
Semifinals vs. (3) Pittsburgh Pirates – Maroons win 6 goals to 4 goals

Game	Result	Date	Score	Opponent	Series
1	W	March 20, 1926	3–1	@ Pittsburgh Pirates (1925–26)	1–0–0
2	T	March 23, 1926	3–3	Pittsburgh Pirates (1925–26)	1–0–1

NHL championship vs. (1) Ottawa Senators – Maroons win 2 goals to 1 goal

Game	Result	Date	Score	Opponent	Series
1	T	March 25, 1926	1–1	Ottawa Senators (1925–26)	0–0–1
2	W	March 27, 1926	1–0	@ Ottawa Senators (1925–26)	1–0–1

Stanley Cup Finals vs. Victoria Cougars – Maroons win 3–1

Game	Result	Date	Score	Opponent	Series
1	W	March 30, 1926	3–0	Victoria Cougars	1–0
2	W	April 1, 1926	3–0	Victoria Cougars	2–0
3	L	April 3, 1926	2–3	Victoria Cougars	2–1
4	W	April 6, 1926	2–0	Victoria Cougars	3–1

Legend: Win Loss Tie

== Player statistics ==
=== Scoring leaders ===
Note: GP = Games played; G = Goals; A = Assists; Pts = Points

Player	GP	G	A	Pts
Nels Stewart	36	34	8	42
Babe Siebert	35	16	8	24
Reg Noble	33	9	9	18
Punch Broadbent	36	12	5	17
Dunc Munro	33	4	6	10
Hobie Kitchen	30	5	2	7
Chuck Dinsmore	33	3	1	4
Merlyn Phillips	12	3	1	4
Frank Carson	16	2	1	3
Sammy Rothschild	33	2	1	3

=== Goaltenders ===
GP = Games played, GA = Goals against, SO = Shutouts, GAA = Goals against average

Player	GP	GA	SO	GAA
Clint Benedict	36	73	6	2.0

== Awards and records ==
- Nels Stewart – Art Ross Trophy, Hart Trophy
- O'Brien Cup – for 1925–26 NHL champion.
- Prince of Wales Trophy – for 1925–26 NHL playoff champion.

== See also ==
- 1925–26 NHL season
