= John Dugan =

John Dugan may refer to:

- John Dugan (actor), American actor
- John C. Dugan, Comptroller of the Currency for the United States Department of the Treasury
- John T. Dugan (1920–1994), American screenwriter
- John Dugan (soccer), retired American soccer player and coach

== See also ==
- John Duggan (disambiguation)
