= Rodger Smith =

Canadian ice hockey player

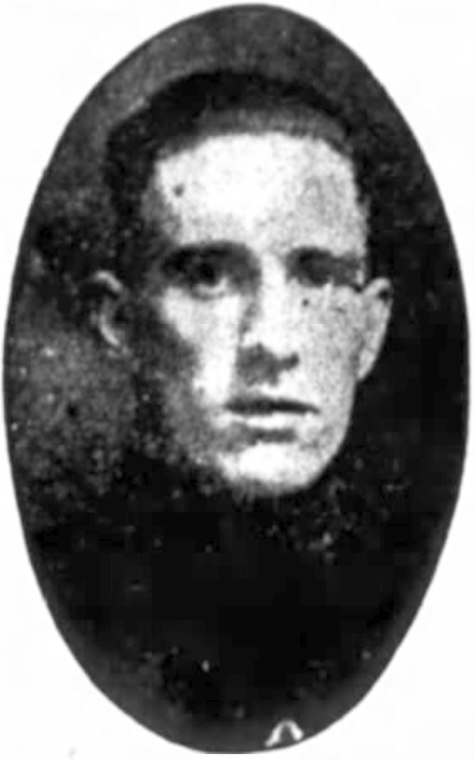
- Born: July 26, 1896; Ottawa, Ontario, Canada
- Died: January 31, 1935 (aged 38)
- Height: 6 ft 0 in (183 cm)
- Weight: 175 lb (79 kg; 12 st 7 lb)
- Position: Defence
- Shot: Left
- Played for: NHL; Pittsburgh Pirates; Philadelphia Quakers; IHL; Pittsburgh Yellow Jackets
- Playing career: 1922–1931

Denis Rodger Smith (July 26, 1896 – January 31, 1935) was a Canadian professional ice hockey defenceman who played six seasons in the National Hockey League for the Pittsburgh Pirates and Philadelphia Quakers between 1925 and 1931. He was born in Ottawa, Ontario.

== Career statistics ==
=== Regular season and playoffs ===
			Regular season					Playoffs
Season	Team	League	GP	G	A	Pts	PIM	GP	G	A	Pts	PIM
1918–19	Hamilton Tigers	OHA Sr	—	—	—	—	—	—	—	—	—	—
1919–20	Ottawa War Vets	OCHL	7	3	0	3	22	—	—	—	—	—
1920–21	Ottawa Gunners	OCHL	13	6	0	6	—	6	1	3	4	9
1921–22	Ottawa Gunners	OCHL	10	6	3	9	9	6	6	5	11	15
1922–23	Ottawa Gunners	OCHL	17	19	10	29	21	—	—	—	—	—
1923–24	Pittsburgh Yellow Jackets	USAHA	20	9	2	11	—	12	4	1	5	12
1924–25	Pittsburgh Yellow Jackets	USAHA	34	8	0	8	—	8	1	0	1	—
1925–26	Pittsburgh Pirates	NHL	36	9	1	10	22	2	1	0	1	0
1926–27	Pittsburgh Pirates	NHL	36	4	0	4	6	—	—	—	—	—
1927–28	Pittsburgh Pirates	NHL	43	1	0	1	30	2	2	0	2	0
1928–29	Pittsburgh Pirates	NHL	44	4	2	6	49	—	—	—	—	—
1929–30	Pittsburgh Pirates	NHL	42	2	1	3	65	—	—	—	—	—
1930–31	Philadelphia Quakers	NHL	9	0	0	0	0	—	—	—	—	—
1930–31	Pittsburgh Yellow Jackets	IHL	26	1	0	1	2	6	0	0	0	4
1930–31	Niagara Falls Cataracts	Can-Pro	12	0	0	0	0	—	—	—	—	—
1931–32	Chicoutimi Carabins	ECHL	23	6	10	16	36	3	0	0	0	2
NHL totals			210	20	4	24	172	4	3	0	3	0
