= Gerald Munro =

Canadian ice hockey player

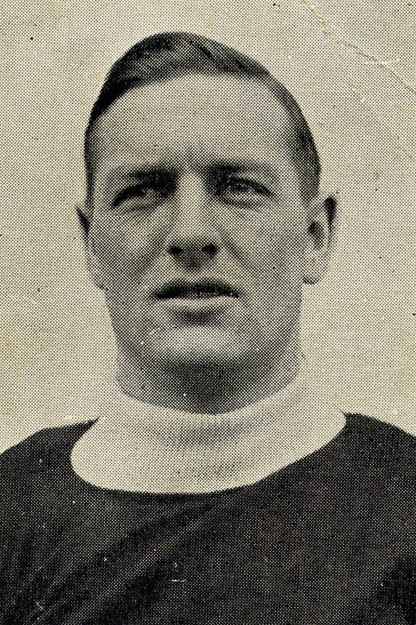
- Born: November 20, 1897; Sault Ste. Marie, Ontario, Canada
- Died: January 28, 1968 (aged 70); Sudbury, Ontario, Canada
- Height: 5 ft 10 in (178 cm)
- Weight: 175 lb (79 kg; 12 st 7 lb)
- Position: Defence
- Shot: Left
- Played for: Montreal Maroons; Toronto St. Pats
- Playing career: 1919–1931

Gerald John Morrison Munro (November 20, 1897 – January 28, 1968) was a Canadian ice hockey player who played two seasons in the National Hockey League for the Montreal Maroons and the Toronto St. Pats between 1924 and 1926. The rest of his career, which lasted from 1919 to 1931, was mainly spent in the amateur senior Northern Ontario Hockey Association and minor American Hockey Association.

== Personal life ==
Munro was born in Sault Ste. Marie, Ontario to William H. and Catherine Munro (nee Morrison). Munro's father was active in municipal politics, serving as the city's first mayor in 1912.

Munro married Florence M. Cameron in 1925 at Sault Ste. Marie, Michigan. He died in Sudbury, Ontario in 1968 and was buried at Park Lawn Cemetery. His wife, Florence died in 1958.

== Career statistics ==
=== Regular season and playoffs ===
			Regular season					Playoffs
Season	Team	League	GP	G	A	Pts	PIM	GP	G	A	Pts	PIM
1919–20	Sault Ste. Marie Greyhounds	NMHL	2	2	0	2	2	—	—	—	—	—
1919–20	Sault Ste. Marie Greyhounds	NOHA	3	5	1	6	2	—	—	—	—	—
1920–21	Sault Ste. Marie Greyhounds	NMHL	10	5	2	7	—	—	—	—	—	—
1920–21	Sault Ste. Marie Greyhounds	NOHA	4	2	0	2	4	5	5	1	6	—
1921–22	Sault Ste. Marie Greyhounds	NMHL	10	1	1	2	—	—	—	—	—	—
1921–22	Sault Ste. Marie Greyhounds	NOHA	7	0	1	1	11	2	0	0	0	2
1922–23	Sudbury Wolves	NOHA	8	3	1	4	10	2	0	0	0	4
1923–24	Sudbury Miners	NOHA	—	—	—	—	—	—	—	—	—	—
1924–25	Montreal Maroons	NHL	29	1	0	1	22	—	—	—	—	—
1925–26	Toronto St. Pats	NHL	4	0	0	0	0	—	—	—	—	—
1926–27	Winnipeg Maroons	AHA	20	2	2	4	24	—	—	—	—	—
1926–27	Detroit Greyhounds	AHA	5	1	0	1	2	—	—	—	—	—
1926–27	Chicago Cardinals	AHA	10	0	2	2	2	—	—	—	—	—
1927–28	Kansas City Pla-Mors	AHA	22	3	1	4	37	—	—	—	—	—
1928–29	Kansas City Pla-Mors	AHA	26	1	0	1	12	—	—	—	—	—
1929–30	Kansas City Pla-Mors	AHA	48	2	2	4	32	—	—	—	—	—
1920–31	Minneapolis Millers	AHA	42	5	5	10	53	—	—	—	—	—
AHA totals			173	14	13	27	162	—	—	—	—	—
NHL totals			33	1	0	1	22	—	—	—	—	—
