= Bill Taugher =

Canadian ice hockey player (1906–1943)

- Born: April 17, 1906
- Died: February 25, 1943 (aged 36)
- Position: Goaltender
- Played for: Hamilton Tigers; Buffalo Bisons; Rochester Cardinals
- Playing career: 1925–1936

William J. Taugher (April 17, 1906 – February 25, 1943) was a Canadian professional ice hockey goaltender. He played from 1925 until 1936, including with the Buffalo Bisons and Rochester Cardinals of the International Hockey League (IHL).

He then played two seasons with Hamilton Tigers of the CPHL and six seasons with Buffalo Bisons of the IHL. He helped the Bisons win two league titles. He suffered a serious head injury in 1931 after taking a puck to the face. He died at the age of 36 from a brain tumour.
