= Alex Currie =

Canadian ice hockey player-coach

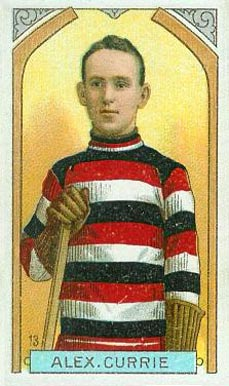
- Currie with the Ottawa Senators
- Born: December 12, 1891 Ottawa, Ontario, Canada
- Died: October 4, 1951 (aged 59) Ottawa, Ontario, Canada
- Height: 6 ft 0 in (183 cm)
- Weight: 180 lb (82 kg; 12 st 12 lb)
- Position: Right Wing
- Shot: Right
- Played for: Ottawa Primrose; Ottawa Emmetts; Ottawa Cliffsides; Haileybury Comets; Ottawa Senators; Quebec Bulldogs; Montreal Wanderers
- Playing career: 1907–1915

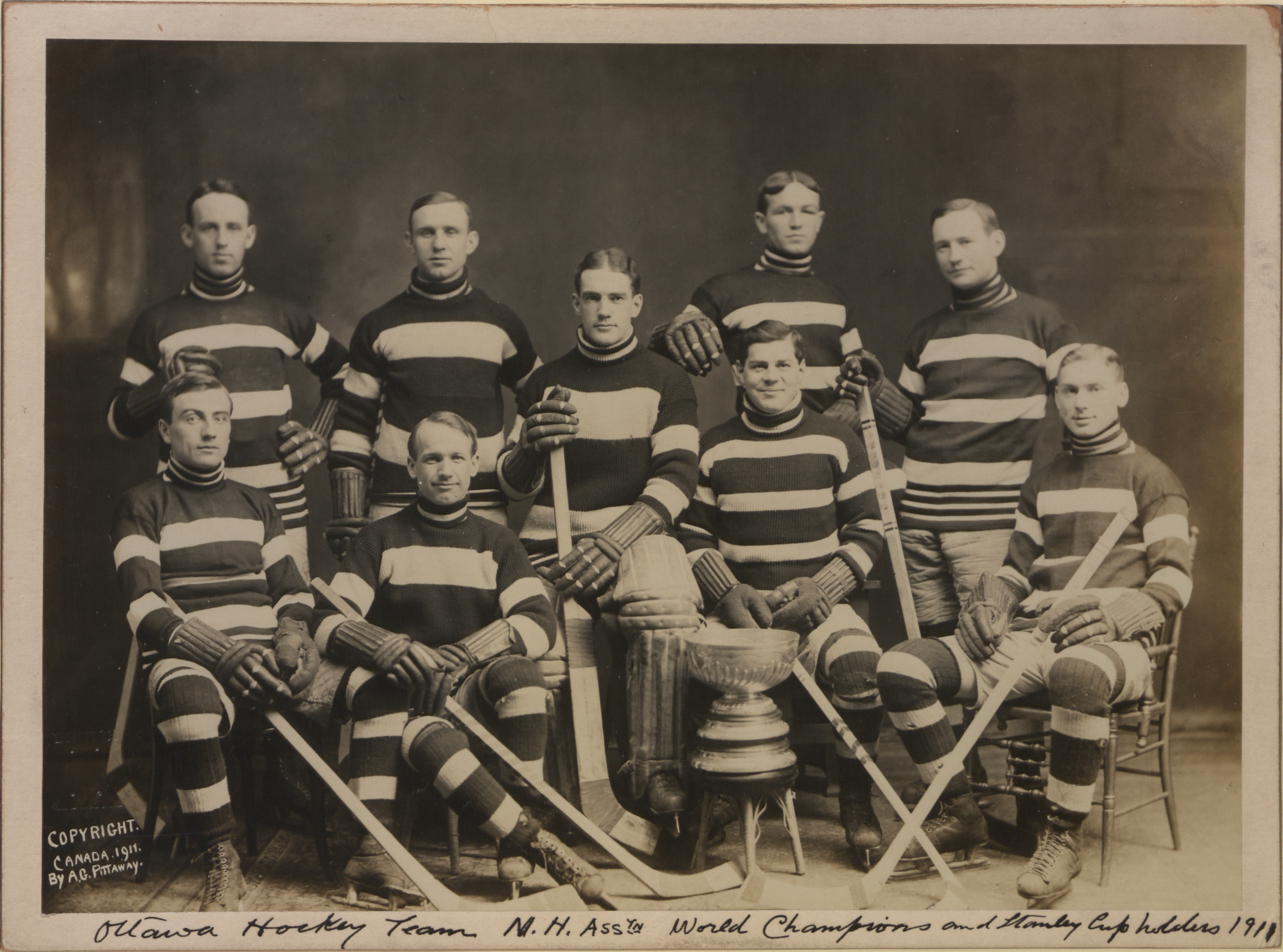
Currie, top left, with the Ottawa Senators and Stanley Cup in 1911.

Alexander John Currie (December 12, 1891 – October 4, 1951), was head coach of the original Ottawa Senators for the 1925–26 NHL season. As a player for the Senators, he won the Stanley Cup in the 1910–11 NHA season.

== Playing career ==
Born in Ottawa, Currie graduated to senior hockey with the Ottawa Primrose of the Ottawa City Hockey League in 1907, joining the Ottawa Emmetts in 1908 where he played on a forward line with Punch Broadbent and Gordon Roberts. After playing briefly with the Ottawa Cliffsides in the IPAHU, Currie joined the professional Haileybury Comets for their season in the National Hockey Association in 1909–10, for a sum of CA$600 ($17,109 in 2025 dollars), before returning to Ottawa to play for the Senators in their 1910–11 Stanley Cup championship season. He was loaned to the Quebec Bulldogs for one game that season. The following season, he did not play hockey.

Currie returned to the NHA in 1913 with the Montreal Wanderers for one season, and played one final season with Senators in 1914–15.

== Coaching career ==
Starting in 1914, Currie became coach of various teams in the Ottawa area, such as the Ottawa Aberdeens and Ottawa St. Pats. He coached in the National Hockey League (NHL) for the Ottawa Senators in the 1925–26 season.

== Personal life ==
Currie's parents were Mr. and Mrs. Francis Currie of Ottawa. He had a brother John W., and a sister, Mabel.

Currie was found drowned in the Ottawa River on October 18, 1951, after he had been missing for two weeks. Currie's body was recovered from the Ottawa River near Angers, Quebec, about 12 miles (19 km) down the river from Hull. Currie had been gravely ill for some months prior to his disappearance, and he was last seen alive after he dismissed a taxi cab on Booth Street in Ottawa on the afternoon of October 4.

Outside of ice hockey Currie was also a well-known lacrosse player, and as a golf player he was a member of the Rivermead Golf Club. He had worked as a siderographer for the Canadian Bank Note Company for some years.

He is buried at Beechwood Cemetery in Ottawa.

== Statistics ==
			Regular season					Playoffs
Season	Team	League	GP	G	A	Pts	PIM	GP	G	A	Pts	PIM
1910	Haileybury Comets	NHA	7	14	0	14	9	–	–	–	–	–
1910–11	Ottawa Senators	NHA	4	1	0	1	10	–	–	–	–	–
	Quebec Bulldogs	NHA	1	0	0	0	3	–	–	–	–	–
1911–12	Did not play
1912–13	Montreal Wanderers	NHA	4	1	0	1	2	–	–	–	–	–
1913–14	Ottawa Senators	NHA	3	0	0	0	0	–	–	–	–	–
NHA totalt			19	16	0	16	24	–	–	–	–	–

Statistics from sihrhockey.org

== Coaching record ==
=== National Hockey League ===
Team	Year	Regular season						Postseason
Team	Year	G	W	L	T	Pts	Division rank	Result
Ottawa Senators	1925-26	36	24	8	4	52	1st in NHL	Lost O'Brien Trophy (1-2 vs. MTM)
NHL totals		36	24	8	4	52		0-1-1 (0.250)

Preceded by Pete Green	Head Coach of the Ottawa Senators (Original); 1925–1926	Succeeded by Dave Gill
