= Hib Milks =

Canadian ice hockey player

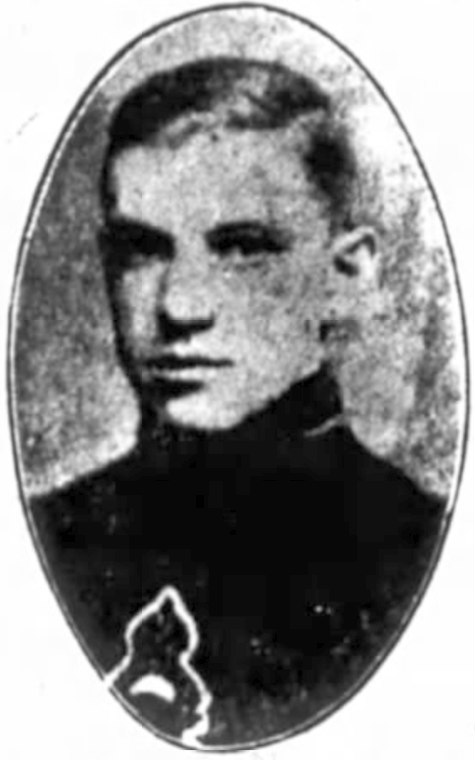
- Born: April 1, 1899; Eardley, Quebec, Canada
- Died: January 21, 1949 (aged 49); Shawville, Quebec, Canada
- Height: 5 ft 11 in (180 cm)
- Weight: 165 lb (75 kg; 11 st 11 lb)
- Position: Left wing/Centre
- Shot: Left
- Played for: Pittsburgh Pirates; Philadelphia Quakers; New York Rangers; Ottawa Senators
- Playing career: 1919–1933

Hibbert Henry "Hib" Milks (April 1, 1899 – January 21, 1949) was a Canadian professional ice hockey forward who played eight seasons in the National Hockey League with the Pittsburgh Pirates, Philadelphia Quakers, New York Rangers and Ottawa Senators between 1925 and 1933.

== Playing career ==
Milks recorded 87 goals and 41 assists for 128 points in 317 career regular season NHL games. The majority of his career was spent with the Pittsburgh Pirates. He died in 1949 at the age of 49. Milks was the only captain of the Philadelphia Quakers, a team whose NHL history consists of just one season (1930–31).

== Career statistics ==
=== Regular season and playoffs ===
			Regular season					Playoffs
Season	Team	League	GP	G	A	Pts	PIM	GP	G	A	Pts	PIM
1917–18	Ottawa Landsdownes	OCJHL	1	0	0	0	0	—	—	—	—	—
1918–19	Ottawa West-Enders	OCJHL	—	—	—	—	—	—	—	—	—	—
1919–20	Ottawa Gunners	OCHL	8	1	0	1	—	—	—	—	—	—
1920–21	Ottawa Gunners	OCHL	12	6	0	6	—	—	—	—	—	—
1920–21	Ottawa Gunners	Al-Cup	—	—	—	—	—	7	6	2	8	0
1921–22	Ottawa Gunners	OCHL	14	6	4	10	15	6	7	4	11	18
1922–23	Pittsburgh Yellow Jackets	USAHA	20	10	0	10	—	—	—	—	—	—
1923–24	Ottawa New Edinburghs	OCHL	12	16	0	16	—	2	0	0	0	—
1924–25	Pittsburgh Yellow Jackets	USAHA	39	12	0	12	—	8	2	0	2	0
1925–26	Pittsburgh Pirates	NHL	36	14	5	19	17	2	0	0	0	0
1926–27	Pittsburgh Pirates	NHL	44	16	6	22	18	—	—	—	—	—
1927–28	Pittsburgh Pirates	NHL	44	18	3	21	32	2	0	0	0	2
1928–29	Pittsburgh Pirates	NHL	44	9	3	12	22	—	—	—	—	—
1929–30	Pittsburgh Pirates	NHL	41	13	11	24	36	—	—	—	—	—
1930–31	Philadelphia Quakers	NHL	44	17	6	23	42	—	—	—	—	—
1931–32	New York Rangers	NHL	48	0	4	4	12	7	0	0	0	0
1932–33	Ottawa Senators	NHL	16	0	3	3	0	—	—	—	—	—
NHL totals			317	87	41	128	179	11	0	0	0	2

== Awards and achievements ==
- OCHL Second All-Star Team (1922)
