= Herb Rhéaume =

Canadian ice hockey player

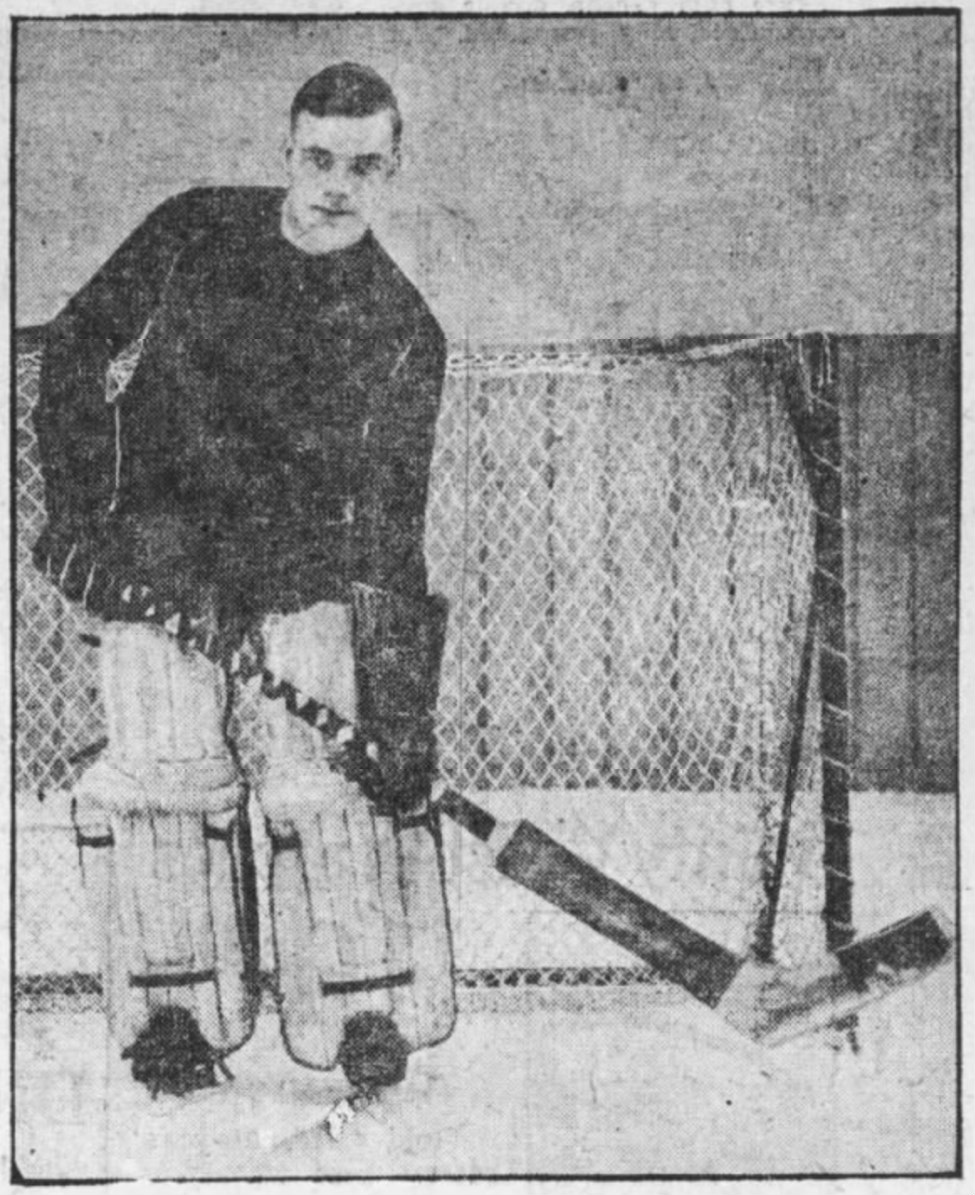
- Rhéaume with Westminster Hockey Club (USAHA) in 1921–22
- Born: January 12, 1900 Masson, Quebec, Canada
- Died: January 1, 1953 (aged 52) Vancouver, British Columbia, Canada
- Height: 6 ft 0 in (183 cm)
- Weight: 200 lb (91 kg; 14 st 4 lb)
- Position: Goaltender
- Caught: Left
- Played for: Montreal Canadiens
- Playing career: 1915–1936

Herbert Elbert Rhéaume (January 12, 1900 – January 1, 1953) was a Canadian professional ice hockey goaltender. He played 31 games in the National Hockey League for the Montreal Canadiens as an emergency replacement following Georges Vézina's death during the 1925–26 season. The following year, he was replaced by George Hainsworth. The rest of his career, which lasted from 1915 to 1936, was spent in the minor leagues. Rhéaume was born in Masson, Quebec and grew up in Ottawa, Ontario.

== Career statistics ==
=== Regular season and playoffs ===
			Regular season								Playoffs
Season	Team	League	GP	W	L	T	Min	GA	SO	GAA	GP	W	L	Min	GA	SO	GAA
1915–16	Ottawa Grand Trunk	OCHL	3	2	1	0	180	9	1	3.00	—	—	—	—	—	—	—
1916–17	Ottawa Grand Trunk	OCHL	8	2	5	1	480	22	1	2.75	—	—	—	—	—	—	—
1917–18	Hull Canadiens	OCHL	4	0	4	0	240	11	0	2.75	—	—	—	—	—	—	—
1917–18	Hull Canadiens	HOHL	5	—	—	—	300	10	0	2.00	—	—	—	—	—	—	—
1918–19	Hamilton Tigers	OHA Sr	8	6	2	0	480	35	0	4.38	4	2	2	240	13	0	3.25
1918–19	Hamilton Tigers	Al-Cup	—	—	—	—	—	—	—	—	2	1	1	130	6	0	2.77
1919–20	Hamilton Tigers	OHA Sr	6	5	1	0	360	17	0	2.83	—	—	—	—	—	—	—
1920–21	Hamilton Tigers	OHA Sr	9	3	6	0	540	39	0	4.33	—	—	—	—	—	—	—
1921–22	Westminster Hockey Club	USAHA	—	—	—	—	—	—	—	—	—	—	—	—	—	—	—
1922–23	Westminster Hockey Club	USAHA	—	—	—	—	—	—	—	—	—	—	—	—	—	—	—
1923–24	Trois-Rivières Renards	ECHA	2	1	1	0	120	1	1	0.50	—	—	—	—	—	—	—
1924–25	Quebec Sons of Ireland	ECHA	8	4	4	0	480	23	0	2.88	—	—	—	—	—	—	—
1925–26	Montreal Canadiens	NHL	31	10	20	1	1887	92	0	2.93	—	—	—	—	—	—	—
1926–27	Boston Tigers	Can-Am	32	14	15	3	1980	46	5	1.39	—	—	—	—	—	—	—
1927–28	Boston Tigers	Can-Am	40	21	14	5	2500	71	6	1.70	2	2	0	120	4	0	2.00
1928–29	Boston Tigers	Can-Am	40	21	15	4	2474	56	11	1.36	4	4	0	240	4	1	1.00
1929–30	Boston Tigers	Can-Am	40	17	18	5	2471	129	1	3.13	3	2	1	180	7	1	2.33
1930–31	St. Louis Flyers	AHA	34	10	21	3	2043	101	3	2.97	—	—	—	—	—	—	—
1931–32	St. Louis Flyers	AHA	35	13	14	8	2159	62	7	1.70	—	—	—	—	—	—	—
1932–33	Regina Capitals/Vancouver Maroons	WCHL	30	15	13	2	1800	102	0	3.40	2	0	1	120	8	0	4.00
1933–34	Portland Buckaroos	NWHL	34	—	—	—	2040	118	1	3.47	—	—	—	—	—	—	—
1934–35	Edmonton Eskimos	NWHL	21	—	—	—	1260	79	1	3.76	—	—	—	—	—	—	—
1935–36	Vancouver Lions	NWHL	10	7	1	2	630	20	2	1.91	7	3	4	430	19	1	2.65
NHL totals			31	10	20	1	1887	92	0	2.93	—	—	—	—	—	—	—
