= Herb Drury =

Canadian-born American ice hockey player (1896–1965)

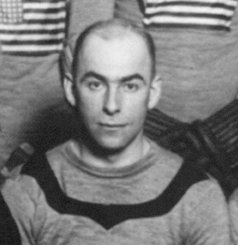
- Herb Drury with the 1920 USA Men's Olympic ice hockey team
- Born: March 2, 1896 Midland, Ontario, Canada
- Died: July 30, 1965 (aged 69) Pittsburgh, Pennsylvania, U.S.
- Height: 5 ft 7 in (170 cm)
- Weight: 165 lb (75 kg; 11 st 11 lb)
- Position: Defense
- Shot: Right
- Played for: Pittsburgh Yellow Jackets; Pittsburgh Pirates; Philadelphia Quakers
- National team: United States
- Playing career: 1916–1918; 1920–1931
Medal record
Men's ice hockey
Representing the United States
Olympic Games
Silver medal – second place	1920 Antwerp	Team competition
Silver medal – second place	1924 Chamonix	Team competition

Herbert Joseph Drury (March 2, 1896 – July 30, 1965) was a Canadian-born American ice hockey defenseman who played six seasons in the National Hockey League for the Pittsburgh Pirates and Philadelphia Quakers. Internationally he played for the American national team at the 1920 Summer Olympics and 1924 Winter Olympics, winning a silver medal both times.

== Playing career ==
Drury was Canadian, he was born in Midland, Ontario, on March 2, 1896. He moved to Pittsburgh in 1916 to play for the Pittsburgh Athletic Association hockey team (which later became the Pittsburgh Yellow Jackets of the United States Amateur Hockey Association) at the Duquesne Garden. From 1918 to 1919, he was called to military service for World War I, but was back to playing by the start of the 1919–20 season. That season, he represented the United States as a naturalized citizen on the U.S. Olympic hockey team for the 1920 Summer Olympics. The 1920 Olympic Games, in Antwerp, Belgium, was the debut of hockey to the Olympics, which was added to the existing summer sports. Although the U.S. lost to Canada's Winnipeg Falcons in the finals, Drury returned to the Pittsburgh Yellow Jackets as a silver medalist.

In 1924, Drury once again saw Olympic action as a member of the U.S. Olympic team that played in the first Winter Games at Chamonix, France. As part of the opening ceremonies, Drury carried the U.S. flag for his adopted country. During the games, Drury recorded an astounding 22 goals along with 3 assists, for a total of 25 points in the tournament. After defeating team Sweden 20–0, the U.S. settled for the silver medal following a 6–1 defeat to Canada. Drury scored the lone American goal during the gold medal game.

In October 1925, when Drury became the fifth former Yellow Jackets player sign with the National Hockey League's Pittsburgh Pirates. He played with the Pirates during all of the franchise's five seasons. In 1930, Drury relocated with the team to Philadelphia, where they were known as the Quakers. The Quakers franchise later suspended operations after the 1930–31 NHL season and later folded.

== Post-career ==
Following his retirement from professional hockey Drury became a steamfitter in Pittsburgh and lived there until his death. Drury died on July 30, 1965, aged 70, from undisclosed causes and was interred at Calvary Cemetery, Pittsburgh. In 2010, Herb Drury joined his late brother, University of Southern California football legend Morley Drury, as an inductee of the Midland (Ontario) Sports Hall of Fame, in the Athlete category. Drury's 1924 silver medal and scrapbook documenting his career, are currently on display at the Heinz History Center.

== Career statistics ==
=== Regular season and playoffs ===
			Regular season					Playoffs
Season	Team	League	GP	G	A	Pts	PIM	GP	G	A	Pts	PIM
1914–15	Midland Seniors	OHA Sr	1	2	0	2	—	—	—	—	—	—
1915–16	Port Colborne Seniors	OHA Sr	1	0	0	0	0	—	—	—	—	—
1916–17	St. Paul Saints	Exhib	—	—	—	—	—	—	—	—	—	—
1916–17	Pittsburgh AA	Exhib	6	0	1	1	6	—	—	—	—	—
1917–18	Pittsburgh AA	USNHL	12	10	0	10	—	—	—	—	—	—
1919–20	Pittsburgh AA	Exhib	—	—	—	—	—	—	—	—	—	—
1921–22	Pittsburgh Stars	USAHA	—	—	—	—	—	—	—	—	—	—
1922–23	Pittsburgh Yellow Jackets	USAHA	20	5	0	5	—	—	—	—	—	—
1923–24	Pittsburgh Yellow Jackets	USAHA	2	2	0	2	—	13	5	0	5	—
1924–25	Pittsburgh Yellow Jackets	USAHA	33	7	0	7	—	8	4	0	4	—
1925–26	Pittsburgh Pirates	NHL	33	6	2	8	40	2	1	0	1	0
1926–27	Pittsburgh Pirates	NHL	42	5	1	6	48	—	—	—	—	—
1927–28	Pittsburgh Pirates	NHL	44	6	4	10	44	2	0	1	1	0
1928–29	Pittsburgh Pirates	NHL	43	5	4	9	49	—	—	—	—	—
1929–30	Pittsburgh Pirates	NHL	27	2	0	2	12	—	—	—	—	—
1930–31	Philadelphia Quakers	NHL	24	0	2	2	10	—	—	—	—	—
NHL totals			213	24	13	37	203	4	1	1	2	0

=== International ===
Year	Team	Event	GP	G	A	Pts	PIM
1920	United States	OLY	3	6	0	6	0
1924	United States	OLY	5	22	3	25	0
Senior totals			8	28	3	31	0
