= Jack Duggan (ice hockey) =

Canadian ice hockey player

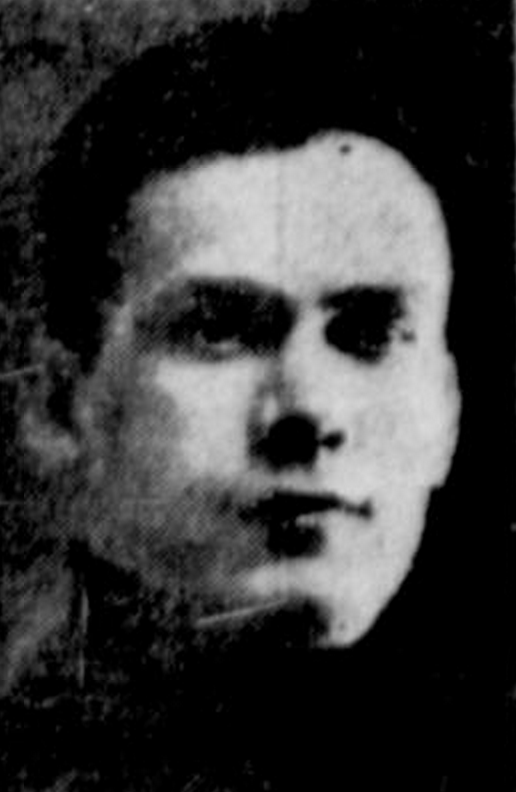
- Born: December 17, 1897; Ottawa, Ontario, Canada
- Died: February 3, 1977 (aged 79); Ottawa, Ontario, Canada
- Height: 5 ft 8 in (173 cm)
- Weight: 185 lb (84 kg; 13 st 3 lb)
- Position: Left wing
- Shot: Left
- Played for: Ottawa Senators
- Playing career: 1925–1929

John Herbert Duggan (December 17, 1897 – February 3, 1977) was a Canadian ice hockey player who played 27 games in the National Hockey League with the Ottawa Senators during the 1925–26 season. Born in Ottawa, Duggan had a lengthy career in the Ottawa City Hockey League before joining the NHL. He died at an Ottawa hospital in 1977 and is interred at Notre Dame Cemetery.

== Career statistics ==
=== Regular season and playoffs ===
			Regular season					Playoffs
Season	Team	League	GP	G	A	Pts	PIM	GP	G	A	Pts	PIM
1917–18	Ottawa St. Brigid	OCHL	16	9	0	9	9	—	—	—	—	—
1918–19	Ottawa Munitions	OCHL	7	3	1	4	3	—	—	—	—	—
1919–20	Ottawa Munitions	OCHL	8	8	0	8	—	5	5	5	10	—
1920–21	Ottawa Munitions	OCHL	8	8	0	8	—	1	0	1	1	0
1921–22	Ottawa Munitions	OCHL	13	8	6	14	6	—	—	—	—	—
1922–23	Ottawa St. Pats	OCHL	14	3	1	4	—	3	1	0	1	0
1922–23	Ottawa St. Pats	Al-Cup	—	—	—	—	—	7	4	0	4	2
1923–24	Ottawa Montagnards	OCHL	12	3	0	3	—	2	1	0	1	—
1923–24	Ottawa Montagnards	Al-Cup	—	—	—	—	—	4	2	1	3	—
1924–25	Ottawa Montagnards	OCHL	16	3	1	4	—	3	1	0	1	0
1924–25	Ottawa Montagnards	Al-Cup	—	—	—	—	—	4	0	1	1	8
1925–26	Ottawa Senators	NHL	27	0	0	0	0	2	0	0	0	0
1925–26	Ottawa Canadiens	OCHL	1	0	0	0	0	—	—	—	—	—
1926–27	London Panthers	Can-Pro	32	4	1	5	38	4	1	0	1	6
1927–28	London Panthers	Can-Pro	34	3	0	3	32	—	—	—	—	—
1928–29	Niagara Falls Cataracts	Can-Pro	42	2	1	5	53	—	—	—	—	—
Can-Pro totals			108	9	2	11	123	4	1	0	1	6
OCHL totals			95	45	9	54	—	14	8	6	14	—
NHL totals			27	0	0	0	0	2	0	0	0	0
