= Normand Shay =

Canadian ice hockey player (1899–1968)

Norman Shay
- Born: February 3, 1899 Huntsville, Ontario, Canada
- Died: November 28, 1968 (aged 69)
- Height: 5 ft 9 in (175 cm)
- Weight: 160 lb (73 kg; 11 st 6 lb)
- Position: Defence/Right Wing
- Shot: Left
- Played for: Boston Bruins; Toronto St. Patricks
- Playing career: 1921–1930

Norman Morse "Norm, Norman" Shay (February 3, 1899, in Huntsville, Ontario – November 28, 1968) was a Canadian ice hockey player who played two seasons in the National Hockey League for the Boston Bruins and the Toronto St. Pats between 1924 and 1926. The rest of his career, which lasted from 1921 to 1930, was spent in the United States Amateur Hockey Association and minor Canadian–American Hockey League.

== Career statistics ==
=== Regular season and playoffs ===
			Regular season					Playoffs
Season	Team	League	GP	G	A	Pts	PIM	GP	G	A	Pts	PIM
1920–21	Port Colborne Sailors	OHA Int	—	—	—	—	—	—	—	—	—	—
1921–22	Westminster Hockey Club	USAHA	—	—	—	—	—	4	1	0	0	—
1922–23	Westminster Hockey Club	USAHA	—	7	0	7	—	—	—	—	—	—
1923–24	New Haven Bears	USAHA	12	6	0	6	—	—	—	—	—	—
1924–25	Boston Bruins	NHL	18	1	2	3	14	—	—	—	—	—
1925–26	Boston Bruins	NHL	13	1	0	1	2	—	—	—	—	—
1925–26	Toronto St. Pats	NHL	22	3	1	4	18	—	—	—	—	—
1926–27	New Haven Eagles	Can-Am	22	4	2	6	48	4	0	0	0	2
1927–28	Philadelphia Arrows	Can-Am	7	1	0	1	14	—	—	—	—	—
1928–29	Philadelphia Arrows	Can-Am	3	0	0	0	0	5	2	0	2	2
1929–30	New Haven Eagles	Can-Am	40	6	3	9	59	—	—	—	—	—
Can-Am totals			72	11	5	16	121	4	0	0	0	2
NHL totals			53	5	3	8	34	—	—	—	—	—

== College Head Coaching Record ==
Record table
Season	Team	Overall	Conference	Standing	Postseason
Pennsylvania Quakers Independent (1928–1929)
1928–29	Pennsylvania	0–6–1 ^{†}			
Pennsylvania:		0–6–1			
Total:		0–6–1			
National champion Postseason invitational champion Conference regular season champion Conference regular season and conference tournament champion Division regular season champion Division regular season and conference tournament champion Conference tournament champion

† Shay was replaced part way through the season.
