= 1925–26 NHL season =

Professional ice hockey league season

- League: National Hockey League
- Sport: Ice hockey
- Duration: November 26, 1925 – March 27, 1926
- Games: 36
- Teams: 7

Regular season
- Season champions: Ottawa Senators
- Season MVP: Nels Stewart (Maroons)
- Top scorer: Nels Stewart (Maroons)

O'Brien Cup
- Champions: Montreal Maroons
- Runners-up: Ottawa Senators

NHL seasons
- ← 1924–25 1926–27 →

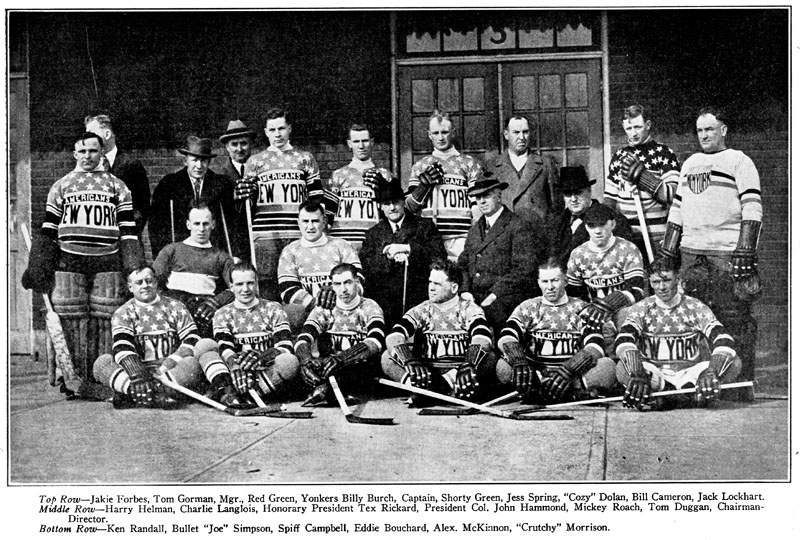
1925-26 New York Americans team (NHL)

The 1925–26 NHL season was the ninth season of the National Hockey League (NHL). The NHL dropped the Hamilton Tigers and added two new teams, the New York Americans and the Pittsburgh Pirates, to bring the total number of seven teams, playing a season of 36 games each. The Ottawa Senators were the regular-season champion, but lost in the NHL playoff final to the Montreal Maroons. The Maroons then defeated the defending Stanley Cup champion Victoria Cougars of the newly renamed Western Hockey League three games to one in a best-of-five series to win their first Stanley Cup.

== League business ==
A special meeting was held on September 22, 1925, to discuss expansion to New York City. The NHL approved the dropping of the Hamilton Tigers franchise and the adding of the New York Americans club, which would sign the Hamilton players after many had paid a reinstatement fee for their players strike the year before. The New York franchise was granted to Colonel J. S. Hammond and T. J. Duggan, although the ownership was held secretly by "Big Bill" Dwyer, an infamous bootlegger from New York City, to play in New York's Madison Square Garden. Former Ottawa executive Tommy Gorman, joined the Americans' organization.

At the annual meeting on November 7, 1925, the league added another new expansion franchise, in Pittsburgh, the third United States-based team in the NHL. The Ottawa Senators objected to the adding of the team, but were outvoted. The Pittsburgh team, known as the Pirates, was formed because former Toronto NHA owner Eddie Livingstone had been again threatening to form a rival league and mentioned Pittsburgh as one of the possible franchise locations. League president Frank Calder and the governors quickly agreed to grant the Pittsburgh Yellow Jackets organization an NHL franchise, known as the Pittsburgh Pirates, like the baseball club. Odie Cleghorn left the Canadiens to sign on as playing-coach with Pittsburgh.

Alex Currie, a former Ottawa Senators player in the old NHA, was hired to coach the team.

The league imposed a salary cap of $35,000 per team in an effort to curb player's salaries. The Pittsburgh Pirates' Lionel Conacher was paid $7,500 for the season, the Montreal Maroons' Dunc Munro was also paid $7,500, the New York Americans' Billy Burch was paid $6,500, the Americans' Joe Simpson, and the Toronto Maple Leafs' Hap Day were paid $6,000.

=== Rule changes ===
- Only two players on defence within the blue line at a time.
- A faceoff for 'ragging the puck' unless playing short-handed.
- Only team captains would be allowed to talk to referees.
- Timekeepers would signal the end of a period with a gong instead of the referee's whistle.
- Goalkeeper pads were limited to 12 inches (300 mm) wide.
- 14-player roster limits. Only 12 to be dressed for any one game.
- Team salary cap of $35,000.

== Arena changes ==
- The expansion New York Americans moved into the third building named Madison Square Garden.
- The expansion Pittsburgh Pirates moved into Duquesne Garden.

== Regular season ==
The Hamilton Tigers had spent their first five seasons in the NHL in last place until last season where they went from worst to first. The success enjoyed by the Tigers players was not carried over to New York, though, as the Americans finished fifth overall with a record of 12–20–4.

Eddie Gerard improved the Montreal Maroons by signing Nels Stewart and Babe Siebert and signing former Olympian Dunc Munro for defence. The Maroons were on their way to glory. Nels Stewart not only set a record for goals by a first-year player, but became the first rookie to win the scoring title. Stewart also won the Hart Trophy as league MVP. Stewart's record of 34 goals remains an NHL record for rookies until 1970–71.

From the 1910–11 season Georges Vezina had been the Montreal Canadiens goaltender, and had led them to the Cup in 1916 and 1924. In the first game of this season, he collapsed on the ice as the second period got underway. It was found he had tuberculosis, and he died in March 1926. The Canadiens finished last in the standings and missed the playoffs.

Ottawa's coach Curry was quite successful, as he took a team that had gone from fourth overall to first with an impressive record of 24–8–4, and the expansion Pittsburgh Pirates, with a strong cast of ex-amateurs led by future Hall of Famers Roy Worters and Lionel Conacher, finished third. The Pirates introduced "on-the-fly" player substitution to the NHL, a practice already in use in the Western League.

=== Highlights ===
First game at Madison Square Garden December 15, 1925

The first regular-season game at Madison Square Garden between the Montreal Canadiens and the expansion New York Americans was a big event. Opening ceremonies included performances by the Governor General's Body Guard Band of Toronto and the United States Military Band from West Point, displays of 'fancy skating', a miniature game between the team's mascots and the opening faceoff was made by New York Mayor John F. Hylan and Tex Rickard. The attendance was 19,000 and the ticket prices ranged from $1.50 to $11.50. Gate receipts were donated to the Neurological Society of New York. Montreal won the game, officiated by Cooper Smeaton 3–1, and were awarded the new Prince of Wales Trophy. (The Trophy would subsequently be given as an award to the NHL playoff champions.)

One innovation brought in was the painting of the ice white. After a half-inch of ice was frozen, it was painted white, and another inch of ice was frozen on top.

=== Final standings ===
National Hockey League
Teams	GP	W	L	T	GF	GA	PIM	Pts
**Ottawa Senators**	36	24	8	4	77	42	341	52
**Montreal Maroons**	36	20	11	5	91	73	554	45
**Pittsburgh Pirates**	36	19	16	1	82	70	264	39
Boston Bruins	36	17	15	4	92	85	279	38
New York Americans	36	12	20	4	68	89	361	28
Toronto St. Patricks	36	12	21	3	92	114	325	27
Montreal Canadiens	36	11	24	1	79	108	458	23

Note: W = Wins, L = Losses, T = Ties, Pts = Points, GF = Goals for, GA = Goals against, PIM = Penalties in minutes
Note: Teams that qualified for the playoffs are highlighted in bold.

== Playoffs ==
This is the last season that saw challengers from outside of the NHL compete for the Stanley Cup. At the beginning of the season, the Western Canada Hockey League (WCHL) renamed itself the Western Hockey League because one of its teams, the Regina Capitals, had moved to the States to play in Portland, Oregon. They were renamed the Portland Rosebuds.

Once again, the Victoria Cougars finished third in the WHL, and once again won their league championship and the right to play for the Stanley Cup. The previous season, the Cougars beat the Montreal Canadiens for the Stanley Cup with that being the only time in NHL history in which a non-NHL team won the Cup. After the 1926 playoffs, the Western Hockey League folded leaving the Stanley Cup entirely to the NHL. The Cup was never again contested by a non-NHL team. This was also the only season in NHL history where the number of playoff berths was less than half of the number of teams in the league and is the most recent season in which none of the Original Six qualified for the playoffs.

=== NHL championship ===
The top three teams in the league qualified for the O'Brien Cup playoffs. The second-place Montreal Maroons beat the third-place Pittsburgh Pirates in a two-game total-goals series, then went on to beat first-place Ottawa Senators in another two-game total-goals series to capture the O'Brien Cup and the newly introduced, redundant, Prince of Wales Trophy. As NHL champions, the Maroons moved on to play the WHL champion Victoria Cougars for the Stanley Cup.

March 20	Montreal Maroons	3–1	Pittsburgh Pirates	Duquesne Garden	Recap
No scoring		First period	16:21 - Rodger Smith (1)
Reg Noble (1) - 14:07		Second period	15:45 - Chuck Dinsmore (1)
No scoring		Third period	5:35 - Merlyn Phillips (1)
Clint Benedict		Goalie stats	Roy Worters

March 23	Pittsburgh Pirates	3–3	Montreal Maroons	Montreal Forum	Recap
No scoring		First period	5:40 - Merlyn Phillips (2); 16:20 - Punch Broadbent (1)
Harold Darragh (1) - 13:40		Second period	14:00 - Merlyn Phillips (3)
Herb Drury (1) - 8:50		Third period	14:04 - Baldy Cotton (1)
Roy Worters		Goalie stats	Clint Benedict

Montreal won the series on total goals 6–4

March 25	Ottawa Senators	1–1	Montreal Maroons	Montreal Forum	Recap
No scoring		First period	No scoring
No scoring		Second period	8:00 - pp - Punch Broadbent (2)
King Clancy (1) - sh - 19:50		Third period	No scoring
Alec Connell		Goalie stats	Clint Benedict

March 27	Montreal Maroons	1–0	Ottawa Senators	Ottawa Auditorium	Recap
Babe Siebert (1) - 5:45		First period	No scoring
No scoring		Second period	No scoring
No scoring		Third period	No scoring
Clint Benedict		Goalie stats	Alec Connell

Montreal won the series on total goals 2–1

=== Stanley Cup Finals ===
Nels Stewart was "Old Poison" to the Victoria Cougars, as he scored six goals in the four games and goaltender Clint Benedict shut out the westerners three times.

March 30	Victoria Cougars	0–3	Montreal Maroons	Montreal Forum	Recap
No scoring		First period	02:00 – Nels Stewart (1); 05:05 – Punch Broadbent (3)
No scoring		Second period	No scoring
No scoring		Third period	16:10 – Nels Stewart (2)
Hap Holmes		Goalie stats	Clint Benedict

April 1	Victoria Cougars	0–3	Montreal Maroons	Montreal Forum	Recap
No scoring		First period	10:10 – pp – Nels Stewart (3)
No scoring		Second period	09:40 – Merlyn Phillips (4)
No scoring		Third period	15:55 – pp – Dunc Munro (1)
Hap Holmes		Goalie stats	Clint Benedict

April 3	Victoria Cougars	3–2	Montreal Maroons	Montreal Forum	Recap
Harold Halderson (1) – 16:15		First period	03:02 – Babe Siebert (2)
Clem Loughlin (1) – 10:05		Second period	No scoring
Frank Fredrickson (1) – 07:50		Third period	16:15 – Nels Stewart (4)
Hap Holmes		Goalie stats	Clint Benedict

April 6	Victoria Cougars	0–2	Montreal Maroons	Montreal Forum	Recap
No scoring		First period	No scoring
No scoring		Second period	02:50 – Nels Stewart (5); 19:10 – Nels Stewart (6)
No scoring		Third period	No scoring
Hap Holmes		Goalie stats	Clint Benedict

Montreal won series 3–1

== Awards ==
The new Prince of Wales Trophy was introduced this season. It was first presented to the Montreal Canadiens as winners of the first game in the new Madison Square Garden. The trophy was then intended to be used as a new trophy to be awarded to the champions of the National Hockey League. The existing O'Brien Cup, given also to the league champions, was not retired. Nels Stewart won the Hart for the first time in his career. Frank Nighbor won his second consecutive Lady Byng Trophy.

Hart Trophy: (Most valuable player)	Nels Stewart, Montreal Maroons
Lady Byng Trophy: (Excellence and sportsmanship)	Frank Nighbor, Ottawa Senators
O'Brien Cup: (League champions)	Montreal Maroons
Prince of Wales Trophy: (for winning first game in Madison Square Garden)	Montreal Canadiens
Prince of Wales Trophy: (League champions)	Montreal Maroons

== Player statistics ==
=== Scoring leaders ===
Note: GP = Games played; G = Goals; A = Assists; Pts = Points

Player	Team	GP	G	A	Pts
Nels Stewart	Montreal Maroons	36	34	8	42
Cy Denneny	Ottawa Senators	36	24	12	36
Carson Cooper	Boston Bruins	36	28	3	31
Jimmy Herbert	Boston Bruins	36	26	5	31
Howie Morenz	Montreal Canadiens	31	23	3	26
Jack Adams	Toronto St. Patricks	36	21	5	26
Aurel Joliat	Montreal Canadiens	35	17	9	26
Billy Burch	New York Americans	36	22	3	25
Hooley Smith	Ottawa Senators	28	16	9	25
Frank Nighbor	Ottawa Senators	35	12	13	25

Source: NHL.

=== Leading goaltenders ===
GP = Games played, GA = Goals against, SO = Shutouts, GAA = Goals against average

Player	Team	GP	GA	SO	GAA
Alec Connell	Ottawa Senators	36	42	15	1.12
Roy Worters	Pittsburgh Pirates	35	68	7	1.90
Clint Benedict	Montreal Maroons	36	73	6	1.92
Charles Stewart	Boston Bruins	35	80	6	2.21
Jake Forbes	New York Americans	36	89	2	2.30

=== NHL Playoff leading scorer ===
Note: GP = Games played; G = Goals; A = Assists; Pts = Points

Player	Team	GP	G	A	Pts
Nels Stewart	Montreal Maroons	8	6	3	9

== Coaches ==
- Boston Bruins: Art Ross
- Montreal Canadiens: Leo Dandurand
- Montreal Maroons: Eddie Gerard
- New York Americans: Tommy Gorman
- Ottawa Senators: Alex Currie
- Pittsburgh Pirates: Odie Cleghorn
- Toronto St. Patricks: Eddie Powers

== Debuts ==
The following is a list of players of note who played their first NHL game in 1925–26 (listed with their first team, asterisk(*) marks debut in playoffs):

- Wildor Larochelle, Montreal Canadiens
- Albert Leduc, Montreal Canadiens
- Pit Lepine, Montreal Canadiens
- Babe Siebert, Montreal Maroons
- Nels Stewart, Montreal Maroons
- Joe Simpson, New York Americans
- Hec Kilrea, Ottawa Senators
- Roy Worters, Pittsburgh Pirates
- Harold Darragh, Pittsburgh Pirates
- Baldy Cotton, Pittsburgh Pirates
- Lionel Conacher, Pittsburgh Pirates
- Hib Milks, Pittsburgh Pirates

== Last games ==
The following is a list of players of note that played their last game in the NHL in 1925–26 (listed with their last team):

- Gerry Geran, last active player to have been a member of the Montreal Wanderers franchise.
- Dave Ritchie, last active player to have been a member of the Quebec Bulldogs franchise.
- Georges Vezina, Montreal Canadiens

== Transactions ==
October 23, 1925	To Toronto St. Patricks Gerry Munro	To Montreal Maroons cash
November 8, 1925	To Boston Bruins Sprague Cleghorn	To Montreal Canadiens cash
November 25, 1925	To Pittsburgh Pirates Jesse Spring	To New York Americans Future considerations
January 14, 1926	To Toronto St. Patricks Normand Shay	To Boston Bruins cash
January 23, 1926	To Pittsburgh Pirates Odie Cleghorn	To New York Americans Joe Miller

== See also ==
- List of Stanley Cup champions
- Western Hockey League
- List of pre-NHL seasons
- 1925 in sports
- 1926 in sports
