= 1926–27 Montreal Canadiens season =

NHL hockey team season

1926–27 Montreal Canadiens
- Division: 2nd Canadian
- 1926–27 record: 28–14–2
- Home record: 15–5–2
- Road record: 13–9–0
- Goals for: 99
- Goals against: 67

Team information
- General manager: Leo Dandurand
- Coach: Cecil Hart
- Captain: Sylvio Mantha
- Arena: Montreal Forum

Team leaders
- Goals: Howie Morenz (25)
- Assists: Howie Morenz (7)
- Points: Howie Morenz (32)
- Penalty minutes: Aurele Joliat (79)
- Wins: George Hainsworth (28)
- Goals against average: George Hainsworth (1.47)

The 1926–27 Montreal Canadiens season was the team's 18th season, and tenth in the National Hockey League (NHL). The team rebounded from its last place finish to place second in the Canadian Division and qualify for the playoffs. The Canadiens defeated the rival Maroons in a two-game series before losing to the eventual Stanley Cup winner Ottawa Senators in the semi-finals.

== Regular season ==
The Canadiens, last place finishers in 1925–26, signed three players from the Western Hockey League. The team solved its goal-tending woes by signing George Hainsworth from Saskatoon, whom Georges Vezina had designated to be his successor. They further strengthened their team by signing Herb Gardiner from Calgary for defence and adding Art Gagne from Edmonton to the forwards.

The Canadiens moved into the Montreal Forum permanently this season. The club's first game was on November 18, 1926, against Ottawa, lost 2–1. The Canadiens won eleven games in a row from February 24 until March 24. The surge enabled the Canadiens to finish second in the Canadian Division to Ottawa.

=== Final standings ===
Canadian Division
	GP	W	L	T	GF	GA	Pts
**Ottawa Senators**	44	30	10	4	86	69	64
**Montreal Canadiens**	44	28	14	2	99	67	58
**Montreal Maroons**	44	20	20	4	71	68	44
New York Americans	44	17	25	2	82	91	36
Toronto St. Patricks	44	15	24	5	79	94	35

Note: W = Wins, L = Losses, T = Ties, GF = Goals For, GA = Goals Against, Pts = Points
Teams that qualified for the playoffs are highlighted in bold.

=== Record vs. opponents ===
==== Vs. Canadian Division ====
1926–27 NHL records
Team	**MTL**	**MTM**	**NYA**	**OTT**	**TOR**	**Total**
M. Canadiens	—	5–1	5–1	1–5	5–1	**16–8–0**
M. Maroons	1–5	—	4–2	1–3–2	5–1	**11–11–2**
N.Y. Americans	1–5	2–4	—	3–3	2–3–1	**8–15–1**
Ottawa	5–1	3–1–2	3–3	—	5–0–1	**16–5–3**
Toronto	1–5	1–5	3–2–1	0–5–1	—	**5–17–2**

==== Vs. American Division ====
1926–27 NHL records
Team	**BOS**	**CHI**	**DET**	**NYR**	**PIT**	**Total**
M. Canadiens	2–1–1	2–2	4–0	1–3	3–0–1	**12–6–2**
M. Maroons	2–2	2–2	3–1	1–2–1	1–2–1	**9–9–2**
N.Y. Americans	2–2	1–2–1	1–3	1–3	4–0	**9–10–1**
Ottawa	3–1	2–2	3–1	3–0–1	3–1	**14–5–1**
Toronto	3–1	2–2	2–1–1	1–2–1	2–1–1	**10–7–3**

== Schedule and results ==
1926–27 regular season
November

Game	Result	Date	Score	Opponent	Record
1	L	November 16, 1926	1–4	@ Boston Bruins (1926–27)	0–1–0
2	L	November 18, 1926	1–2	Ottawa Senators (1926–27)	0–2–0
3	L	November 20, 1926	1–2 OT	@ Montreal Maroons (1926–27)	0–3–0
4	W	November 23, 1926	2–0	New York Americans (1926–27)	1–3–0
5	L	November 27, 1926	0–2	New York Rangers (1926–27)	1–4–0

December

Game	Result	Date	Score	Opponent	Record
6	W	December 2, 1926	2–0	Toronto Maple Leafs (1926–27)	2–4–0
7	L	December 4, 1926	1–4	@ Ottawa Senators (1926–27)	2–5–0
8	W	December 7, 1926	3–2 OT	Montreal Maroons (1926–27)	3–5–0
9	W	December 9, 1926	5–2	@ Pittsburgh Pirates (1926–27)	4–5–0
10	L	December 11, 1926	0–3	Chicago Black Hawks (1926–27)	4–6–0
11	T	December 16, 1926	2–2 OT	Boston Bruins (1926–27)	4–6–1
12	W	December 18, 1926	2–0	@ Toronto Maple Leafs (1926–27)	5–6–1
13	W	December 22, 1926	3–1	@ Chicago Black Hawks (1926–27)	6–6–1
14	W	December 23, 1926	3–2	@ Detroit Cougars (1926–27)	7–6–1
15	W	December 30, 1926	1–0	Pittsburgh Pirates (1926–27)	8–6–1

January

Game	Result	Date	Score	Opponent	Record
16	L	January 1, 1927	1–2	@ Ottawa Senators (1926–27)	8–7–1
17	L	January 4, 1927	3–6	@ New York Americans (1926–27)	8–8–1
18	L	January 6, 1927	0–1	@ New York Rangers (1926–27)	8–9–1
19	L	January 8, 1927	0–2	Ottawa Senators (1926–27)	8–10–1
20	W	January 13, 1927	3–1	New York Americans (1926–27)	9–10–1
21	W	January 15, 1927	1–0	@ Montreal Maroons (1926–27)	10–10–1
22	W	January 18, 1927	5–3	Detroit Cougars (1926–27)	11–10–1
23	W	January 22, 1927	4–0	Toronto Maple Leafs (1926–27)	12–10–1
24	L	January 27, 1927	2–3	New York Rangers (1926–27)	12–11–1
25	W	January 30, 1927	2–1 OT	@ New York Americans (1926–27)	13–11–1

February

Game	Result	Date	Score	Opponent	Record
26	W	February 1, 1927	1–0 OT	@ New York Rangers (1926–27)	14–11–1
27	W	February 5, 1927	1–0	Montreal Maroons (1926–27)	15–11–1
28	L	February 11, 1927	1–6	@ Chicago Black Hawks (1926–27)	15–12–1
29	W	February 12, 1927	4–1	@ Detroit Cougars (1926–27)	16–12–1
30	T	February 15, 1927	1–1 OT	Pittsburgh Pirates (1926–27)	16–12–2
31	W	February 19, 1927	3–0	New York Americans (1926–27)	17–12–2
32	L	February 22, 1927	1–2 OT	@ Ottawa Senators (1926–27)	17–13–2
33	W	February 24, 1927	3–2	@ Toronto Maple Leafs (1926–27)	18–13–2
34	W	February 26, 1927	2–0	Boston Bruins (1926–27)	19–13–2

March

Game	Result	Date	Score	Opponent	Record
35	W	March 1, 1927	3–0	Detroit Cougars (1926–27)	20–13–2
36	W	March 3, 1927	7–1	Chicago Black Hawks (1926–27)	21–13–2
37	W	March 5, 1927	2–1	@ Pittsburgh Pirates (1926–27)	22–13–2
38	W	March 8, 1927	1–0	@ Montreal Maroons (1926–27)	23–13–2
39	W	March 10, 1927	4–2	Toronto Maple Leafs (1926–27)	24–13–2
40	W	March 15, 1927	4–1	Ottawa Senators (1926–27)	25–13–2
41	W	March 19, 1927	5–0	Montreal Maroons (1926–27)	26–13–2
42	W	March 22, 1927	1–0	@ Boston Bruins (1926–27)	27–13–2
43	W	March 24, 1927	6–3	@ New York Americans (1926–27)	28–13–2
44	L	March 26, 1927	1–2	@ Toronto Maple Leafs (1926–27)	28–14–2

Legend: Win (2 points) Loss (0 points) Tie (1 point)

== Playoffs ==
In a "Battle of Montreal" quarter-final, the Canadiens defeated the Maroons in a close two-game total-goals series 2–1. The Canadiens next took on the first place Ottawa Senators in the semi-finals. The eventual Stanley Cup champions defeated the Canadiens 5–1 in a two-game total-goals series.

Montreal Canadiens vs. Montreal Maroons

Date	Away	Score	Home	Score	Notes
March 29	Montreal Canadiens	1	Montreal Maroons	1	
March 31	Montreal Maroons	0	Montreal Canadiens	1	(OT)

Montreal Canadiens win total-goals series 2–1

Ottawa Senators vs. Montreal Canadiens

Date	Away	Score	Home	Score	Notes
April 2	Ottawa Senators	4	Montreal Canadiens	0	
April 4	Montreal Canadiens	1	Ottawa Senators	1	

Ottawa wins total-goals series 5–1

== Player statistics ==
=== Regular season ===
Scoring

Player	Pos	GP	G	A	Pts	PIM
Howie Morenz	C	44	25	7	32	49
Aurel Joliat	LW	43	14	4	18	79
Pit Lepine	C	44	16	1	17	20
Art Gagne	RW	44	14	3	17	42
Sylvio Mantha	D	43	10	5	15	77
Carson Cooper	RW	14	9	3	12	16
Herb Gardiner	D	44	6	6	12	26
Albert Leduc	D	43	5	2	7	62
Gizzy Hart	LW	40	3	3	6	8
Billy Boucher	RW	21	4	0	4	14
Wildor Larochelle	RW	41	0	1	1	6
Art Gauthier	C	13	0	0	0	0
George Hainsworth	G	44	0	0	0	0
Leo Lafrance	LW	4	0	0	0	0
Amby Moran	D	12	0	0	0	10
Pete Palangio	LW	6	0	0	0	0

Goaltending

Player	MIN	GP	W	L	T	GA	GAA	SO
George Hainsworth	2732	44	28	14	2	67	1.47	14
Team:	2732	44	28	14	2	67	1.47	14

=== Playoffs ===
Scoring

Player	Pos	GP	G	A	Pts	PIM
Aurel Joliat	LW	4	1	0	1	10
Sylvio Mantha	D	4	1	0	1	0
Howie Morenz	C	4	1	0	1	4
Carson Cooper	RW	3	0	0	0	0
Art Gagne	RW	4	0	0	0	0
Herb Gardiner	D	4	0	0	0	10
Art Gauthier	C	1	0	0	0	0
George Hainsworth	G	4	0	0	0	0
Gizzy Hart	LW	4	0	0	0	0
Wildor Larochelle	RW	4	0	0	0	0
Albert Leduc	D	4	0	0	0	2
Pit Lepine	C	4	0	0	0	4
Pete Palangio	LW	4	0	0	0	0

Goaltending

Player	MIN	GP	W	L	GA	GAA	SO
George Hainsworth	252	4	1	1	6	1.43	1
Team:	252	4	1	1	6	1.43	1

Note:

Pos = Position;GP = Games played; G = Goals; A = Assists; Pts = Points; PIM = Penalty minutes; +/- = Plus/minus; PPG = Power-play goals; SHG = Short-handed goals; GWG = Game-winning goals
Pos = Position;GP = Games played; Min, TOI = Minutes played; W = Wins; L = Losses; T,T/OT = Ties; OTL = Overtime losses; GA = Goals-against; GAA = Goals-against average; SO = Shutouts; SA = Shots against; SV = Shots saved;SV% = Save percentage;

== Awards ==
- Vezina Memorial Trophy – awarded to George Hainsworth

== Transactions ==
- January 17, 1927 – Billy Boucher traded to Boston Bruins for Carson Cooper with both teams holding right of recall.
- December 12, 1926 – Gizzy Hart traded to Montreal by Detroit for cash.

== See also ==
- 1926–27 NHL season
