= 1926–27 New York Americans season =

National Hockey League team season

1926–27 New York Americans
- Division: 4th Canadian
- 1926–27 record: 17–25–2
- Home record: 10–10–2
- Road record: 7–15–0
- Goals for: 82
- Goals against: 91

Team information
- General manager: Tommy Gorman
- Coach: Newsy Lalonde
- Captain: Billy Burch
- Arena: Madison Square Garden

Team leaders
- Goals: Billy Burch (19)
- Assists: Lionel Conacher (9)
- Points: Billy Burch (27)
- Penalty minutes: Lionel Conacher (63)
- Wins: Jake Forbes (17)
- Goals against average: Jake Forbes (2.01)

The 1926–27 New York Americans season was the second season of the New York Americans. The club added coach Newsy Lalonde and defenceman Red Dutton. The club improved its play to finish in fourth but again did not qualify for the playoffs.

== Offseason ==
Gorman decided to drop the coaching duties and he hired Newsy Lalonde from the former Saskatoon Sheiks of the Western Hockey League (WHL). As part of the dispersal of the WHL's players, Gorman signed defenceman Red Dutton of the Calgary Tigers, however Dutton ended up with the Montreal Maroons. Dutton would later be traded to the Americans.

== Regular season ==
=== Final standings ===
Canadian Division
	GP	W	L	T	GF	GA	Pts
**Ottawa Senators**	44	30	10	4	86	69	64
**Montreal Canadiens**	44	28	14	2	99	67	58
**Montreal Maroons**	44	20	20	4	71	68	44
New York Americans	44	17	25	2	82	91	36
Toronto St. Patricks	44	15	24	5	79	94	35

Note: W = Wins, L = Losses, T = Ties, GF = Goals For, GA = Goals Against, Pts = Points
Teams that qualified for the playoffs are highlighted in bold.

=== Record vs. opponents ===
==== Vs. Canadian Division ====
1926–27 NHL records
Team	**MTL**	**MTM**	**NYA**	**OTT**	**TOR**	**Total**
M. Canadiens	—	5–1	5–1	1–5	5–1	**16–8–0**
M. Maroons	1–5	—	4–2	1–3–2	5–1	**11–11–2**
N.Y. Americans	1–5	2–4	—	3–3	2–3–1	**8–15–1**
Ottawa	5–1	3–1–2	3–3	—	5–0–1	**16–5–3**
Toronto	1–5	1–5	3–2–1	0–5–1	—	**5–17–2**

==== Vs. American Division ====
1926–27 NHL records
Team	**BOS**	**CHI**	**DET**	**NYR**	**PIT**	**Total**
M. Canadiens	2–1–1	2–2	4–0	1–3	3–0–1	**12–6–2**
M. Maroons	2–2	2–2	3–1	1–2–1	1–2–1	**9–9–2**
N.Y. Americans	2–2	1–2–1	1–3	1–3	4–0	**9–10–1**
Ottawa	3–1	2–2	3–1	3–0–1	3–1	**14–5–1**
Toronto	3–1	2–2	2–1–1	1–2–1	2–1–1	**10–7–3**

== Schedule and results ==
1926–27 regular season
November

Game	Result	Date	Score	Opponent	Record
1	W	November 16, 1926	1–0	@ Pittsburgh Pirates (1926–27)	1–0–0
2	L	November 18, 1926	0–2	Montreal Maroons (1926–27)	1–1–0
3	L	November 20, 1926	1–2 OT	@ Ottawa Senators (1926–27)	1–2–0
4	L	November 23, 1926	0–2	@ Montreal Canadiens (1926–27)	1–3–0
5	W	November 25, 1926	4–1	@ Montreal Maroons (1926–27)	2–3–0
6	L	November 27, 1926	2–4	@ Detroit Cougars (1926–27)	2–4–0

December

Game	Result	Date	Score	Opponent	Record
7	T	December 1, 1926	2–2 OT	Chicago Black Hawks (1926–27)	2–4–1
8	W	December 4, 1926	1–0	@ Toronto Maple Leafs (1926–27)	3–4–1
9	W	December 11, 1926	4–2	@ Detroit Cougars (1926–27)	4–4–1
10	L	December 14, 1926	0–2	Ottawa Senators (1926–27)	4–5–1
11	L	December 18, 1926	2–4	@ Chicago Black Hawks (1926–27)	4–6–1
12	W	December 20, 1926	2–0	Toronto Maple Leafs (1926–27)	5–6–1
13	W	December 23, 1926	2–0	Pittsburgh Pirates (1926–27)	6–6–1
14	W	December 26, 1926	5–2	New York Rangers (1926–27)	7–6–1
15	L	December 28, 1926	1–2	@ Boston Bruins (1926–27)	7–7–1

January

Game	Result	Date	Score	Opponent	Record
16	W	January 2, 1927	3–0	Boston Bruins (1926–27)	8–7–1
17	W	January 4, 1927	6–3	Montreal Canadiens (1926–27)	9–7–1
18	W	January 6, 1927	4–3 OT	@ Montreal Maroons (1926–27)	10–7–1
19	L	January 8, 1927	1–3	@ Toronto Maple Leafs (1926–27)	10–8–1
20	L	January 11, 1927	0–1 OT	Detroit Cougars (1926–27)	10–9–1
21	L	January 13, 1927	1–3	@ Montreal Canadiens (1926–27)	10–10–1
22	W	January 15, 1927	2–1	@ Pittsburgh Pirates (1926–27)	11–10–1
23	L	January 18, 1927	1–2 OT	Montreal Maroons (1926–27)	11–11–1
24	L	January 23, 1927	0–2	@ New York Rangers (1926–27)	11–12–1
25	W	January 25, 1927	6–1	Ottawa Senators (1926–27)	12–12–1
26	L	January 30, 1927	1–2 OT	Montreal Canadiens (1926–27)	12–13–1

February

Game	Result	Date	Score	Opponent	Record
27	W	February 1, 1927	4–2	@ Ottawa Senators (1926–27)	13–13–1
28	T	February 3, 1927	0–0 OT	Toronto Maple Leafs (1926–27)	13–13–2
29	W	February 8, 1927	5–0	Pittsburgh Pirates (1926–27)	14–13–2
30	W	February 13, 1927	2–1 OT	Chicago Black Hawks (1926–27)	15–13–2
31	L	February 15, 1927	1–2	Montreal Maroons (1926–27)	15–14–2
32	L	February 17, 1927	1–4	@ Toronto Maple Leafs (1926–27)	15–15–2
33	L	February 19, 1927	0–3	@ Montreal Canadiens (1926–27)	15–16–2
34	L	February 23, 1927	1–3	@ Chicago Black Hawks (1926–27)	15–17–2
35	W	February 26, 1927	3–2 OT	Ottawa Senators (1926–27)	16–17–2
36	L	February 27, 1927	1–4	New York Rangers (1926–27)	16–18–2

March

Game	Result	Date	Score	Opponent	Record
37	W	March 1, 1927	3–0	Boston Bruins (1926–27)	17–18–2
38	L	March 5, 1927	0–5	@ Boston Bruins (1926–27)	17–19–2
39	L	March 12, 1927	3–4	@ Ottawa Senators (1926–27)	17–20–2
40	L	March 15, 1927	0–1	Detroit Cougars (1926–27)	17–21–2
41	L	March 17, 1927	1–2	@ Montreal Maroons (1926–27)	17–22–2
42	L	March 20, 1927	1–2	@ New York Rangers (1926–27)	17–23–2
43	L	March 21, 1927	1–4	Toronto Maple Leafs (1926–27)	17–24–2
44	L	March 24, 1927	3–6	Montreal Canadiens (1926–27)	17–25–2

Legend: Win (2 points) Loss (0 points) Tie (1 point)

== Player statistics ==
=== Regular season ===
Scoring

Player	GP	G	A	Pts	PIM
Billy Burch	43	19	8	27	40
Lionel Conacher	30	8	9	17	81
Red Green	43	10	4	14	53
Leo Reise	40	7	6	13	24
Mickey Roach	44	11	0	11	14
Normie Himes	42	9	2	11	14
Laurie Scott	39	6	2	8	22
Joe Simpson	43	4	2	6	39
Edmond Bouchard	38	2	1	3	12
Shorty Green	21	2	1	3	17
Alex McKinnon	42	2	1	3	29
Charlie Langlois	9	2	0	2	8
Bob Connors	6	1	0	1	0
Clarence Boucher	11	0	1	1	4
Jake Forbes	44	0	0	0	0
Bill Holmes	1	0	0	0	0
Newsy Lalonde	1	0	0	0	2
Ken Randall	3	0	0	0	0

Goaltending

Player	MIN	GP	W	L	T	GA	GAA	SA	SV	SV%	SO
Jake Forbes	2715	44	17	25	2	91	2.01				8
Team:	2715	44	17	25	2	91	2.01				8

== See also ==
- 1926–27 NHL season
