= 1926–27 Toronto St. Patricks season =

NHL hockey team season

1926–27 Toronto St. Patricks
- Division: 5th Canadian
- 1926–27 record: 15–24–5
- Home record: 10–10–2
- Road record: 5–14–3
- Goals for: 79
- Goals against: 94

Team information
- General manager: Charlie Querrie
- Coach: Charles Querrie; Mike Rodden; Alex Romeril
- Captain: Bert Corbeau
- Arena: Arena Gardens

Team leaders
- Goals: Bill Carson (16)
- Assists: Ace Bailey (13)
- Points: Ace Bailey (28)
- Penalty minutes: Bert Corbeau (88)
- Wins: John Ross Roach (15)
- Goals against average: John Ross Roach (2.04)

The 1926–27 Toronto St. Patricks season was the tenth season and the last under the St. Patricks banner for the Toronto National Hockey League (NHL) franchise. In February 1927, Conn Smythe and investors purchased the St. Patricks and changed the name to the Toronto Maple Leafs. On the ice, the team finished in fifth place and out of the playoffs for the second year in a row, for the first time since the 1922–23 and 1923–24 seasons.

== Regular season ==
After being turned down by the St. Patricks as coach to start the season, Conn Smythe used the success of the New York Rangers team he had assembled, to get an invitation to take over the team. At first, Smythe turned down the offer, saying that he wanted to be an owner or part-owner of the club instead. The St. Pats were for sale, and partner J. P. Bickell offered Smythe a chance to become part-owner. The club had reached a tentative deal to sell the club for $200,000, making Bickell's share $40,000. Bickell offered to hold onto his share, if Smythe could raise $160,000 to pay of the other share-holders and take over the team. On February 14, 1927, Smythe and partners paid $85,000 with the final $75,000 to pay off the club due within 30 days. Smythe renamed the team the Maple Leafs, a name and insignia he felt would be popular, more popular than St. Patricks.

The club played its final game as the St. Patricks against Detroit in Windsor, Ontario on February 15, 1927, and their first as the Maple Leafs at Arena Gardens on February 17, 1927. The Leafs wore new white uniforms with a green maple leaf and Toronto written on the sweater. The Leafs won their first game 4–1, under new coach Alex Romeril. Smythe took over as governor, but did not assume the management and coaching of the Leafs until 1927–28. He had commitments to coach the University of Toronto team and the Varsity Grads, a team of former U of T students who had played for the U of T team. He would coach the Grads to the Allan Cup title.

=== Final standings ===
Canadian Division
	GP	W	L	T	GF	GA	Pts
**Ottawa Senators**	44	30	10	4	86	69	64
**Montreal Canadiens**	44	28	14	2	99	67	58
**Montreal Maroons**	44	20	20	4	71	68	44
New York Americans	44	17	25	2	82	91	36
Toronto St. Patricks	44	15	24	5	79	94	35

Note: W = Wins, L = Losses, T = Ties, GF = Goals For, GA = Goals Against, Pts = Points
Teams that qualified for the playoffs are highlighted in bold.

=== Record vs. opponents ===
==== Vs. Canadian Division ====
1926–27 NHL records
Team	MTL	MTM	NYA	OTT	TOR	Total
M. Canadiens	—	5–1	5–1	1–5	5–1	**16–8–0**
M. Maroons	1–5	—	4–2	1–3–2	5–1	**11–11–2**
N.Y. Americans	1–5	2–4	—	3–3	2–3–1	**8–15–1**
Ottawa	5–1	3–1–2	3–3	—	5–0–1	**16–5–3**
Toronto	1–5	1–5	3–2–1	0–5–1	—	**5–17–2**

==== Vs. American Division ====
1926–27 NHL records
Team	BOS	CHI	DET	NYR	PIT	Total
M. Canadiens	2–1–1	2–2	4–0	1–3	3–0–1	**12–6–2**
M. Maroons	2–2	2–2	3–1	1–2–1	1–2–1	**9–9–2**
N.Y. Americans	2–2	1–2–1	1–3	1–3	4–0	**9–10–1**
Ottawa	3–1	2–2	3–1	3–0–1	3–1	**14–5–1**
Toronto	3–1	2–2	2–1–1	1–2–1	2–1–1	**10–7–3**

== Schedule and results ==
1926–27 regular season
November

Game	Result	Date	Score	Opponent	Record
1	L	November 17, 1926	1–4	@ Chicago Black Hawks (1926–27)	0–1–0
2	L	November 20, 1926	1–5	New York Rangers (1926–27)	0–2–0
3	T	November 25, 1926	2–2 OT	Ottawa Senators (1926–27)	0–2–1
4	W	November 30, 1926	6–0	Pittsburgh Pirates (1926–27)	1–2–1

December

Game	Result	Date	Score	Opponent	Record
5	L	December 2, 1926	0–2	@ Montreal Canadiens (1926–27)	1–3–1
6	L	December 4, 1926	0–1	New York Americans (1926–27)	1–4–1
7	W	December 9, 1926	5–2	Chicago Black Hawks (1926–27)	2–4–1
8	L	December 11, 1926	1–2	@ Ottawa Senators (1926–27)	2–5–1
9	L	December 14, 1926	0–3	@ Montreal Maroons (1926–27)	2–6–1
10	L	December 18, 1926	0–2	Montreal Canadiens (1926–27)	2–7–1
11	L	December 20, 1926	0–2	@ New York Americans (1926–27)	2–8–1
12	W	December 21, 1926	5–3	@ Boston Bruins (1926–27)	3–8–1
13	L	December 25, 1926	2–3	@ Pittsburgh Pirates (1926–27)	3–9–1
14	W	December 30, 1926	4–1	Boston Bruins (1926–27)	4–9–1

January

Game	Result	Date	Score	Opponent	Record
15	L	January 1, 1927	0–3	Montreal Maroons (1926–27)	4–10–1
16	W	January 4, 1927	2–1	@ Detroit Cougars (1926–27)	5–10–1
17	W	January 8, 1927	3–1	New York Americans (1926–27)	6–10–1
18	L	January 11, 1927	1–4	@ Ottawa Senators (1926–27)	6–11–1
19	T	January 13, 1927	1–1 OT	@ New York Rangers (1926–27)	6–11–2
20	T	January 15, 1927	1–1 OT	Detroit Cougars (1926–27)	6–11–3
21	L	January 19, 1927	3–4 OT	@ Chicago Black Hawks (1926–27)	6–12–3
22	L	January 22, 1927	0–4	@ Montreal Canadiens (1926–27)	6–13–3
23	L	January 27, 1927	3–5	Montreal Maroons (1926–27)	6–14–3
24	W	January 29, 1927	6–1	Chicago Black Hawks (1926–27)	7–14–3

February

Game	Result	Date	Score	Opponent	Record
25	L	February 1, 1927	0–1	@ Boston Bruins (1926–27)	7–15–3
26	T	February 3, 1927	0–0 OT	@ New York Americans (1926–27)	7–15–4
27	W	February 5, 1927	1–0	Boston Bruins (1926–27)	8–15–4
28	L	February 8, 1927	0–3	@ Montreal Maroons (1926–27)	8–16–4
29	L	February 10, 1927	2–3	New York Rangers (1926–27)	8–17–4
30	L	February 12, 1927	0–1	Ottawa Senators (1926–27)	8–18–4
31	L	February 15, 1927	1–5	@ Detroit Cougars (1926–27)	8–19–4
32	W	February 17, 1927	4–1	New York Americans (1926–27)	9–19–4
33	L	February 19, 1927	1–2 OT	Montreal Maroons (1926–27)	9–20–4
34	W	February 22, 1927	3–2 OT	@ New York Rangers (1926–27)	10–20–4
35	L	February 24, 1927	2–3	Montreal Canadiens (1926–27)	10–21–4
36	T	February 26, 1927	1–1 OT	@ Pittsburgh Pirates (1926–27)	10–21–5

March

Game	Result	Date	Score	Opponent	Record
37	W	March 1, 1927	4–1	Pittsburgh Pirates (1926–27)	11–21–5
38	W	March 5, 1927	4–2	Detroit Cougars (1926–27)	12–21–5
39	L	March 10, 1927	2–4	@ Montreal Canadiens (1926–27)	12–22–5
40	W	March 12, 1927	1–0	@ Montreal Maroons (1926–27)	13–22–5
41	L	March 19, 1927	0–2	Ottawa Senators (1926–27)	13–23–5
42	W	March 21, 1927	4–1	@ New York Americans (1926–27)	14–23–5
43	L	March 24, 1927	0–4	@ Ottawa Senators (1926–27)	14–24–5
44	W	March 26, 1927	2–1	Montreal Canadiens (1926–27)	15–24–5

Legend: Win (2 points) Loss (0 points) Tie (1 point)

== Player statistics ==
=== Regular season ===
Scoring

Player	Pos	GP	G	A	Pts	PIM
Ace Bailey	RW	42	15	13	28	82
Bill Carson	C	40	16	6	22	41
Hap Day	D	44	11	5	16	50
Butch Keeling	LW	30	11	2	13	29
Bert McCaffrey	RW/D	43	5	5	10	43
Bill Brydge	D	41	6	3	9	76
Corb Denneny	C	29	7	1	8	24
George Patterson	W	17	4	2	6	17
Bert Corbeau	D	41	1	2	3	88
Haldor Halderson	D	25	1	2	3	36
Lloyd Gross	LW	16	1	1	2	0
Danny Cox	LW	14	0	1	1	4
Pete Bellefeuille	RW	13	0	0	0	12
Leo Bourgeault	D	22	0	0	0	44
Al Pudas	W	4	0	0	0	0
John Ross Roach	G	44	0	0	0	0
Jesse Spring	D	2	0	0	0	0
Carl Voss	C	12	0	0	0	0

Goaltending

Player	MIN	GP	W	L	T	GA	GAA	SO
John Ross Roach	2764	44	15	24	5	94	2.04	4
Team:	2764	44	15	24	5	94	2.04	4

Note:

Pos = Position;GP = Games played; G = Goals; A = Assists; Pts = Points; PIM = Penalty minutes; +/- = Plus/minus; PPG = Power-play goals; SHG = Short-handed goals; GWG = Game-winning goals
Pos = Position;GP = Games played; Min, TOI = Minutes played; W = Wins; L = Losses; T,T/OT = Ties; OTL = Overtime losses; GA = Goals-against; GAA = Goals-against average; SO = Shutouts; SA = Shots against; SV = Shots saved;SV% = Save percentage;

== Transactions ==
- September 7, 1926: Signed Free Agent Butch Keeling
- September 27, 1926: Acquired Corbett Denneny, Leo Bourgeault and Laurie Scott from the Saskatoon Shieks (PrHL) for cash
- October 13, 1926: Signed Free Agents Bill Brydge and Danny Cox
- October 15, 1926: Lost Free Agent Reg Reid to the Stratford Nationals of the CPHL
- October 16, 1926: Lost Mike Neville off Waivers to the Hamilton Tigers of the CPHL
- October 18, 1926: Lost Francis Cain off Waivers to the Hamilton Tigers of the CPHL
- October 18, 1926: Lost Norm Shay off Waivers to the New Haven Eagles of the Can-Am League
- October 18, 1926: Traded Babe Dye to the Chicago Black Hawks for $15,000
- October 28, 1926: Signed Free Agent Albert Pudas
- November 1, 1926: Lost Free Agent Chris Speyer to the Niagara Falls Cataracts of the CPHL
- November 3, 1926: Signed Free Agent Ace Bailey
- November 10, 1926: Traded Albert Pudas to the Windsor Hornets of the CPHL for cash
- November 12, 1926: Lost Free Agent Howard Lockhart to the Hamilton Tigers of the CPHL
- November 15, 1926: Acquired Jesse Spring from the New York Americans for Laurie Scott
- November 17, 1926: Lost Free Agent Gerry Munro to the Detroit Greyhounds of the AHA
- January 7, 1927: Acquired Haldor Halderson from the Victoria Cougars (PCHL) for Pete Bellefeuille
- February 1, 1927: Transaction from September 27, 1926, voided; Corbett Denneny, Leo Bourgeault and Laurie Scott returned to Saskatoon Sheiks (PrHL), cash returned to Toronto
- February 1, 1927: Acquired George Patterson from Hamilton Tigers of the CPHL for loan of Albert Pudas and $5,000
- March 7, 1927: Signed Free Agent Lloyd Gross
- March 17, 1927: Signed Free Agent Beattie Ramsay

== See also ==
- 1926–27 NHL season
