= 1926–27 Montreal Maroons season =

Montreal Maroons hockey season

1926–27 Montreal Maroons
- Division: 3rd Canadian
- 1926–27 record: 20–20–4
- Home record: 6–13–3
- Road record: 14–7–1
- Goals for: 71
- Goals against: 68

Team information
- Coach: Eddie Gerard
- Captain: Dunc Munro
- Arena: Montreal Forum

Team leaders
- Goals: Nels Stewart (17)
- Assists: Punch Broadbent; Dunc Munro (5)
- Points: Nels Stewart (21)
- Penalty minutes: Nels Stewart (129)
- Wins: Clint Benedict (20)
- Goals against average: Clint Benedict (1.42)

The 1926–27 Montreal Maroons season was the hockey team's third year of operation. After winning the Stanley Cup in 1925–26, the club was not able to defend the championship, losing in the first round of the playoffs to the Montreal Canadiens.

== Regular season ==
=== Final standings ===
Canadian Division
| | GP | W | L | T | GF | GA | Pts |
|---|---|---|---|---|---|---|---|
| **Ottawa Senators** | 44 | 30 | 10 | 4 | 86 | 69 | 64 |
| **Montreal Canadiens** | 44 | 28 | 14 | 2 | 99 | 67 | 58 |
| **Montreal Maroons** | 44 | 20 | 20 | 4 | 71 | 68 | 44 |
| New York Americans | 44 | 17 | 25 | 2 | 82 | 91 | 36 |
| Toronto St. Patricks | 44 | 15 | 24 | 5 | 79 | 94 | 35 |

Note: W = Wins, L = Losses, T = Ties, GF = Goals For, GA = Goals Against, Pts = Points
Teams that qualified for the playoffs are highlighted in bold.

=== Record vs. opponents ===
==== Vs. Canadian Division ====
1926–27 NHL records
| Team | **MTL** | **MTM** | **NYA** | **OTT** | **TOR** | **Total** |
|---|---|---|---|---|---|---|
| M. Canadiens | — | 5–1 | 5–1 | 1–5 | 5–1 | **16–8–0** |
| M. Maroons | 1–5 | — | 4–2 | 1–3–2 | 5–1 | **11–11–2** |
| N.Y. Americans | 1–5 | 2–4 | — | 3–3 | 2–3–1 | **8–15–1** |
| Ottawa | 5–1 | 3–1–2 | 3–3 | — | 5–0–1 | **16–5–3** |
| Toronto | 1–5 | 1–5 | 3–2–1 | 0–5–1 | — | **5–17–2** |

==== Vs. American Division ====
1926–27 NHL records
| Team | **BOS** | **CHI** | **DET** | **NYR** | **PIT** | **Total** |
|---|---|---|---|---|---|---|
| M. Canadiens | 2–1–1 | 2–2 | 4–0 | 1–3 | 3–0–1 | **12–6–2** |
| M. Maroons | 2–2 | 2–2 | 3–1 | 1–2–1 | 1–2–1 | **9–9–2** |
| N.Y. Americans | 2–2 | 1–2–1 | 1–3 | 1–3 | 4–0 | **9–10–1** |
| Ottawa | 3–1 | 2–2 | 3–1 | 3–0–1 | 3–1 | **14–5–1** |
| Toronto | 3–1 | 2–2 | 2–1–1 | 1–2–1 | 2–1–1 | **10–7–3** |

== Schedule and results ==
1926–27 regular season
November

| Game | Result | Date | Score | Opponent | Record |
|---|---|---|---|---|---|
| 1 | L | November 16, 1926 | 0–1 | @ New York Rangers (1926–27) | 0–1–0 |
| 2 | W | November 18, 1926 | 2–0 | @ New York Americans (1926–27) | 1–1–0 |
| 3 | W | November 20, 1926 | 2–1 OT | Montreal Canadiens (1926–27) | 2–1–0 |
| 4 | W | November 23, 1926 | 2–1 | @ Boston Bruins (1926–27) | 3–1–0 |
| 5 | L | November 25, 1926 | 1–4 | New York Americans (1926–27) | 3–2–0 |
| 6 | L | November 27, 1926 | 0–1 OT | @ Ottawa Senators (1926–27) | 3–3–0 |
| 7 | L | November 30, 1926 | 0–4 | Detroit Cougars (1926–27) | 3–4–0 |

December

| Game | Result | Date | Score | Opponent | Record |
|---|---|---|---|---|---|
| 8 | L | December 4, 1926 | 3–5 | Chicago Black Hawks (1926–27) | 3–5–0 |
| 9 | L | December 7, 1926 | 2–3 OT | @ Montreal Canadiens (1926–27) | 3–6–0 |
| 10 | T | December 11, 1926 | 2–2 OT | @ Pittsburgh Pirates (1926–27) | 3–6–1 |
| 11 | W | December 14, 1926 | 3–0 | Toronto Maple Leafs (1926–27) | 4–6–1 |
| 12 | T | December 18, 1926 | 0–0 OT | Ottawa Senators (1926–27) | 4–6–2 |
| 13 | L | December 23, 1926 | 1–2 | Boston Bruins (1926–27) | 4–7–2 |
| 14 | L | December 29, 1926 | 4–5 OT | @ Chicago Black Hawks (1926–27) | 4–8–2 |
| 15 | W | December 30, 1926 | 2–0 | @ Detroit Cougars (1926–27) | 5–8–2 |

January

| Game | Result | Date | Score | Opponent | Record |
|---|---|---|---|---|---|
| 16 | W | January 1, 1927 | 3–0 | @ Toronto Maple Leafs (1926–27) | 6–8–2 |
| 17 | L | January 6, 1927 | 3–4 OT | New York Americans (1926–27) | 6–9–2 |
| 18 | W | January 8, 1927 | 3–0 | @ Boston Bruins (1926–27) | 7–9–2 |
| 19 | L | January 11, 1927 | 2–3 | New York Rangers (1926–27) | 7–10–2 |
| 20 | L | January 15, 1927 | 0–1 | Montreal Canadiens (1926–27) | 7–11–2 |
| 21 | W | January 18, 1927 | 2–1 OT | @ New York Americans (1926–27) | 8–11–2 |
| 22 | L | January 20, 1927 | 1–3 | Pittsburgh Pirates (1926–27) | 8–12–2 |
| 23 | L | January 22, 1927 | 0–1 | @ Ottawa Senators (1926–27) | 8–13–2 |
| 24 | W | January 25, 1927 | 2–1 OT | Detroit Cougars (1926–27) | 9–13–2 |
| 25 | W | January 27, 1927 | 5–3 | @ Toronto Maple Leafs (1926–27) | 10–13–2 |
| 26 | T | January 29, 1927 | 0–0 OT | Ottawa Senators (1926–27) | 10–13–3 |

February

| Game | Result | Date | Score | Opponent | Record |
|---|---|---|---|---|---|
| 27 | W | February 3, 1927 | 3–0 | Chicago Black Hawks (1926–27) | 11–13–3 |
| 28 | L | February 5, 1927 | 0–1 | @ Montreal Canadiens (1926–27) | 11–14–3 |
| 29 | W | February 8, 1927 | 3–0 | Toronto Maple Leafs (1926–27) | 12–14–3 |
| 30 | W | February 10, 1927 | 1–0 | @ Pittsburgh Pirates (1926–27) | 13–14–3 |
| 31 | L | February 12, 1927 | 2–3 | Boston Bruins (1926–27) | 13–15–3 |
| 32 | W | February 15, 1927 | 2–1 | @ New York Americans (1926–27) | 14–15–3 |
| 33 | W | February 17, 1927 | 4–1 | @ New York Rangers (1926–27) | 15–15–3 |
| 34 | W | February 19, 1927 | 2–1 OT | @ Toronto Maple Leafs (1926–27) | 16–15–3 |
| 35 | L | February 22, 1927 | 0–3 | Pittsburgh Pirates (1926–27) | 16–16–3 |
| 36 | W | February 24, 1927 | 2–0 | @ Detroit Cougars (1926–27) | 17–16–3 |
| 37 | W | February 26, 1927 | 2–1 OT | @ Chicago Black Hawks (1926–27) | 18–16–3 |

March

| Game | Result | Date | Score | Opponent | Record |
|---|---|---|---|---|---|
| 38 | T | March 5, 1927 | 0–0 OT | New York Rangers (1926–27) | 18–16–4 |
| 39 | L | March 8, 1927 | 0–1 | Montreal Canadiens (1926–27) | 18–17–4 |
| 40 | W | March 10, 1927 | 1–0 | @ Ottawa Senators (1926–27) | 19–17–4 |
| 41 | L | March 12, 1927 | 0–1 | Toronto Maple Leafs (1926–27) | 19–18–4 |
| 42 | W | March 17, 1927 | 2–1 | New York Americans (1926–27) | 20–18–4 |
| 43 | L | March 19, 1927 | 0–5 | @ Montreal Canadiens (1926–27) | 20–19–4 |
| 44 | L | March 26, 1927 | 2–3 | Ottawa Senators (1926–27) | 20–20–4 |

Legend: Win (2 points) Loss (0 points) Tie (1 point)

== Playoffs ==
The Maroons faced off in a two-game total goals series, a 'Battle of Montreal', against the Montreal Canadiens. The first game finished in a 1–1 tie. The second game went to overtime in a scoreless tie, before the Canadiens scored to win the series, 2–1 on goals.

== Player statistics ==
=== Regular season ===
Scoring

| Player | Pos | GP | G | A | Pts | PIM |
|---|---|---|---|---|---|---|
| Nels Stewart | C | 43 | 17 | 4 | 21 | 133 |
| Merlyn Phillips | C | 43 | 15 | 1 | 16 | 45 |
| Punch Broadbent | RW | 42 | 9 | 5 | 14 | 88 |
| Russell Oatman | LW | 25 | 8 | 4 | 12 | 30 |
| Dunc Munro | D | 43 | 6 | 5 | 11 | 42 |
| Babe Siebert | LW/D | 42 | 5 | 3 | 8 | 116 |
| Red Dutton | D | 44 | 4 | 4 | 8 | 108 |
| Reg Noble | C/D | 43 | 3 | 3 | 6 | 112 |
| Frank Carson | RW | 44 | 2 | 3 | 5 | 12 |
| Sam Rothschild | LW | 22 | 1 | 1 | 2 | 8 |
| Chuck Dinsmore | C | 28 | 1 | 0 | 1 | 6 |
| Babe Donnelly | D | 34 | 0 | 1 | 1 | 14 |
| Clint Benedict | G | 43 | 0 | 0 | 0 | 0 |
| Hap Emms | LW/D | 8 | 0 | 0 | 0 | 0 |
| Albert Holway | D | 13 | 0 | 0 | 0 | 2 |
| George Horne | RW | 2 | 0 | 0 | 0 | 0 |
| Flat Walsh | G | 1 | 0 | 0 | 0 | 0 |

Goaltending

| Player | MIN | GP | W | L | T | GA | GAA | SO |
|---|---|---|---|---|---|---|---|---|
| Clint Benedict | 2748 | 43 | 20 | 19 | 4 | 65 | 1.42 | 13 |
| Flat Walsh | 60 | 1 | 0 | 1 | 0 | 3 | 3.00 | 0 |
| Team: | 2808 | 44 | 20 | 20 | 4 | 68 | 1.45 | 13 |

=== Playoffs ===
Scoring

| Player | Pos | GP | G | A | Pts | PIM |
|---|---|---|---|---|---|---|
| Babe Siebert | LW/D | 2 | 1 | 0 | 1 | 2 |
| Clint Benedict | G | 2 | 0 | 0 | 0 | 0 |
| Punch Broadbent | RW | 2 | 0 | 0 | 0 | 0 |
| Frank Carson | RW | 2 | 0 | 0 | 0 | 2 |
| Babe Donnelly | D | 2 | 0 | 0 | 0 | 0 |
| Red Dutton | D | 2 | 0 | 0 | 0 | 4 |
| Dunc Munro | D | 2 | 0 | 0 | 0 | 4 |
| Reg Noble | C/D | 2 | 0 | 0 | 0 | 2 |
| Russell Oatman | LW | 2 | 0 | 0 | 0 | 0 |
| Merlyn Phillips | C | 2 | 0 | 0 | 0 | 0 |
| Sam Rothschild | LW | 2 | 0 | 0 | 0 | 0 |
| Nels Stewart | C | 2 | 0 | 0 | 0 | 4 |

Goaltending

| Player | MIN | GP | W | L | T | GA | GAA | SO |
|---|---|---|---|---|---|---|---|---|
| Clint Benedict | 132 | 2 | 0 | 1 | 1 | 2 | 0.91 | 0 |
| Team: | 132 | 2 | 0 | 1 | 1 | 2 | 0.91 | 0 |

Note: GP = Games played; G = Goals; A = Assists; Pts = Points; +/- = Plus/minus; PIM = Penalty minutes; PPG = Power-play goals; SHG = Short-handed goals; GWG = Game-winning goals
MIN = Minutes played; W = Wins; L = Losses; T = Ties; GA = Goals against; GAA = Goals against average; SO = Shutouts;

== See also ==
- 1926–27 NHL season
