= 1926–27 Ottawa Senators season =

Professional ice hockey team season of play

1926–27 Ottawa Senators
- Stanley Cup champions
- Prince of Wales Trophy winners
- O'Brien Trophy winners
- Canadian Division champions
- Division: 1st Canadian
- 1926–27 record: 30–10–4
- Home record: 16–5–1
- Road record: 14–5–3
- Goals for: 86
- Goals against: 69

Team information
- General manager: Dave Gill
- Coach: Dave Gill
- Captain: Buck Boucher
- Arena: Ottawa Auditorium

Team leaders
- Goals: Cy Denneny (17)
- Assists: King Clancy (10)
- Points: Cy Denneny (23)
- Penalty minutes: Hooley Smith (125)
- Wins: Alec Connell (30)
- Goals against average: Alec Connell (1.49)

The 1926–27 Ottawa Senators season was the club's tenth season of play in the NHL, 42nd overall. The Senators won the Stanley Cup for the fourth time in seven years, and eleventh overall including the pre-NHL years.

== Pre-season ==
Prior to the start of the season, the Senators relieved head coach Alex Currie from his duties. General Manager Dave Gill would step behind the bench and become the head coach. Buck Boucher would take over the team captaincy from Cy Denneny.

== Regular season ==
The league expanded by three teams, as the Chicago Black Hawks, Detroit Cougars and New York Rangers all joined to make it a ten-team league. The NHL also divided the ten teams into two divisions, and the Senators were placed in the Canadian Division. This was also the first season that the Stanley Cup was awarded to the champion of the NHL.

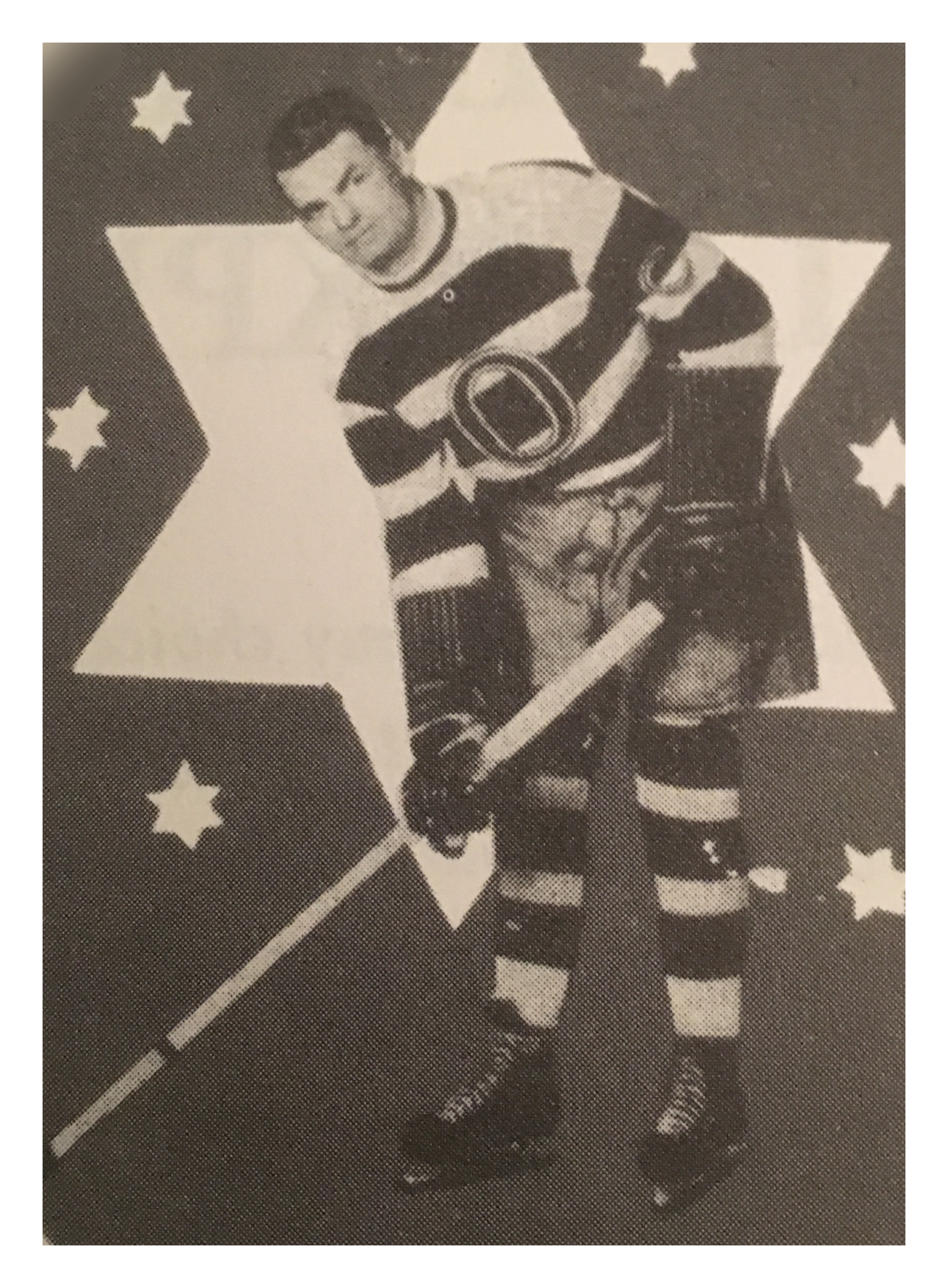
Frank Finnigan

On December 6, 1926, Frank Finnigan and Cy Denneny were injured in an automobile accident, when both were thrown through the windshield resulting in head injuries. Finnigan received a skull fracture, and both players missed the subsequent road trip.

The Senators won 30 games and earn 64 points, both the highest in the NHL and capture the Prince of Wales Trophy, win the Canadian Division title, and earn a bye in the opening round of the playoffs.

Denneny led the club once again offensively, scoring 17 goals and 23 points, while Hooley Smith had a team record 125 penalty minutes. Alec Connell would lead the NHL in wins (30) and be among the league leaders in GAA (1.49) and shutouts (13).

=== Final standings ===
Canadian Division
	GP	W	L	T	GF	GA	Pts
**Ottawa Senators**	44	30	10	4	86	69	64
**Montreal Canadiens**	44	28	14	2	99	67	58
**Montreal Maroons**	44	20	20	4	71	68	44
New York Americans	44	17	25	2	82	91	36
Toronto St. Patricks	44	15	24	5	79	94	35

Note: W = Wins, L = Losses, T = Ties, GF = Goals For, GA = Goals Against, Pts = Points
Teams that qualified for the playoffs are highlighted in bold.

=== Record vs. opponents ===
==== Vs. Canadian Division ====
1926–27 NHL records
Team	MTL	MTM	NYA	OTT	TOR	Total
M. Canadiens	—	5–1	5–1	1–5	5–1	**16–8–0**
M. Maroons	1–5	—	4–2	1–3–2	5–1	**11–11–2**
N.Y. Americans	1–5	2–4	—	3–3	2–3–1	**8–15–1**
Ottawa	5–1	3–1–2	3–3	—	5–0–1	**16–5–3**
Toronto	1–5	1–5	3–2–1	0–5–1	—	**5–17–2**

==== Vs. American Division ====
1926–27 NHL records
Team	BOS	CHI	DET	NYR	PIT	Total
M. Canadiens	2–1–1	2–2	4–0	1–3	3–0–1	**12–6–2**
M. Maroons	2–2	2–2	3–1	1–2–1	1–2–1	**9–9–2**
N.Y. Americans	2–2	1–2–1	1–3	1–3	4–0	**9–10–1**
Ottawa	3–1	2–2	3–1	3–0–1	3–1	**14–5–1**
Toronto	3–1	2–2	2–1–1	1–2–1	2–1–1	**10–7–3**

== Playoffs ==
=== Ottawa Senators 5, Montreal Canadiens 1 ===
The Montreal Canadiens would defeat their cross town rivals, the Montreal Maroons and face the Senators in a two-game total-goal series, and Ottawa would win it by a score of 5–1, and match up against the Boston Bruins in the Stanley Cup Finals.

=== Ottawa Senators 2, Boston Bruins 0 ===
Led by Cy Denneny and Alec Connell, the Senators would win a tough four game series over the Bruins, winning the Stanley Cup for the fourth time in seven years.

== Schedule and results ==
=== Regular season ===
1926–27 regular season
November: 4–0–1 (home: 2–0–0; road: 2–0–1)

Game	Date	Visitor	Score	Home	OT	Decision	Attendance	Arena	Record	Pts
1	November 18	Ottawa	2–1	Canadiens		Connell	N/A	Montreal Forum	1–0–0	2
2	November 20	Americans	1–2	Ottawa	OT	Connell	N/A	Ottawa Auditorium	2–0–0	4
3	November 25	Ottawa	2–2	Toronto	OT	Connell	N/A	Mutual Street Arena	2–0–1	5
4	November 27	Maroons	0–1	Ottawa	OT	Connell	N/A	Ottawa Auditorium	3–0–1	7
5	November 30	Ottawa	2–1	Boston		Connell	N/A	Boston Arena	4–0–1	9

December: 7–1–1 (home: 3–1–0; road: 4–0–1)

Game	Date	Visitor	Score	Home	OT	Decision	Attendance	Arena	Record	Pts
6	December 4	Canadiens	1–4	Ottawa		Connell	N/A	Ottawa Auditorium	5–0–1	11
7	December 7	Ottawa	3–2	Chicago		Connell	N/A	Chicago Coliseum	6–0–1	13
8	December 9	Ottawa	3–1	Detroit		Connell	N/A	Border Cities Arena	7–0–1	15
9	December 11	Toronto	1–2	Ottawa		Connell	N/A	Ottawa Auditorium	8–0–1	17
10	December 14	Ottawa	2–0	Americans		Connell	N/A	Madison Square Garden	9–0–1	19
11	December 16	Detroit	5–0	Ottawa		Connell	N/A	Ottawa Auditorium	9–1–1	19
12	December 18	Ottawa	0–0	Maroons	OT	Connell	N/A	Montreal Forum	9–1–2	20
13	December 23	Rangers	0–1	Ottawa		Connell	N/A	Ottawa Auditorium	10–1–2	22
14	December 28	Ottawa	3–2	Rangers	OT	Connell	N/A	Madison Square Garden	11–1–2	24

January: 7–3–1 (home: 5–1–0; road: 2–2–1)

Game	Date	Visitor	Score	Home	OT	Decision	Attendance	Arena	Record	Pts
15	January 1	Canadiens	1–2	Ottawa		Connell	N/A	Ottawa Auditorium	12–1–2	26
16	January 4	Ottawa	1–2	Boston	OT	Connell	N/A	Boston Arena	12–2–2	26
17	January 8	Ottawa	2–0	Canadiens		Connell	N/A	Montreal Forum	13–2–2	28
18	January 11	Toronto	1–4	Ottawa		Connell	N/A	Ottawa Auditorium	14–2–2	30
19	January 13	Ottawa	3–1	Pittsburgh		Connell	N/A	Duquesne Garden	15–2–2	32
20	January 15	Boston	4–5	Ottawa		Connell	N/A	Ottawa Auditorium	16–2–2	34
21	January 18	Pittsburgh	6–1	Ottawa		Connell	N/A	Ottawa Auditorium	16–3–2	34
22	January 22	Maroons	0–1	Ottawa		Connell	N/A	Ottawa Auditorium	17–3–2	36
23	January 25	Ottawa	1–6	Americans		Connell	N/A	Madison Square Garden	17–4–2	36
24	January 27	Detroit	1–3	Ottawa		Connell	N/A	Ottawa Auditorium	18–4–2	38
25	January 29	Ottawa	0–0	Maroons	OT	Connell	N/A	Montreal Forum	18–4–3	39

February: 6–3–1 (home: 3–0–1; road: 3–3–0)

Game	Date	Visitor	Score	Home	OT	Decision	Attendance	Arena	Record	Pts
26	February 1	Americans	4–2	Ottawa		Connell	N/A	Ottawa Auditorium	18–5–3	39
27	February 5	Chicago	1–2	Ottawa		Connell	N/A	Ottawa Auditorium	19–5–3	41
28	February 9	Ottawa	3–5	Chicago		Connell	N/A	Chicago Coliseum	19–6–3	41
29	February 12	Ottawa	1–0	Toronto		Connell	N/A	Mutual Street Arena	20–6–3	43
30	February 15	Rangers	2–2	Ottawa	OT	Connell	N/A	Ottawa Auditorium	20–6–4	44
31	February 17	Ottawa	2–1	Detroit		Connell	N/A	Border Cities Arena	21–6–4	46
32	February 19	Pittsburgh	0–1	Ottawa		Connell	N/A	Ottawa Auditorium	22–6–4	48
33	February 22	Canadiens	1–2	Ottawa	OT	Connell	N/A	Ottawa Auditorium	23–6–4	50
34	February 24	Ottawa	1–0	Rangers		Connell	N/A	Madison Square Garden	24–6–4	52
35	February 26	Ottawa	2–3	Americans	OT	Connell	N/A	Madison Square Garden	24–7–4	52

March: 6–3–0 (home: 3–2–0; road: 3–1–0)

Game	Date	Visitor	Score	Home	OT	Decision	Attendance	Arena	Record	Pts
36	March 3	Ottawa	2–1	Pittsburgh		Connell	N/A	Duquesne Garden	25–7–4	54
37	March 5	Chicago	2–1	Ottawa	OT	Connell	N/A	Ottawa Auditorium	25–8–4	54
38	March 10	Maroons	1–0	Ottawa		Connell	N/A	Ottawa Auditorium	25–9–4	54
39	March 12	Americans	3–4	Ottawa		Connell	N/A	Ottawa Auditorium	26–9–4	56
40	March 15	Ottawa	1–4	Canadiens		Connell	N/A	Montreal Forum	26–10–4	56
41	March 17	Boston	0–1	Ottawa		Connell	N/A	Ottawa Auditorium	27–10–4	58
42	March 19	Ottawa	2–0	Toronto		Connell	N/A	Mutual Street Arena	28–10–4	60
43	March 24	Toronto	0–4	Ottawa		Connell	N/A	Ottawa Auditorium	29–10–4	62
44	March 26	Ottawa	3–2	Maroons		Connell	N/A	Montreal Forum	30–10–4	64

Legend: Win (2 points) Loss (0 points) Tie (1 point)

=== Playoffs ===
1927 Stanley Cup playoffs
Semifinals vs. (C2) Montreal Canadiens – Senators win 5 goals to 1 goal

Game	Date	Visitor	Score	Home	OT	Decision	Attendance	Arena	Series
1	April 2	Ottawa	4–0	Canadiens		Connell	N/A	Montreal Forum	4–0
2	April 4	Canadiens	1–1	Ottawa		Connell	N/A	Ottawa Auditorium	5–1

Stanley Cup Finals vs. (A2) Boston Bruins – Senators win 2–0–2

Game	Date	Visitor	Score	Home	OT	Decision	Attendance	Arena	Series
1	April 7	Ottawa	0–0	Boston		Connell	N/A	Boston Arena	0–0–1
2	April 9	Ottawa	3–1	Boston		Connell	N/A	Boston Arena	1–0–1
3	April 11	Boston	1–1	Ottawa		Connell	N/A	Ottawa Auditorium	1–0–2
4	April 13	Boston	1–3	Ottawa		Connell	N/A	Ottawa Auditorium	2–0–2

Legend: Win Loss Tie

== Player statistics ==
=== Regular season ===
Scoring

Player	GP	G	A	Pts	PIM
Cy Denneny	42	17	6	23	16
King Clancy	43	9	10	19	78
Hec Kilrea	42	11	7	18	48
Frank Finnigan	36	15	1	16	52
Hooley Smith	43	9	6	15	125
Frank Nighbor	38	6	6	12	26
Georges Boucher	40	8	3	11	115
Jack Adams	40	5	1	6	66
Alex Smith	42	4	1	5	58
Ed Gorman	41	1	0	1	17
Milt Halliday	38	1	0	1	2
Alec Connell	44	0	0	0	2
Stan Jackson	8	0	0	0	2

Goaltending

Player	MIN	GP	W	L	T	GA	GAA	SA	SV	SV%	SO
Alec Connell	2782	44	30	10	4	69	1.49				13
Team:	2782	44	30	10	4	69	1.49				13

=== Playoffs ===
Scoring

Player	GP	G	A	Pts	PIM
Cy Denneny	6	5	0	5	0
Frank Finnigan	6	3	0	3	0
King Clancy	6	1	1	2	14
Hec Kilrea	6	1	1	2	4
Frank Nighbor	6	1	1	2	0
Hooley Smith	6	1	0	1	16
Jack Adams	6	0	0	0	0
Georges Boucher	6	0	0	0	43
Alec Connell	6	0	0	0	0
Ed Gorman	6	0	0	0	0
Milt Halliday	6	0	0	0	0
Alex Smith	6	0	0	0	8

Goaltending

Player	MIN	GP	W	L	T	GA	GAA	SA	SV	SV%	SO
Alec Connell	400	6	3	0	3	4	0.60				2
Team:	400	6	3	0	3	4	0.60				2

Note:

Pos = Position;GP = Games played; G = Goals; A = Assists; Pts = Points; PIM = Penalty minutes; +/- = Plus/minus; PPG = Power-play goals; SHG = Short-handed goals; GWG = Game-winning goals
Pos = Position;GP = Games played; Min, TOI = Minutes played; W = Wins; L = Losses; T,T/OT = Ties; OTL = Overtime losses; GA = Goals-against; GAA = Goals-against average; SO = Shutouts; SA = Shots against; SV = Shots saved;SV% = Save percentage;

== Awards and records ==
- O'Brien Cup
- Prince of Wales Trophy
- Stanley Cup

== Transactions ==
The Senators were involved in the following transactions during the 1926–27 season.

=== Trades ===
August 1, 1926	To Ottawa Senators Jack Adams	To Toronto St. Patricks Clint Benedict; Cash
January 18, 1927	To Ottawa Senators Stan Jackson	To Boston Bruins Cash
February 1, 1927	To Ottawa Senators Cash	To London Panthers (Can-Pro) Stan Jackson

=== Free agents signed ===
October 24, 1926	From Ottawa Gunners (OCHL) Milt Halliday

=== Free agents lost ===
November 10, 1926	To Saskatoon Sheiks (PrHL) Harry Helman

== See also ==
- 1926–27 NHL season
- List of Stanley Cup champions
