= 1927 Stanley Cup Final =

1927 ice hockey championship series

	1	2	3	4	Total
Ottawa Senators	0*	3	1**	3	2
Boston Bruins	0*	1	1**	1	0
- * indicates (10-minute) periods of overtime. Teams played to two wins, ignoring ties.
- Location(s): Boston: Boston Arena (1, 2); Ottawa: Ottawa Auditorium (3, 4)
- Format: best-of-three
- Coaches: Ottawa: Dave Gill; Boston: Art Ross
- Captains: Ottawa: George Boucher; Boston: Sprague Cleghorn
- Dates: April 4–13, 1927
- Series-winning goal: Cy Denneny (7:30, second)
- Hall of Famers: Senators: Jack Adams (1959); Georges Boucher (1960); King Clancy (1958); Alec Connell (1958); Cy Denneny (1959); Frank Nighbor (1947); Hooley Smith (1972); Bruins: Sprague Cleghorn (1958); Frank Fredrickson (1958); Harry Oliver (1967); Eddie Shore (1947); Coaches: Art Ross (1949, player)

The 1927 Stanley Cup Final was played by the Ottawa Senators and the Boston Bruins. It was the first time the Cup was solely contested by National Hockey League teams, owing to the demise of the Western Hockey League the previous year. It was won by the Ottawa Senators, coached by Dave Gill, over the Boston Bruins, coached by Art Ross. This was the Senators' fourth win since 1920, and eleventh overall, but it marked the end of the dynasty. The original Senators would not win another.

It would be the last time a team from Ottawa would play in the Final until the 2007 Stanley Cup Final, and the first Stanley Cup Final to have games played in both Canada and the United States.

== Game summaries ==
The Stanley Cup Final was originally intended to be a best-of-three series. After the first game was declared a draw, NHL president Frank Calder ruled that the series would go no more than five games, with overtimes limited to 20 minutes. If the teams were tied after five games, the teams would share the championship. In the end, the series went four games because of two ties. These were the last ties in Stanley Cup history, notwithstanding the unfinished 3–3 Stanley Cup Final match between Edmonton and Boston on May 24, 1988. Ottawa's Frank Nighbor was playing in his sixth Stanley Cup series, while Boston's Sprague Cleghorn and Billy Coutu were playing in their fifth Stanley Cup series.

Rough play marred the series: in the final game, Lionel Hitchman and George Boucher were ejected for a wild fight which Ottawa police had to break up. Hooley Smith butt-ended Boston's Harry Oliver, and Eddie Shore fought with Smith in retaliation; both Smith and Shore were ejected. After the game, Billy Coutu assaulted referee Jerry Laflamme, tackled referee Billy Bell and started a bench-clearing brawl. Coutu was barred from the league for life, Smith was given a one-month suspension effective in the 1927–28 season, while Boucher, Hitchman and Jimmy Herbert were all fined.

The April 13, 1927, game at the Ottawa Auditorium was the last Stanley Cup Final game in Ottawa until Game 3 of the 2007 Stanley Cup Final, which was played at Scotiabank Place between the current Senators and the Anaheim Ducks on June 2, 2007. It is known that one fan, Russell Williams, attended both games, 80 years apart, with Ottawa winning both.

=== Game one ===
April 7	Ottawa Senators	0–0	OT	Boston Bruins	Boston Arena	Recap
No scoring		First period		No scoring
No scoring		Second period		No scoring
No scoring		Third period		No scoring
No scoring		First overtime period		No scoring
Alec Connell		Goalie stats		Hal Winkler

The first game ended in a scoreless draw after two ten-minute overtime periods. In the overtime, the condition of the ice became unplayable and NHL President Frank Calder called the game. There were two disallowed goals, one by each team, and both disallowed by off-sides.

Before the next game, Calder decided that the series would play to five games if necessary. If after the five games, the teams were tied, that the teams would share the Stanley Cup honours. Calder also ruled that overtimes would be limited to 20 minutes.

=== Game two ===
April 9	Ottawa Senators	3–1	Boston Bruins	Boston Arena	Recap
No scoring		First period	King Clancy (1) - 6:37; Frank Finnigan (2) - 11:23
No scoring		Second period	No scoring
16:45 - Harry Oliver (3)		Third period	Cy Denneny (2) - 19:55
Alec Connell		Goalie stats	Hal Winkler

In the second game, the Senators changed their tactics, going on the offensive. King Clancy and Cy Denneny scored in the first period for Ottawa. The Senators played a defensive game in the second period. In the third period, Harry Oliver scored for the Bruins on a goal-mouth scramble to bring the Bruins within one. In the final minute, with the Bruins pressing, Denneny scored again to put the game beyond doubt.

=== Game three ===
April 11	Boston Bruins	1–1	2OT	Ottawa Senators	Ottawa Auditorium	Recap
Jimmy Herberts (3) - 7:00		First period		No scoring
No scoring		Second period		15:00 - Cy Denneny (3)
No scoring		Third period		No scoring
No scoring		Second overtime period		No scoring
Hal Winkler		Goalie stats		Alec Connell

The series switched to Ottawa. The Bruins took the early lead. Jimmy "Sailor" Herbert broke in on a pass from Harry Oliver and beat Alex Connell in the Ottawa net at 7:14 of the first period. In the second, the Senators picked up the pace and Denneny scored at 15:15 on a pass from Clancy to tie the score. Neither team could break the tie in the third period or the two overtimes. The result meant that Ottawa could win the series with a win in game four, making game five unnecessary.

=== Game four ===
April 13	Boston Bruins	1–3	Ottawa Senators	Ottawa Auditorium	Recap
No scoring		First period	No scoring
No scoring		Second period	5:00 - Frank Finnigan (3); 7:30 - Cy Denneny (4)
Harry Oliver (4) - 17:50		Third period	11:00 - Cy Denneny (5)
Hal Winkler		Goalie stats	Alec Connell

The Senators decided to start two players who had been substitutes in the previous games, Frank Finnigan and Hec Kilrea and the moves were a success. The Senators came out on the offensive and took a 2–0 lead in the first period on goals by Finnigan and Denneny. Denneny scored again in the third period to put the Senators ahead 3–0. The game degenerated after that. Lionel Hitchman and George Boucher fought, with Eddie Shore jumping in. Ottawa police jumped onto the ice to help the referees and Hitchman and Boucher were ejected. Oliver scored with six minutes to play. Ottawa's Hooley Smith butt-ended Oliver in the face with a minute to play. Shore jumped in to fight Smith and the two were ejected. After the game Coutu attacked referee Laflamme on his way to the dressing room.

== Stanley Cup engraving ==
The 1927 Stanley Cup was presented to Senators captain George Boucher by NHL President Frank Calder following the Senators 3–1 win over the Bruins in game four.

The following Senators players and staff had their names engraved on the Stanley Cup

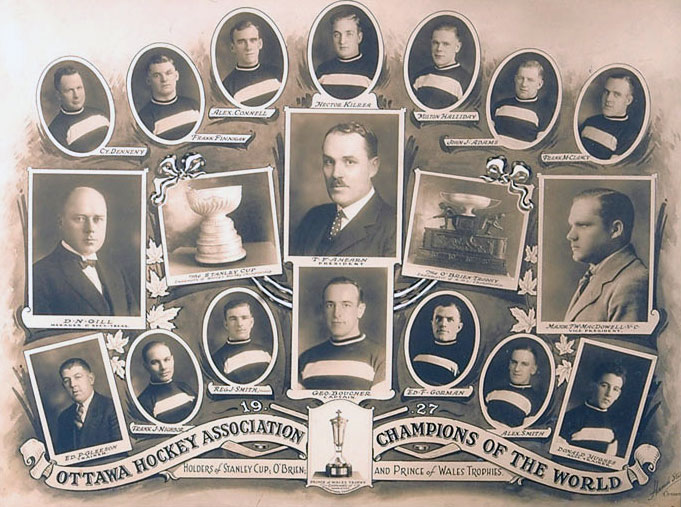
Team photograph. Trophies won: Stanley Cup, O'Brien Cup, Prince of Wales Trophy.

With the win Hooley Smith became the fourth player to have won Olympic gold and the Stanley Cup. Smith had won the gold medal at the 1924 Olympics with the Toronto Granites.

1926–27 Ottawa Senators

=== Players ===
Centres

- 6 Frank Nighbor
- 11 Jack Adams

Wingers

- 5 Cy Denneny
- 7 Reginald Hooley Smith
- 8 Frank Finnigan
- 10 Hec Kilrea

Defencemen

- 3 George Buck Boucher (Captain)
- 4 Alex Smith
- 9 Frank King Clancy
- 2 Edwin Gorman
- 14 Milt Halliday

Goaltenders

- 1 Alex Connell

=== Coaching and administrative staff ===
- Frank Ahearn (President/Owner)
- Major T. W. McDonald (Vice President)
- Dave Gill (Manager-Coach/Secretary-Treasurer)
- Ed Gleeson (Trainer), Don Hughes (Asst. Trainer)

Dave Gill was the third NHL rookie coach to win the Stanley Cup. Major T. W. McDonald's first name is unknown.

== See also ==
- 1926–27 NHL season

Preceded by Montreal Maroons; 1926	Ottawa Senators; Stanley Cup champions 1927	Succeeded by New York Rangers; 1928
