= Charles Cahill =

Charles Cahill may refer to:

- Charles Cahill (ice hockey) (1904–1954), Canadian ice hockey player
- Charles Cahill (rugby league) (1916–2007), Australian rugby league footballer and coach
