= 1926–27 Boston Bruins season =

NHL team season

1926–27 Boston Bruins
- Division: 2nd American
- 1926–27 record: 21–20–3 (45 points)
- Home record: 15–7–0
- Road record: 6–13–3
- Goals for: 97
- Goals against: 89

Team information
- General manager: Art Ross
- Coach: Art Ross
- Captain: Sprague Cleghorn
- Arena: Boston Arena
- Average attendance: 6,045

Team leaders
- Goals: Harry Oliver (18 goals)
- Assists: Percy Galbraith (8 assists)
- Points: Harry Oliver (24 points)
- Penalty minutes: Eddie Shore (130)
- Wins: Hal Winkler (12)
- Goals against average: Hal Winkler (1.66)

The 1926–27 Boston Bruins season was the team's 3rd season in the NHL. The Bruins finished 2nd place in the American Division, making the playoffs for the 1st time in franchise history. The team competed in the first Stanley Cup finals to be held exclusively between NHL teams, losing to the Ottawa Senators.

== Offseason ==
The collapse of the Western Hockey League not only placed the Stanley Cup in the exclusive control of the NHL, but also resulted in a flood of skilled players bolstering NHL rosters, allowing not only for three new expansion franchises (the New York Rangers, the Chicago Black Hawks and the Detroit Cougars) but providing the Bruins a complete overhaul of their roster. Goaltender Hal Winkler came from the Calgary Tigers and replaced holdover Doc Stewart in net, while former Calgary scoring star Harry Oliver led the Bruins in scoring. From the Edmonton Eskimos came two players: star scorer Duke Keats and the real prize of the offseason, defenseman Eddie Shore, who in a Bruins' uniform became one of the great players in hockey history. Another find was Percy Galbraith, who joined the Bruins after a long career in the senior leagues.

With ten teams, the NHL realigned into two divisions, placing the Bruins in the new American Division with the Black Hawks, the Cougars, the Rangers and the Pittsburgh Pirates.

== Regular season ==
Shore made an impact early, both as a rushing defenseman and as an enforcer, provoking the ire of the Montreal Maroons in a December 23 game in which he and Sprague Cleghorn both slashed repeatedly at Maroons' star Nels Stewart, much to the disgust of the Maroons' team owner, who after the game blasted the referee in the newspapers as "incompetent." At the halfway point of the season, the Bruins were in third place behind Chicago.

Despite performances such as Oliver's four goal night against the Black Hawks on January 11, the club executed a major overhaul in mid January, first dealing Carson Cooper to the Canadiens for Billy Boucher and purchasing Hal Winkler from the Rangers, and then trading Duke Keats, who seemed to have faded, for Frank Fredrickson at month's end. Fredrickson and Winkler paid immediate dividends, with the Icelander scoring four goals against the Rangers in his first game in a Boston uniform and Winkler supplanting Doc Stewart as the club's starting goaltender. Nonetheless, the Bruins still relied heavily on rough play, and Cleghorn and Couto were specifically cited by Toronto Maple Leafs governor Charlie Querrie, when he resigned in February, as being "only good for chopping and slashing."

Inconsistent play marred the end of the regular season, with the Bruins losing four out of their last seven matches, but they did well enough to secure their first playoff berth. With a combined 31 points between Detroit and Boston, Fredrickson finished fourth in the NHL in scoring with Oliver placing ninth, and Winkler had the fifth lowest goals against average of the league's goaltenders. Eddie Shore finished only three behind Nels Stewart as the league's most penalized player.

Numerous bonuses were given out at season's end to the team's players: $1,600 to Galbraith; $1,400 to Hitchman; $1,000 each to Shore, Oliver, Herbert and Cleghorn; $850 to Winkler; $750 to Fredrickson; $700 to Coutu; $300 each to Stuart and Boucher; and $250 each to Meeking and the team's trainer.

=== Final standings ===
American Division
	GP	W	L	T	GF	GA	Pts
**New York Rangers**	44	25	13	6	95	72	56
**Boston Bruins**	44	21	20	3	97	89	45
**Chicago Black Hawks**	44	19	22	3	115	116	41
Pittsburgh Pirates	44	15	26	3	79	108	33
Detroit Cougars	44	12	28	4	76	105	28

Note: GP = Games Played, W = Wins, L = Losses, T = Ties, Pts = Points, GF = Goals For, GA = Goals Against
Teams that qualified for the playoffs are highlighted in bold.

=== Record vs. opponents ===
==== Vs. American Division ====
1926–27 NHL records
Team	BOS	CHI	DET	NYR	PIT	Total
Boston	—	3–2–1	5–1	2–3–1	4–2	**14–8–2**
Chicago	2–3–1	—	3–2–1	2–4	2–4	**9–13–2**
Detroit	1–5	2–3–1	—	1–3–2	2–4	**6–15–3**
N.Y. Rangers	3–2–1	4–2	3–1–2	—	5–1	**15–6–3**
Pittsburgh	2–4	4–2	4–2	1–5	—	**11–13–0**

==== Vs. Canadian Division ====
1926–27 NHL records
Team	MTL	MTM	NYA	OTT	TOR	Total
Boston	1–2–1	2–2	2–2	1–3	1–3	**7–12–1**
Chicago	2–2	2–2	2–1–1	2–2	2–2	**10–9–1**
Detroit	0–4	1–3	3–1	1–3	1–2–1	**6–13–1**
N.Y. Rangers	3–1	2–1–1	3–1	0–3–1	2–1–1	**10–7–3**
Pittsburgh	0–3–1	2–1–1	0–4	1–3	1–2–1	**4–13–3**

== Schedule and results ==
1926–27 regular season
November

Game	Result	Date	Score	Opponent	Record
1	W	November 16, 1926	4–1	Montreal Canadiens (1926–27)	1–0–0
2	W	November 18, 1926	2–0	@ Detroit Cougars (1926–27)	2–0–0
3	L	November 20, 1926	1–5	@ Chicago Black Hawks (1926–27)	2–1–0
4	L	November 23, 1926	1–2	Montreal Maroons (1926–27)	2–2–0
5	L	November 30, 1926	1–2	Ottawa Senators (1926–27)	2–3–0

December

Game	Result	Date	Score	Opponent	Record
6	W	December 4, 1926	4–3 OT	@ Pittsburgh Pirates (1926–27)	3–3–0
7	L	December 7, 1926	0–1	New York Rangers (1926–27)	3–4–0
8	L	December 12, 1926	1–2 OT	@ New York Rangers (1926–27)	3–5–0
9	W	December 14, 1926	7–2	Detroit Cougars (1926–27)	4–5–0
10	T	December 16, 1926	2–2 OT	@ Montreal Canadiens (1926–27)	4–5–1
11	W	December 18, 1926	3–0	Pittsburgh Pirates (1926–27)	5–5–1
12	L	December 21, 1926	3–5	Toronto Maple Leafs (1926–27)	5–6–1
13	W	December 23, 1926	2–1	@ Montreal Maroons (1926–27)	6–6–1
14	W	December 28, 1926	2–1	New York Americans (1926–27)	7–6–1
15	L	December 30, 1926	1–4	@ Toronto Maple Leafs (1926–27)	7–7–1

January

Game	Result	Date	Score	Opponent	Record
16	L	January 2, 1927	0–3	@ New York Americans (1926–27)	7–8–1
17	W	January 4, 1927	2–1 OT	Ottawa Senators (1926–27)	8–8–1
18	L	January 8, 1927	0–3	Montreal Maroons (1926–27)	8–9–1
19	W	January 11, 1927	6–3	Chicago Black Hawks (1926–27)	9–9–1
20	L	January 13, 1927	2–3	@ Detroit Cougars (1926–27)	9–10–1
21	L	January 15, 1927	4–5	@ Ottawa Senators (1926–27)	9–11–1
22	W	January 18, 1927	7–3	New York Rangers (1926–27)	10–11–1
23	T	January 20, 1927	2–2 OT	@ New York Rangers (1926–27)	10–11–2
24	T	January 22, 1927	2–2 OT	@ Chicago Black Hawks (1926–27)	10–11–3
25	W	January 25, 1927	3–1	Pittsburgh Pirates (1926–27)	11–11–3
26	L	January 29, 1927	0–2	@ Pittsburgh Pirates (1926–27)	11–12–3

February

Game	Result	Date	Score	Opponent	Record
27	W	February 1, 1927	1–0	Toronto Maple Leafs (1926–27)	12–12–3
28	L	February 5, 1927	0–1	@ Toronto Maple Leafs (1926–27)	12–13–3
29	W	February 8, 1927	2–0	Detroit Cougars (1926–27)	13–13–3
30	W	February 12, 1927	3–2	@ Montreal Maroons (1926–27)	14–13–3
31	W	February 15, 1927	3–0	Chicago Black Hawks (1926–27)	15–13–3
32	L	February 20, 1927	1–3	@ New York Rangers (1926–27)	15–14–3
33	W	February 22, 1927	3–2	Detroit Cougars (1926–27)	16–14–3
34	L	February 26, 1927	0–2	@ Montreal Canadiens (1926–27)	16–15–3

March

Game	Result	Date	Score	Opponent	Record
35	L	March 1, 1927	0–3	@ New York Americans (1926–27)	16–16–3
36	W	March 5, 1927	5–0	New York Americans (1926–27)	17–16–3
37	W	March 8, 1927	5–2	Pittsburgh Pirates (1926–27)	18–16–3
38	L	March 13, 1927	0–4	Chicago Black Hawks (1926–27)	18–17–3
39	W	March 15, 1927	2–1 OT	@ Chicago Black Hawks (1926–27)	19–17–3
40	L	March 17, 1927	0–1	@ Ottawa Senators (1926–27)	19–18–3
41	W	March 19, 1927	3–1	@ Detroit Cougars (1926–27)	20–18–3
42	L	March 22, 1927	0–1	Montreal Canadiens (1926–27)	20–19–3
43	L	March 24, 1927	3–4	@ Pittsburgh Pirates (1926–27)	20–20–3
44	W	March 26, 1927	4–3 OT	New York Rangers (1926–27)	21–20–3

Legend: Win (2 points) Loss (0 points) Tie (1 point)

== Playoffs ==
The Bruins beat the Black Hawks on March 29 (in a game played in New York) 6–1, and tied 4–4 in Boston on the 31st, to win the two-game total-goal series ten goals to five.

Their second series against the Rangers was also a two-game total-goal series, where they played to a scoreless tie in Boston on April 2 and won 3–1 on the 4th in New York to win three goals to one.

The Stanley Cup finals, a best-of-five series, began in Boston on April 7, where the Bruins and Senators skated to a scoreless tie. Galbraith scored for Boston in the overtime, but the goal was ruled offside. The second game in Boston on the 9th was won by Ottawa 3–1, as Boston allowed two shorthanded goals in a game marred by five power plays on Shore penalties alone.

On April 11, the series moved to Ottawa, and the teams played to another tie, 1–1. The final game was on April 13, won 3–1 by Ottawa, in a match marked by numerous fights in which several players received match penalties, fines and suspensions, and league President Frank Calder was summoned to the ice to sort it all out. The most egregious act was Bruin Billy Coutu attacking the referee, for which he was the first NHL player to be expelled for life from the league. Bruins Lionel Hitchman and Jimmy Herbert were also fined. Money collected from the fines were distributed to Boston and Ottawa charities.

The Stanley Cup win was the eleventh and final one for the original Ottawa Senators.

== Player statistics ==
=== Regular season ===
Scoring

Player	Pos	GP	G	A	Pts	PIM
Harry Oliver	RW	42	18	6	24	17
Jimmy Herbert	C/RW	34	15	7	22	51
Frank Fredrickson	C	28	14	7	21	33
Eddie Shore	D	40	12	6	18	130
Percy Galbraith	LW/D	42	9	8	17	26
Duke Keats	C	17	4	7	11	20
Lionel Hitchman	D	41	3	6	9	70
Sprague Cleghorn	D	44	7	1	8	84
Billy Stuart	D	43	3	1	4	20
Archie Briden	LW	16	2	2	4	8
Billy Boucher	RW	14	2	0	2	12
Billy Coutu	D	40	1	1	2	35
Harry Meeking	LW	23	1	0	1	2
Charles Cahill	RW	1	0	0	0	0
Carson Cooper	RW	10	0	0	0	0
Charles Stewart	G	21	0	0	0	0
Hal Winkler	G	23	0	0	0	0

Goaltending

Player	MIN	GP	W	L	T	GA	GAA	SO
Hal Winkler	1445	23	12	9	2	40	1.66	4
Charles Stewart	1303	21	9	11	1	49	2.26	2
Team:	2748	44	21	20	3	89	1.94	6

=== Playoffs ===
Scoring

Player	Pos	GP	G	A	Pts	PIM
Harry Oliver	RW	8	4	2	6	4
Percy Galbraith	LW/D	8	3	3	6	2
Frank Fredrickson	C	8	2	2	4	20
Jimmy Herbert	C/RW	8	3	0	3	8
Eddie Shore	D	8	1	1	2	40
Sprague Cleghorn	D	8	1	0	1	8
Billy Coutu	D	7	1	0	1	4
Lionel Hitchman	D	8	1	0	1	31
Billy Boucher	RW	8	0	0	0	2
Harry Meeking	LW	7	0	0	0	0
Billy Stuart	D	8	0	0	0	6
Hal Winkler	G	8	0	0	0	0

Goaltending

Player	MIN	GP	W	L	GA	GAA	SO
Hal Winkler	520	8	2	2	13	1.50	2
Team:	520	8	2	2	13	1.50	2

Note:

Pos = Position;GP = Games played; G = Goals; A = Assists; Pts = Points; PIM = Penalty minutes; +/- = Plus/minus; PPG = Power-play goals; SHG = Short-handed goals; GWG = Game-winning goals
Pos = Position;GP = Games played; Min, TOI = Minutes played; W = Wins; L = Losses; T,T/OT = Ties; OTL = Overtime losses; GA = Goals-against; GAA = Goals-against average; SO = Shutouts; SA = Shots against; SV = Shots saved;SV% = Save percentage;

== Transactions ==
- Acquired Eddie Shore, Harry Oliver, Hal Winkler, Duke Keats and Archie Briden as free agents from the Western Hockey League.
- Traded Carson Cooper to the Montreal Canadiens for Billy Boucher, January 17, 1927.
- Purchased Hal Winkler from the New York Rangers for $5,000, January 17, 1927.
- Traded Duke Keats and Archie Briden to the Detroit Cougars for Frank Frederickson and Harry Meeking, January 27, 1927.
