= 1926–27 Pittsburgh Pirates (NHL) season =

National Hockey League team season

1926–27 Pittsburgh Pirates
- Division: 4th American
- 1926–27 record: 15–26–3
- Home record: 8–12–2
- Road record: 7–14–1
- Goals for: 79
- Goals against: 108

Team information
- Coach: Odie Cleghorn
- Captain: Harold Cotton
- Arena: Duquesne Garden

Team leaders
- Goals: Hib Milks (16)
- Assists: Ty Arbour (8)
- Points: Hib Milks (22)
- Penalty minutes: Herb Drury (48)
- Wins: Roy Worters (15)
- Goals against average: Roy Worters (2.39)

The 1926–27 Pittsburgh Pirates season was the second season of the Pirates ice hockey team in the National Hockey League (NHL). The Pirates did not qualify for the playoffs.

== Regular season ==
=== Final standings ===
American Division
	GP	W	L	T	GF	GA	Pts
**New York Rangers**	44	25	13	6	95	72	56
**Boston Bruins**	44	21	20	3	97	89	45
**Chicago Black Hawks**	44	19	22	3	115	116	41
Pittsburgh Pirates	44	15	26	3	79	108	33
Detroit Cougars	44	12	28	4	76	105	28

Note: GP = Games Played, W = Wins, L = Losses, T = Ties, Pts = Points, GF = Goals For, GA = Goals Against
Teams that qualified for the playoffs are highlighted in bold.

=== Record vs. opponents ===
==== Vs. American Division ====
1926–27 NHL records
Team	**BOS**	**CHI**	**DET**	**NYR**	**PIT**	**Total**
Boston	—	3–2–1	5–1	2–3–1	4–2	**14–8–2**
Chicago	2–3–1	—	3–2–1	2–4	2–4	**9–13–2**
Detroit	1–5	2–3–1	—	1–3–2	2–4	**6–15–3**
N.Y. Rangers	3–2–1	4–2	3–1–2	—	5–1	**15–6–3**
Pittsburgh	2–4	4–2	4–2	1–5	—	**11–13–0**

==== Vs. Canadian Division ====
1926–27 NHL records
Team	**MTL**	**MTM**	**NYA**	**OTT**	**TOR**	**Total**
Boston	1–2–1	2–2	2–2	1–3	1–3	**7–12–1**
Chicago	2–2	2–2	2–1–1	2–2	2–2	**10–9–1**
Detroit	0–4	1–3	3–1	1–3	1–2–1	**6–13–1**
N.Y. Rangers	3–1	2–1–1	3–1	0–3–1	2–1–1	**10–7–3**
Pittsburgh	0–3–1	2–1–1	0–4	1–3	1–2–1	**4–13–3**

== Schedule and results ==
1926–27 regular season
November

Game	Result	Date	Score	Opponent	Record
1	L	November 16, 1926	0–1	New York Americans (1926–27)	0–1–0
2	W	November 20, 1926	4–1	Detroit Cougars (1926–27)	1–1–0
3	W	November 25, 1926	2–0	New York Rangers (1926–27)	2–1–0
4	W	November 27, 1926	5–3	@ Chicago Black Hawks (1926–27)	3–1–0
5	L	November 30, 1926	0–6	@ Toronto Maple Leafs (1926–27)	3–2–0

December

Game	Result	Date	Score	Opponent	Record
6	L	December 4, 1926	3–4 OT	Boston Bruins (1926–27)	3–3–0
7	L	December 9, 1926	2–5	Montreal Canadiens (1926–27)	3–4–0
8	T	December 11, 1926	2–2 OT	Montreal Maroons (1926–27)	3–4–1
9	L	December 18, 1926	0–3	@ Boston Bruins (1926–27)	3–5–1
10	L	December 21, 1926	0–1	@ New York Rangers (1926–27)	3–6–1
11	L	December 23, 1926	0–2	@ New York Americans (1926–27)	3–7–1
12	W	December 25, 1926	3–2	Toronto Maple Leafs (1926–27)	4–7–1
13	L	December 30, 1926	0–1	@ Montreal Canadiens (1926–27)	4–8–1

January

Game	Result	Date	Score	Opponent	Record
14	W	January 1, 1927	3–2	@ Detroit Cougars (1926–27)	5–8–1
15	W	January 4, 1927	2–1	@ Chicago Black Hawks (1926–27)	6–8–1
16	L	January 6, 1927	1–3	Detroit Cougars (1926–27)	6–9–1
17	L	January 8, 1927	0–4	Chicago Black Hawks (1926–27)	6–10–1
18	L	January 13, 1927	1–3	Ottawa Senators (1926–27)	6–11–1
19	L	January 15, 1927	1–2	New York Americans (1926–27)	6–12–1
20	W	January 18, 1927	6–1	@ Ottawa Senators (1926–27)	7–12–1
21	W	January 20, 1927	3–1	@ Montreal Maroons (1926–27)	8–12–1
22	W	January 22, 1927	1–0 OT	Detroit Cougars (1926–27)	9–12–1
23	L	January 25, 1927	1–3	@ Boston Bruins (1926–27)	9–13–1
24	W	January 27, 1927	4–2	Chicago Black Hawks (1926–27)	10–13–1
25	W	January 29, 1927	2–0	Boston Bruins (1926–27)	11–13–1

February

Game	Result	Date	Score	Opponent	Record
26	L	February 6, 1927	1–2	@ New York Rangers (1926–27)	11–14–1
27	L	February 8, 1927	0–5	@ New York Americans (1926–27)	11–15–1
28	L	February 10, 1927	0–1	Montreal Maroons (1926–27)	11–16–1
29	L	February 12, 1927	2–3 OT	New York Rangers (1926–27)	11–17–1
30	T	February 15, 1927	1–1 OT	@ Montreal Canadiens (1926–27)	11–17–2
31	L	February 19, 1927	0–1	@ Ottawa Senators (1926–27)	11–18–2
32	W	February 22, 1927	3–0	@ Montreal Maroons (1926–27)	12–18–2
33	T	February 26, 1927	1–1 OT	Toronto Maple Leafs (1926–27)	12–18–3

March

Game	Result	Date	Score	Opponent	Record
34	L	March 1, 1927	1–4	@ Toronto Maple Leafs (1926–27)	12–19–3
35	L	March 3, 1927	1–2	Ottawa Senators (1926–27)	12–20–3
36	L	March 5, 1927	1–2	Montreal Canadiens (1926–27)	12–21–3
37	L	March 8, 1927	2–5	@ Boston Bruins (1926–27)	12–22–3
38	L	March 10, 1927	1–7	@ Detroit Cougars (1926–27)	12–23–3
39	L	March 15, 1927	0–5	New York Rangers (1926–27)	12–24–3
40	W	March 17, 1927	6–2	Chicago Black Hawks (1926–27)	13–24–3
41	L	March 19, 1927	2–3 OT	@ Chicago Black Hawks (1926–27)	13–25–3
42	L	March 22, 1927	1–4	@ New York Rangers (1926–27)	13–26–3
43	W	March 24, 1927	4–3	Boston Bruins (1926–27)	14–26–3
44	W	March 26, 1927	6–4 OT	@ Detroit Cougars (1926–27)	15–26–3

Legend: Win (2 points) Loss (0 points) Tie (1 point)

== Player statistics ==
=== Regular season ===
Scoring

Player	Pos	GP	G	A	Pts	PIM
Hib Milks	LW/C	44	16	6	22	18
Harold Darragh	LW	42	12	3	15	4
Ty Arbour	LW	41	7	8	15	10
Johnny McKinnon	D	44	13	0	13	21
Tex White	RW	43	5	4	9	21
Herb Drury	D/RW	42	5	1	6	48
Charlie Langlois	RW/D	36	5	1	6	36
Duke McCurry	LW	33	3	3	6	23
Baldy Cotton	LW	37	5	0	5	17
Rodger Smith	D	36	4	0	4	6
Mickey McGuire	LW	32	3	0	3	6
Odie Cleghorn	RW/C	3	0	0	0	0
Lionel Conacher	D	9	0	0	0	12
Roy Worters	G	44	0	0	0	0

Goaltending

Player	MIN	GP	W	L	T	GA	GAA	SO
Roy Worters	2711	44	15	26	3	108	2.39	4
Team:	2711	44	15	26	3	108	2.39	4

Note: GP = Games played; G = Goals; A = Assists; Pts = Points; +/- = Plus/Minus; PIM = Penalty Minutes; PPG=Power-play goals; SHG=Short-handed goals; GWG=Game-winning goals
MIN=Minutes played; W = Wins; L = Losses; T = Ties; GA = Goals against; GAA = Goals against average; SO = Shutouts;

== See also ==
- 1926–27 NHL season
