= Carson Cooper =

Canadian ice hockey player

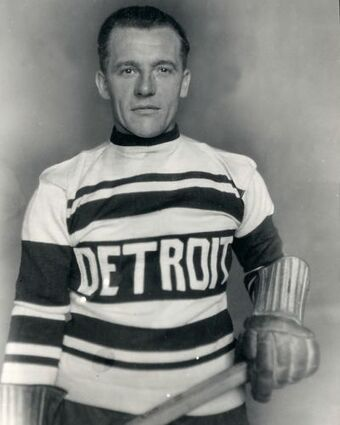
- Born: July 17, 1897 Cornwall, Ontario, Canada
- Died: July 4, 1955 (aged 57)
- Height: 5 ft 7 in (170 cm)
- Weight: 160 lb (73 kg; 11 st 6 lb)
- Position: Right wing
- Shot: Right
- Played for: Boston Bruins; Montreal Canadiens; Detroit Falcons; Detroit Cougars
- Playing career: 1918–1935

Carson Eric "Shovel Shot" Cooper (July 17, 1897 – July 4, 1955) was a Canadian ice hockey player who played 8 seasons in the National Hockey League for the Boston Bruins, Montreal Canadiens, Detroit Cougars and Detroit Falcons between 1924 and 1932.

Born in Cornwall, Ontario, Cooper scored the winning goal for the Boston Bruins in the team's first NHL game on December 1, 1924. It was the Bruins' second goal in a 2-1 win against the other 1924-25 expansion team, the Montreal Maroons. Cooper later served as the Chief Scout with the Detroit Red Wings. His name was engraved on the Stanley Cup in 1950, 1952 with Detroit.

Cooper played senior lacrosse in Hamilton, Ontario in the early 1920s. He was teammates and roommates with future professional hockey players Hap Day, and future Canadian Amateur Hockey Association president Frank Sargent.

== Career statistics ==
=== Regular season and playoffs ===
			Regular season					Playoffs
Season	Team	League	GP	G	A	Pts	PIM	GP	G	A	Pts	PIM
1916–17	Montreal Canada Cement	MCHL	—	—	—	—	—	—	—	—	—	—
1917–18	Hamilton Tigers	OHA Sr	—	—	—	—	—	—	—	—	—	—
1918–19	Hamilton Tigers	OHA Sr	7	1	1	2	—	—	—	—	—	—
1919–20	Hamilton Tigers	OHA Sr	6	18	2	20	—	2	2	0	2	0
1920–21	Hamilton Tigers	OHA Sr	10	14	2	16	—	—	—	—	—	—
1921–22	Hamilton Tigers	OHA Sr	10	22	1	23	—	—	—	—	—	—
1922–23	Hamilton Tigers	OHA Sr	12	20	7	27	—	2	1	1	2	2
1923–24	Hamilton Tigers	OHA Sr	10	33	7	40	—	2	5	1	6	—
1924–25	Boston Bruins	NHL	12	5	3	8	4	—	—	—	—	—
1925–26	Boston Bruins	NHL	36	28	3	31	10	—	—	—	—	—
1926–27	Boston Bruins	NHL	10	0	0	0	0	—	—	—	—	—
1926–27	Montreal Canadiens	NHL	14	9	3	12	16	3	0	0	0	0
1927–28	Detroit Cougars	NHL	43	15	2	17	32	—	—	—	—	—
1928–29	Detroit Cougars	NHL	43	18	9	27	14	2	0	0	0	2
1929–30	Detroit Cougars	NHL	44	18	18	36	14	—	—	—	—	—
1930–31	Detroit Falcons	NHL	44	14	14	28	10	—	—	—	—	—
1931–32	Detroit Falcons	NHL	48	3	5	8	11	2	0	0	0	0
1932–33	Detroit Olympics	IHL	2	0	0	0	0	—	—	—	—	—
1933–34	Detroit Olympics	IHL	37	11	6	17	16	6	1	1	2	2
1934–35	Windsor Bulldogs	IHL	14	4	5	9	4	—	—	—	—	—
1934–35	Detroit Olympics	IHL	12	2	4	6	0	3	0	0	0	2
NHL totals			294	110	57	167	111	7	0	0	0	2

Preceded by George Hay	Detroit Falcons captain 1931–32	Succeeded by Detroit Red Wings captains Larry Aurie
