= Charles Cahill (ice hockey) =

Canadian ice hockey player (1904–1954)

- Born: January 4, 1904 Summerside, Prince Edward Island, Canada
- Died: June 5, 1954 (aged 50)
- Height: 5 ft 10 in (178 cm)
- Weight: 181 lb (82 kg; 12 st 13 lb)
- Position: Right wing
- Shot: Right
- Played for: Boston Bruins
- Playing career: 1921–1931; 1935–1939

Charles Edward Cahill (January 4, 1904 – June 5, 1954) was a Canadian ice hockey right winger.

== Early life ==
Cahill was born in Summerside, Prince Edward Island. He played junior hockey with the Summerside Crystals.

== Career ==
Cahill played parts of two seasons in the National Hockey League with the Boston Bruins from 1925 to 1927. The rest of his career, which lasted from 1921 to 1939 (with a break from 1931 to 1935), was mainly spent in minor leagues and senior leagues.

== Career statistics ==
=== Regular season and playoffs ===
| | | | Regular season | | | | | Playoffs |
| Season | Team | League | GP | G | A | Pts | PIM | GP | G | A | Pts | PIM |
|---|---|---|---|---|---|---|---|---|---|---|---|---|
| 1921–22 | Summerside Pioneers | PEI Sr | — | — | — | — | — | — | — | — | — | — |
| 1922–23 | Summerside Crystals | NBPEI | 6 | 19 | 3 | 22 | 12 | — | — | — | — | — |
| 1923–24 | Summerside Crystals | PEI Sr | 9 | 16 | 2 | 18 | 4 | 4 | 5 | 1 | 6 | 0 |
| 1924–25 | Summerside Crystals | PEI Sr | 5 | 11 | 6 | 17 | 4 | 4 | 4 | 2 | 6 | 4 |
| 1925–26 | Boston Bruins | NHL | 31 | 0 | 1 | 1 | 4 | — | — | — | — | — |
| 1926–27 | Boston Bruins | NHL | 1 | 0 | 0 | 0 | 0 | — | — | — | — | — |
| 1926–27 | New Haven Eagles | Can-Am | 26 | 10 | 1 | 11 | 35 | 4 | 0 | 0 | 0 | 14 |
| 1927–28 | New Haven Eagles | Can-Am | 28 | 8 | 1 | 9 | 24 | — | — | — | — | — |
| 1928–29 | Philadelphia Arrows | Can-Am | 36 | 9 | 1 | 10 | 38 | — | — | — | — | — |
| 1929–30 | Philadelphia Arrows | Can-Am | 39 | 18 | 13 | 31 | 60 | 2 | 0 | 0 | 0 | 2 |
| 1930–31 | Buffalo Bisons | IHL | 37 | 6 | 1 | 7 | 30 | 6 | 0 | 1 | 1 | 0 |
| 1935–36 | Summerside Crsytals | PEI Sr | 5 | 4 | 6 | 10 | 2 | 4 | 4 | 5 | 9 | 2 |
| 1936–37 | Summerside Crystals | PEI Sr | 9 | 5 | 1 | 6 | 8 | 4 | 2 | 1 | 3 | 10 |
| 1937–38 | Summerside Crystals | PEI Sr | 12 | 10 | 12 | 22 | 16 | 6 | 3 | 4 | 7 | 6 |
| 1937–38 | Summerside Crystals | Al-Cup | — | — | — | — | — | 4 | 2 | 1 | 3 | 2 |
| 1938–39 | Summerside Crystals | PEI Sr | 3 | 2 | 3 | 5 | 0 | 5 | 3 | 3 | 6 | 2 |
| NHL totals | | | 32 | 0 | 1 | 1 | 4 | — | — | — | — | — |
