= 1926–27 Detroit Cougars season =

National Hockey League team season

1926–27 Detroit Cougars
- Division: 5th American
- 1926–27 record: 12–28–4
- Home record: 6–15–1
- Road record: 6–13–3
- Goals for: 76
- Goals against: 105

Team information
- General manager: Art Duncan
- Coach: Art Duncan; Duke Keats
- Captain: Art Duncan
- Arena: Border Cities Arena
- Average attendance: 4,400

Team leaders
- Goals: John Sheppard (13)
- Assists: John Sheppard (8); Gordon "Duke" Keats (8)
- Points: John Sheppard (21)
- Penalty minutes: John Sheppard (60)
- Wins: Hap Holmes (11)
- Goals against average: Herb Stuart (1.67)

The 1926–27 Detroit Cougars season was the first season of National Hockey League (NHL) hockey in Detroit, Michigan. The Detroit Cougars scored 28 points, finished at the bottom of the American Division as well as the league and failed to make the playoffs in their inaugural year.

== Founding ==
On May 15, 1926, the Townsend syndicate of investors was granted a conditional expansion NHL franchise, to begin play in the upcoming season if their arena was ready. For players, the syndicate decided to purchase one of the most successful teams from the bankrupt Western Canada Hockey League, the Victoria Cougars, who had won the Stanley Cup in 1925. On September 25, 1926, the NHL made the franchise purchase permanent, although the arena was not ready. The expansion club kept the Cougars name. The club played in Windsor for the entire season.

== Regular season ==
Olympia Stadium wasn't finished being built in time for the 1926–27 season, so the Cougars began play in Border Cities Arena right across the Detroit River in Windsor, Ontario. The team struggled as the players adjusted to the style of play in the NHL and the team finished with only twelve wins on the season and over 80,000 USD in debt. The team's total of 28 points is the lowest total points for a season in the Detroit Red Wings' franchise history.

The team's first game, a "home" game in Windsor, was played on November 18 before a sell-out crowd of 6,000. Starting goaltender Hap Holmes took ill two hours before game time and substitute Herb Stuart gave up two goals in the first three minutes before shutting down the Boston Bruins for the rest of the game. However, Detroit could not score on Doc Stewart in the Boston net and lost 2–0.

Haldor "Slim" Halderson scored the first goal in franchise history in the third period of a loss to Pittsburgh on November 20. The team won its first game on November 24, defeating expansion cousins Chicago Black Hawks, 1–0, in Chicago. Frank Frederickson scored the game's only goal. On November 30, Russell Oatman had the first multiple goal game in franchise history, scoring two goals in a 4–0 victory over the Maroons. In the same game, Hap Holmes recorded the first shutout in franchise history.

On January 1, 1927, the Cougars suspended Oatman and Hobie Kitchen for "breaking training." The Cougars then shook up their line-up that week by selling Oatman to the Maroons and trading Frank Fredrickson and Harry Meeking to the Bruins for Duke Keats and Archie Briden.

After 33 games, the Cougars replaced Duncan as coach with Keats. Duncan has a record of 10–21–2. Keats record was 2–7–2.

=== Final standings ===
American Division
	GP	W	L	T	GF	GA	Pts
**New York Rangers**	44	25	13	6	95	72	56
**Boston Bruins**	44	21	20	3	97	89	45
**Chicago Black Hawks**	44	19	22	3	115	116	41
Pittsburgh Pirates	44	15	26	3	79	108	33
Detroit Cougars	44	12	28	4	76	105	28

Note: GP = Games Played, W = Wins, L = Losses, T = Ties, Pts = Points, GF = Goals For, GA = Goals Against
Teams that qualified for the playoffs are highlighted in bold. For complete final standings, see 1926–27 NHL season

=== Record vs. opponents ===
==== Vs. American Division ====
1926–27 NHL records
Team	**BOS**	**CHI**	**DET**	**NYR**	**PIT**	**Total**
Boston	—	3–2–1	5–1	2–3–1	4–2	**14–8–2**
Chicago	2–3–1	—	3–2–1	2–4	2–4	**9–13–2**
Detroit	1–5	2–3–1	—	1–3–2	2–4	**6–15–3**
N.Y. Rangers	3–2–1	4–2	3–1–2	—	5–1	**15–6–3**
Pittsburgh	2–4	4–2	4–2	1–5	—	**11–13–0**

==== Vs. Canadian Division ====
1926–27 NHL records
Team	**MTL**	**MTM**	**NYA**	**OTT**	**TOR**	**Total**
Boston	1–2–1	2–2	2–2	1–3	1–3	**7–12–1**
Chicago	2–2	2–2	2–1–1	2–2	2–2	**10–9–1**
Detroit	0–4	1–3	3–1	1–3	1–2–1	**6–13–1**
N.Y. Rangers	3–1	2–1–1	3–1	0–3–1	2–1–1	**10–7–3**
Pittsburgh	0–3–1	2–1–1	0–4	1–3	1–2–1	**4–13–3**

== Schedule and results ==
1926–27 regular season
November: 3–2–0 (home: 1–1–0; road: 2–1–0)

Game	Date	Visitor	Score	Home	OT	Record	Pts
1	November 18	Boston	2–0	Detroit		0–1–0	0
2	November 20	Detroit	1–4	Pittsburgh		0–2–0	0
3	November 24	Detroit	1–0	Chicago		1–2–0	2
4	November 27	NY Americans	2–4	Detroit		2–2–0	4
5	November 30	Detroit	4–0	Mtl. Maroons		3–2–0	6

December: 2–6–1 (home: 1–4–0; road: 1–2–1)

Game	Date	Visitor	Score	Home	OT	Record	Pts
6	December 4	NY Rangers	0–1	Detroit		4–2–0	8
7	December 9	Ottawa	3–1	Detroit		4–3–0	8
8	December 11	NY Americans	4–2	Detroit		4–4–0	8
9	December 14	Detroit	2–7	Boston		4–5–0	8
10	December 16	Detroit	5–0	Ottawa		5–5–0	10
11	December 19	Detroit	1–1	NY Rangers	OT	5–5–1	11
12	December 23	Mtl. Canadiens	3–2	Detroit		5–6–1	11
13	December 25	Detroit	0–2	Chicago		5–7–1	11
14	December 30	Mtl. Maroons	2–0	Detroit		5–8–1	11

January: 3–8–1 (home: 1–2–0; road: 2–6–1)

Game	Date	Visitor	Score	Home	OT	Record	Pts
15	January 1	Pittsburgh	3–2	Detroit		5–9–1	11
16	January 4	Toronto	2–1	Detroit		5–10–1	11
17	January 6	Detroit	3–1	Pittsburgh		6–10–1	13
18	January 9	Detroit	1–4	NY Rangers		6–11–1	13
19	January 11	Detroit	1–0	NY Americans	OT	7–11–1	15
20	January 13	Boston	2–3	Detroit		8–11–1	17
21	January 15	Detroit	1–1	Toronto	OT	8–11–2	18
22	January 18	Detroit	3–5	Mtl. Canadiens		8–12–2	18
23	January 22	Detroit	0–1	Pittsburgh		8–13–2	18
24	January 25	Detroit	1–2	Mtl. Maroons		8–14–2	18
25	January 27	Detroit	1–3	Ottawa		8–15–2	18
26	January 29	Detroit	0–2	NY Rangers		8–16–2	18

February: 2–6–0 (home: 2–4–0; road: 0–2–0)

Game	Date	Visitor	Score	Home	OT	Record	Pts
27	February 1	Chicago	3–4	Detroit	OT	9–16–2	20
28	February 8	Detroit	0–2	Boston		9–17–2	20
29	February 12	Mtl. Canadiens	4–1	Detroit		9–18–2	20
30	February 15	Toronto	1–5	Detroit		10–18–2	22
31	February 17	Ottawa	2–1	Detroit		10–19–2	22
32	February 19	Chicago	4–1	Detroit		10–20–2	22
33	February 22	Detroit	2–3	Boston		10–21–2	22
34	February 24	Mtl. Maroons	2–0	Detroit		10–22–2	22

March: 2–6–2 (home: 1–4–1; road: 1–2–1)

Game	Date	Visitor	Score	Home	OT	Record	Pts
35	March 1	Detroit	0–3	Mtl. Canadiens		10–23–2	22
36	March 5	Detroit	2–4	Toronto		10–24–2	22
37	March 8	Chicago	4–1	Detroit		10–25–2	22
38	March 10	Pittsburgh	1–7	Detroit		11–25–2	24
39	March 13	NY Rangers	2–2	Detroit	OT	11–25–3	25
40	March 15	Detroit	1–0	NY Americans		12–25–3	27
41	March 17	NY Rangers	2–0	Detroit		12–26–3	27
42	March 19	Boston	3–1	Detroit		12–27–3	27
43	March 22	Detroit	3–3	Chicago	OT	12–27–4	28
44	March 26	Pittsburgh	6–4	Detroit	OT	12–28–4	28

Legend: Win (2 points) Loss (0 points) Tie (1 point)

== Player statistics ==
=== Scoring leaders ===
Note: GP = Games played; G = Goals; A = Assists; Pts = Points; +/- = Plus/minus; PIM = Penalty minutes

		Regular season					Playoffs
Player	Pos	GP	G	A	Pts	PIM	GP	G	A	Pts	PIM
John Sheppard	F	43	13	8	21	60	–	–	–	–	–
Gordon "Duke" Keats*	C	25	11	8	19	42	–	–	–	–	–
Frank Foyston	C	41	10	5	15	16	–	–	–	–	–
Clem Loughlin	D	34	7	3	10	40	–	--	–	–	–
Fred Gordon	RW	36	5	5	10	28	–	–	–	–	–
Frank Fredrickson*	C	16	4	6	10	12	–	–	–	–	–
Archie Briden*	LW	32	5	2	7	36	–	–	–	–	–
Jack Walker	F	37	3	4	7	6	–	–	–	–	–
Pete Bellefeuille*	RW	18	6	0	6	14	–	–	–	–	–
Jack Arbour	D	37	4	1	5	46	–	–	–	–	–
Art Duncan	D	34	3	2	5	26	–	–	–	–	–
Russell Oatman*	LW	14	3	0	3	12	–	–	–	–	–
Harold "Slim" Halderson*	D	18	2	0	2	29	–	–	–	–	–
Chapman "Hobie" Kitchen	F	17	0	2	2	42	–	–	–	–	–
James Riley*	D	2	0	0	0	0	–	–	–	–	–
Harold "Gizzy" Hart*	LW	6	0	0	0	0	–	–	–	–	–
Harry Meeking*	D	6	0	0	0	4	–	–	–	–	–

*Stats reflect games played with Detroit only.

=== Goaltending ===
Note: GP = Games played; TOI = Time on ice (minutes); W = Wins; L = Losses; OTL = Overtime losses; GA = Goals against; SO = Shutouts; SV% = Save percentage; GAA = Goals against average

	Regular season								Playoffs
Player	GP	TOI	W	L	T	GA	SO	GAA	GP	TOI	W	L	GA	SO	GAA
Hap Holmes	41	2685	11	26	4	100	6	2.23	–	–	–	–	–	–	–
Herb Stuart	3	180	1	2	0	5	0	1.67	–	–	–	–	–	–	–

== Transactions ==
The Cougars were involved in the following transactions during the 1926–27 season.

=== Trades ===
October 18, 1926	To Detroit Cougars Art Duncan	To Chicago Black Hawks Gord Fraser; Art Gagne
October 27, 1926	To Detroit Cougars Fred Gordon	To Saskatoon Crescents (WHL) Cash
December 12, 1926	To Detroit Cougars Cash	To Montreal Canadiens Harold "Gizzy" Hart
January 6, 1927	To Detroit Cougars Cash	To Montreal Maroons Russell Oatman
January 7, 1927	To Detroit Cougars Archie Briden; Gordon "Duke" Keats	To Boston Bruins Frank Fredrickson; Harry Meeking
January 7, 1927	To Detroit Cougars Pete Bellefeuille	To Toronto St. Pats Harold "Slim" Halderson

== See also ==
- 1926–27 NHL season
