= 1926–27 Chicago Black Hawks season =

NHL ice hockey team season (inaugural season)

1926–27 Chicago Black Hawks
- Division: 3rd American
- 1926–27 record: 19–22–3
- Home record: 12–8–2
- Road record: 7–14–1
- Goals for: 115
- Goals against: 116

Team information
- General manager: Frederic McLaughlin
- Coach: Pete Muldoon
- Captain: Dick Irvin
- Arena: Chicago Coliseum

Team leaders
- Goals: Babe Dye (25)
- Assists: Dick Irvin (18)
- Points: Dick Irvin (36)
- Penalty minutes: Percy Traub (93)
- Wins: Hugh Lehman (19)
- Goals against average: Hugh Lehman (2.49)

The 1926–27 Chicago Black Hawks season was the team's first season. Chicago was awarded an NHL franchise. Most of the team's players came from the Portland Rosebuds of the Western Canada Hockey League, which had folded the previous season. The team would qualify for the playoffs in their first season, but lost in a 2-game total goal series.

Coffee tycoon Frederic McLaughlin bought the team from the syndicate who had been awarded the franchise by the NHL. McLaughlin had been a commander with the 333rd Machine Gun Battalion of the 86th Infantry Division during World War I. This division was nicknamed the "Black Hawk Division", after a Native American of the Sauk nation, Chief Black Hawk, who was a prominent figure in the history of Illinois. McLaughlin evidently named the team in honor of the military unit, and his wife, Irene Castle, designed the team's logo.

The team faced immediate competition from Eddie Livingstone's rival Chicago Cardinals of the American Hockey Association (AHA) which also played in the Coliseum. Both teams gave away tickets in droves and engaged in a price war. Under the financial strain, and pressure brought to bear on the AHA by the NHL, the Cardinals folded before the end of the season. The Black Hawks would sign away several of the Cardinals' players.

== Regular season ==
=== November ===
The Hawks would play their first ever game on November 17, 1926, at the Chicago Coliseum, defeating the Toronto St. Pats by a 4–1 score before an overflow crowd of 7,000 (the capacity was normally 6,000). Tex Rickard, who had orchestrated the start-up of the New York Rangers, organized the first game as a major social event, similar to the Rangers' own first home game. The game was a benefit, with proceeds going to a junior ice hockey league. The Black Hawks first goal was scored by George Hay at 3:30 of the first period. Hay scored a goal 50 seconds later at 4:20 to lead the team with two goals, while goaltender Hugh Lehman made 36 saves in the win.

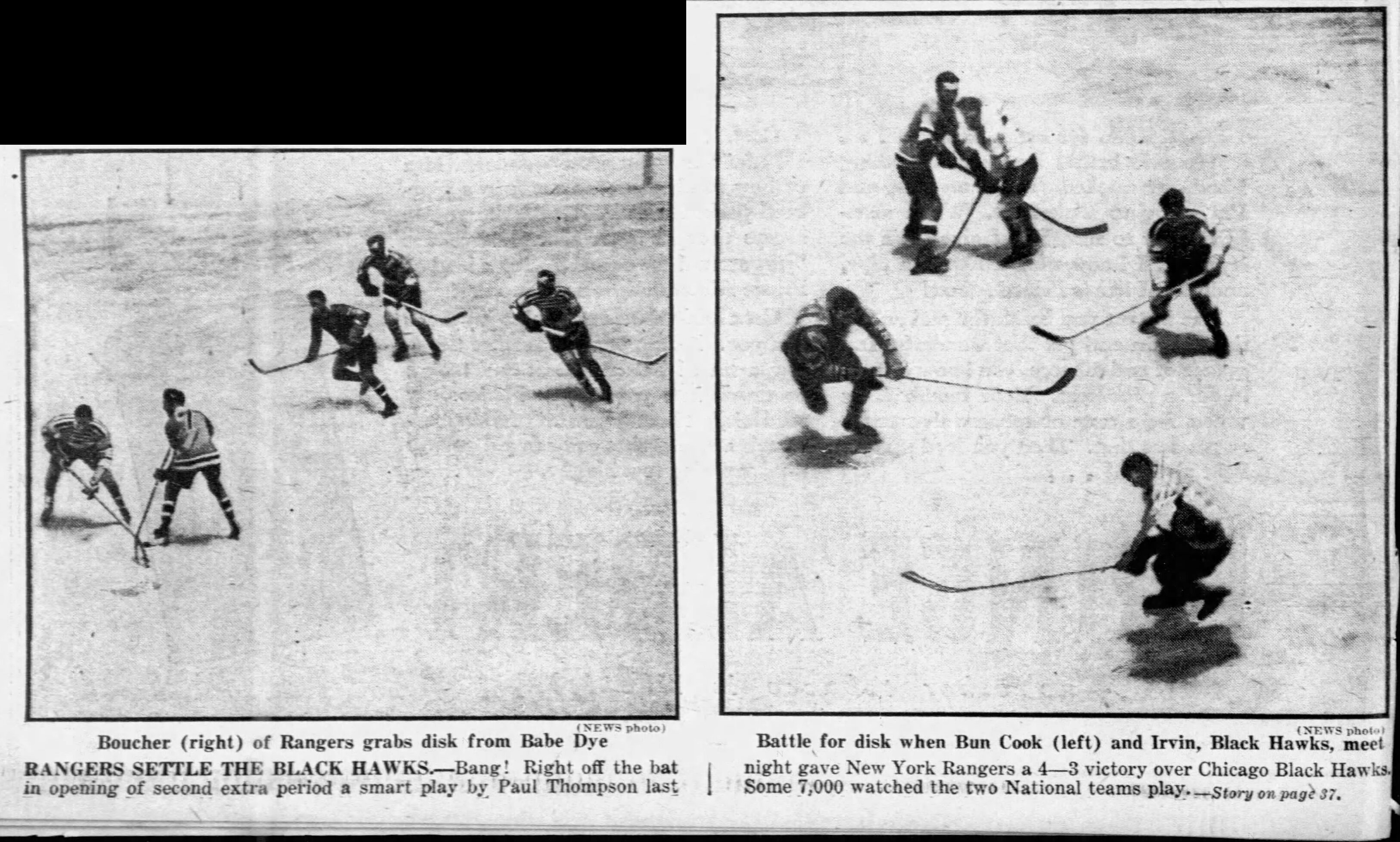
Plays from the November 30 game against the New York Rangers

Chicago would win their next game over the Boston Bruins to improve to 2–0–0, however, the club dropped their next three games, including their first ever road game, which was a 4–3 overtime loss to the New York Rangers on November 30.

The Black Hawks had a 2–3–0 record in November, earning four points. Chicago was in a fourth place tie with the Boston Bruins in the five team American Division, four points behind the first place New York Rangers.

=== December ===
Chicago began December with a 2–2 tie with the New York Americans, ending their three-game losing skid, as Rabbit McVeigh scored a goal late in the third period. On December 4, the Black Hawks ended their four-game winless streak with a 5–3 win over the Montreal Maroons at the Montreal Forum. This was the first road victory for the club.

The Black Hawks would drop their next two games, however, on December 11, Hugh Lehman allowed no goals in a 3–0 win over the Montreal Canadiens to earn the first shutout in club history. This kicked off a three-game winning streak, as the Black Hawks would defeat the New York Americans and New York Rangers. Following a 3–1 loss to the Montreal Canadiens on December 22, the Black Hawks would win their final two games of the month, including a 2–0 shutout win over the Detroit Cougars on Christmas Day. On December 29, the Black Hawks overcame a 4–0 deficit to defeat the Montreal Maroons 5–4 in overtime.

Chicago earned a record of 6–3–1 during the month of December, bringing their overall record to 8–6–1, earning 17 points. The Black Hawks were in first place in the American Division at the end of the month.

=== January ===
The Black Hawks lost their first two games of January, including a 4–0 loss to the New York Rangers on New Year's Day, dropping them out of first place in the American Division. Chicago returned to the win column on January 8, with a 4–0 win over the Pittsburgh Pirates, however, the Hawks would follow up the victory with two more losses, dropping them under .500 with a 9–10–1 record.

Chicago would win a thrilling overtime contest against the Toronto St. Pats, as Gord Fraser scored the winner to lead the Hawks to a 4–3 win over the St. Pats on January 19. The next night, the Black Hawks tied the Boston Bruins 2–2, however, the club would lose their last three games of January.

Chicago earned a record of 2–6–1 in January, dropping their overall record to 10–12–2, earning 22 points. The Black Hawks slid back in the standings, as the fell to fourth place in the American Division.

=== February ===
February began with two more losses, extending the Black Hawks losing streak to five games. The club snapped their losing skid with a 5–3 win over the best team in the NHL, the Ottawa Senators. Two nights later, on February 11, the Black Hawks easily defeated the Montreal Canadiens 6–1.

The Black Hawks lost their next two games, including a 2–1 overtime loss to the New York Americans and a 3–0 shutout loss to the Boston Bruins, dropping their record to 12–17–2. Chicago ended the two game losing skid with a very solid 4–1 win over the Detroit Cougars, then won their next game by a 3–1 score against the New York Americans. Chicago dropped their final game of February in overtime, losing 2–1 to the Montreal Maroons.

Chicago finished February with a 4–6–0 record in ten games. The Black Hawks overall win–loss record dropped to 14–18–2, earning 30 points, however, Chicago moved past the Pittsburgh Pirates and into third place in the American Division.

=== March ===
The Black Hawks started March off with a 3–0 shutout victory over the New York Rangers, as Hugh Lehman stopped all 31 shots he faced, leading Chicago to the win over the division leading team. In their next game, the Montreal Canadiens destroyed the Black Hawks, winning 7–1, which set the most goals allowed in a game by the club.

On March 5, the Black Hawks faced another tough opponent, visiting the league leading Ottawa Senators, however, the Black Hawks upset the Senators on an overtime goal by Rabbit McVeigh, as Chicago won 2–1. The Hawks won their next two games on the road, defeating the Detroit Cougars 4–1 and the Boston Bruins 4–0, bringing their overall record to 18–19–2.

Chicago returned home on March 15, however, the Bruins came out on top with a 2–1 win over the Hawks to end their three-game winning streak. The Hawks dropped their next game 6–2 to the Pittsburgh Pirates. Chicago finished the month with a win over the Pirates, a tie with a Cougars, and a loss to the New York Rangers.

The Black Hawks earned a 5–4–1 record in March, which marked the second time in the season that the club had a winning month. The Black Hawks would lead the league in goals scored with 115, however, they would also allow a league-high 116 goals, en route to a 19–22–3 record, good for third place in the American Division.

Babe Dye would lead the team with 25 goals, while Dick Irvin would have a club best 36 points, and finish second in the NHL scoring race by a single point to Bill Cook of the New York Rangers. Percy Traub would lead the Black Hawks with 93 penalty minutes.

=== Season standings ===
American Division
	GP	W	L	T	GF	GA	Pts
**New York Rangers**	44	25	13	6	95	72	56
**Boston Bruins**	44	21	20	3	97	89	45
**Chicago Black Hawks**	44	19	22	3	115	116	41
Pittsburgh Pirates	44	15	26	3	79	108	33
Detroit Cougars	44	12	28	4	76	105	28

Note: GP = Games Played, W = Wins, L = Losses, T = Ties, Pts = Points, GF = Goals For, GA = Goals Against
Teams that qualified for the playoffs are highlighted in bold.

=== Record vs. opponents ===
==== Vs. American Division ====
1926–27 NHL records
Team	**BOS**	**CHI**	**DET**	**NYR**	**PIT**	**Total**
Boston	—	3–2–1	5–1	2–3–1	4–2	**14–8–2**
Chicago	2–3–1	—	3–2–1	2–4	2–4	**9–13–2**
Detroit	1–5	2–3–1	—	1–3–2	2–4	**6–15–3**
N.Y. Rangers	3–2–1	4–2	3–1–2	—	5–1	**15–6–3**
Pittsburgh	2–4	4–2	4–2	1–5	—	**11–13–0**

==== Vs. Canadian Division ====
1926–27 NHL records
Team	**MTL**	**MTM**	**NYA**	**OTT**	**TOR**	**Total**
Boston	1–2–1	2–2	2–2	1–3	1–3	**7–12–1**
Chicago	2–2	2–2	2–1–1	2–2	2–2	**10–9–1**
Detroit	0–4	1–3	3–1	1–3	1–2–1	**6–13–1**
N.Y. Rangers	3–1	2–1–1	3–1	0–3–1	2–1–1	**10–7–3**
Pittsburgh	0–3–1	2–1–1	0–4	1–3	1–2–1	**4–13–3**

== Schedule and results ==
=== Regular season ===
1926–27 regular season
November

Game	Date	Visitor	Score	Home	Record	Points
1	November 17	Toronto St. Pats	1–4	Chicago Black Hawks	1–0–0	2
2	November 20	Boston Bruins	1–5	Chicago Black Hawks	2–0–0	4
3	November 24	Detroit Cougars	1–0	Chicago Black Hawks	2–1–0	5
4	November 27	Pittsburgh Pirates	5–3	Chicago Black Hawks	2–2–0	4
5	November 30	Chicago Black Hawks	3–4	New York Rangers	2–3–0	4

December

Game	Date	Visitor	Score	Home	Record	Points
6	December 1	Chicago Black Hawks	2–2	New York Americans	2–3–1	5
7	December 4	Chicago Black Hawks	5–3	Montreal Maroons	3–3–1	7
8	December 7	Ottawa Senators	3–2	Chicago Black Hawks	3–4–1	7
9	December 9	Chicago Black Hawks	2–5	Toronto St. Pats	3–5–1	7
10	December 11	Chicago Black Hawks	3–0	Montreal Canadiens	4–5–1	9
11	December 15	New York Rangers	2–6	Chicago Black Hawks	5–5–1	11
12	December 18	New York Americans	2–4	Chicago Black Hawks	6–5–1	13
13	December 22	Montreal Canadiens	3–1	Chicago Black Hawks	6–6–1	13
14	December 25	Detroit Cougars	0–2	Chicago Black Hawks	7–6–1	15
15	December 29	Montreal Maroons	4–5	Chicago Black Hawks	8–6–1	17

January

Game	Date	Visitor	Score	Home	Record	Points
16	January 1	New York Rangers	4–0	Chicago Black Hawks	8–7–1	17
17	January 4	Pittsburgh Pirates	2–1	Chicago Black Hawks	8–8–1	17
18	January 8	Chicago Black Hawks	4–0	Pittsburgh Pirates	9–8–1	19
19	January 11	Chicago Black Hawks	3–6	Boston Bruins	9–9–1	19
20	January 16	Chicago Black Hawks	4–5	New York Rangers	9–10–1	19
21	January 19	Toronto St. Pats	3–4	Chicago Black Hawks	10–10–1	21
22	January 22	Boston Bruins	2–2	Chicago Black Hawks	10–10–2	22
23	January 27	Chicago Black Hawks	2–4	Pittsburgh Pirates	10–11–2	22
24	January 29	Chicago Black Hawks	1–6	Toronto St. Pats	10–12–2	22

February

Game	Date	Visitor	Score	Home	Record	Points
25	February 1	Chicago Black Hawks	3–4	Detroit Cougars	10–13–2	22
26	February 3	Chicago Black Hawks	0–3	Montreal Maroons	10–14–2	22
27	February 5	Chicago Black Hawks	1–2	Ottawa Senators	10–15–2	22
28	February 9	Ottawa Senators	3–5	Chicago Black Hawks	11–15–2	24
29	February 11	Montreal Canadiens	1–6	Chicago Black Hawks	12–15–2	26
30	February 13	Chicago Black Hawks	1–2	New York Americans	12–16–2	26
31	February 15	Chicago Black Hawks	0–3	Boston Bruins	12–17–2	26
32	February 19	Chicago Black Hawks	4–1	Detroit Cougars	13–17–2	28
33	February 23	New York Americans	1–3	Chicago Black Hawks	14–17–2	30
34	February 26	Montreal Maroons	2–1	Chicago Black Hawks	14–18–2	30

March

Game	Date	Visitor	Score	Home	Record	Points
35	March 1	New York Rangers	0–3	Chicago Black Hawks	15–18–2	32
36	March 3	Chicago Black Hawks	1–7	Montreal Canadiens	15–19–2	32
37	March 5	Chicago Black Hawks	2–1	Ottawa Senators	16–19–2	34
38	March 8	Chicago Black Hawks	4–1	Detroit Cougars	17–19–2	36
39	March 13	Chicago Black Hawks	4–0	Boston Bruins	18–19–2	38
40	March 15	Boston Bruins	2–1	Chicago Black Hawks	18–20–2	38
41	March 17	Chicago Black Hawks	2–6	Pittsburgh Pirates	18–21–2	38
42	March 19	Pittsburgh Pirates	2–3	Chicago Black Hawks	19–21–2	40
43	March 22	Detroit Cougars	3–3	Chicago Black Hawks	19–21–3	41
44	March 25	Chicago Black Hawks	0–4	New York Rangers	19–22–3	41

Legend: Win (2 points) Loss (0 points) Tie (1 point)

== Playoffs ==
Chicago would earn a spot in the playoffs and face the Boston Bruins in a 2-game total goal series. The Bruins would win the opening game by a 6–1 score, while the teams would play to a 4–4 draw in the 2nd game, giving the Bruins the series win with a 10–5 total score, and ending the Black Hawks first season.

=== Bruins 10, Black Hawks 5 ===
==== American Division semi-finals ====
===== (2) Boston Bruins vs. (3) Chicago Black Hawks =====
Note: Chicago played their home game at Madison Square Garden in New York, New York.

March 29	Boston Bruins	6 – 1	Chicago Black Hawks	Madison Square Garden	Recap
Frederickson (1) - (Unassisted) - 3:24; Cleghorn (1) - (Galbraith) - 14:36; Herbert (1) - (Unassisted) - 16:57		First period	No scoring
No scoring		Second period	9:43 - Fraser (1) - (Rodden)
Frederickson (2) - (Shore) - 8:26; Oliver (1) - (Unassisted) - 14:55; Shore (1) - (Unassisted) - 16:55		Third period	No scoring
Winkler (1-0-0)		Goalie stats	Lehman (0-1-0)

March 31	Chicago Black Hawks	4 – 4	Boston Bruins	Boston Arena	Recap
No scoring		First period	No scoring
Hay (1) - (Unassisted) - 16:00; Irvin (1) - (Unassisted) - 18:00		Second period	5:00 - Galbraith (1) - (Unassisted); 10:00 - Coutu (1) - (Galbraith); 15:00 - Galbraith (2) - (Unassisted)
Wilson (1) - (Unassisted) - 7:00; Irvin (2) - (Unassisted) - 10:00		Third period	4:00 - Galbraith (3) - (Oliver)
Lehman (0-1-1)		Goalie stats	Winkler (1-0-1)

Boston wins series 10 – 5

== Player statistics ==
=== Regular season ===
Scoring

Player	Pos	GP	G	A	Pts	PIM
Dick Irvin	C	43	18	18	36	34
Babe Dye	RW	41	25	5	30	14
George Hay	LW	35	14	8	22	12
Mickey MacKay	C	34	14	8	22	23
Gord Fraser	D	44	14	6	20	89
Charley McVeigh	C/LW	43	12	4	16	23
Cully Wilson	RW	39	8	4	12	40
Bobby Trapp	D	44	4	2	6	92
Eddie Rodden	C	19	3	3	6	0
Duke Dukowski	D	28	3	2	5	16
Percy Traub	D	42	0	2	2	93
Ken Doraty	F	18	0	0	0	0
Hugh Lehman	G	44	0	0	0	0
Gord McFarlane	RW/D	2	0	0	0	0
Jim Riley	LW	3	0	0	0	0
Art Townsend	D	5	0	0	0	0

Goaltending

Player	MIN	GP	W	L	T	GA	GAA	SO
Hugh Lehman	2797	44	19	22	3	116	2.49	5
Team:	2797	44	19	22	3	116	2.49	5

=== Playoffs ===
Scoring

Player	Pos	GP	G	A	Pts	PIM
George Hay	LW	2	1	2	3	2
Dick Irvin	C	2	2	0	2	4
Gord Fraser	D	2	1	0	1	6
Cully Wilson	RW	2	1	0	1	6
Eddie Rodden	C	2	0	1	1	0
Duke Dukowski	D	2	0	0	0	0
Babe Dye	RW	2	0	0	0	2
Hugh Lehman	G	2	0	0	0	0
Mickey MacKay	C	2	0	0	0	0
Charley McVeigh	C/LW	2	0	0	0	0
Bobby Trapp	D	2	0	0	0	4
Percy Traub	D	2	0	0	0	6

Goaltending

Player	MIN	GP	W	L	GA	GAA	SO
Hugh Lehman	120	2	0	1	10	5.00	0
Team:	120	2	0	1	10	5.00	0

Note: GP = Games played; G = Goals; A = Assists; Pts = Points; +/- = Plus/Minus; PIM = Penalty Minutes; PPG=Power-play goals; SHG=Short-handed goals; GWG=Game-winning goals
MIN=Minutes played; W = Wins; L = Losses; T = Ties; GA = Goals against; GAA = Goals against average; SO = Shutouts;

== See also ==
- 1926–27 NHL season
