= 1926–27 New York Rangers season =

NHL hockey team season

1926–27 New York Rangers
- American Division champions
- Division: 1st American
- 1926–27 record: 25–13–6
- Home record: 13–5–4
- Road record: 12–8–2
- Goals for: 95
- Goals against: 72

Team information
- General manager: Lester Patrick
- Coach: Lester Patrick
- Captain: Bill Cook
- Arena: Madison Square Garden

Team leaders
- Goals: Bill Cook (33)
- Assists: Frank Boucher (15)
- Points: Bill Cook (37)
- Penalty minutes: Taffy Abel (78)
- Wins: Lorne Chabot (22)
- Goals against average: Lorne Chabot (1.56)

The 1926–27 New York Rangers season was the franchise's first season. The team placed first in the new American Division and qualified for the playoffs, losing to the Boston Bruins. They were the last expansion team to win their division until the 1967–68 Philadelphia Flyers (which had a division full of expansion teams) and the last to do so without guarantee to win it until the 2017–18 Vegas Golden Knights. In the playoffs that year, they lost to second place Boston Bruins in the Semifinals.

== Off-season ==
The Rangers team was organized by Conn Smythe who used his extensive knowledge of available amateur players along with sound selection of players available from the dispersal of the Western Hockey League (WHL):

- The brothers Bill and Bun Cook were part of the dispersed players of the WHL, having played for the Saskatoon Sheiks;
- Frank Boucher was from the Vancouver Maroons of the WHL;
- Leo Bourgeault was also from Saskatoon of the WHL;
- Murray Murdoch had been a member of the 1923 Memorial Cup-winning University of Manitoba;
- Paul Thompson was a member of the junior Calgary Canadians, Memorial Cup winners in 1926;
- Taffy Abel had been a member of the silver medal-winning United States team in the 1924 Olympics;
- Stan Brown had been a member of the Allan Cup-winning Toronto Dentals team.

First picture of team at training camp in Toronto in 1926.

Smythe signed several players from the amateur Minneapolis Millers, including Taffy Abel, Billy Boyd and Ching Johnson. The 1925–26 Millers also provided other players to the NHL in the future, including Cooney Weiland and Tiny Thompson, Paul Thompson's brother.

Training camp was held in Toronto at the Ravina Gardens arena near Smythe's home. However, before the season started, Smythe was fired by the club and Lester Patrick took over from Smythe. Patrick received the job as part of the dispersal agreement of the WHL. His brother Frank received a job at the Boston Bruins. Smythe would eventually receive a $10,000 (1926) (equivalent to 141,465.61 in 2024) severance, a large amount in those days.

== Regular season ==
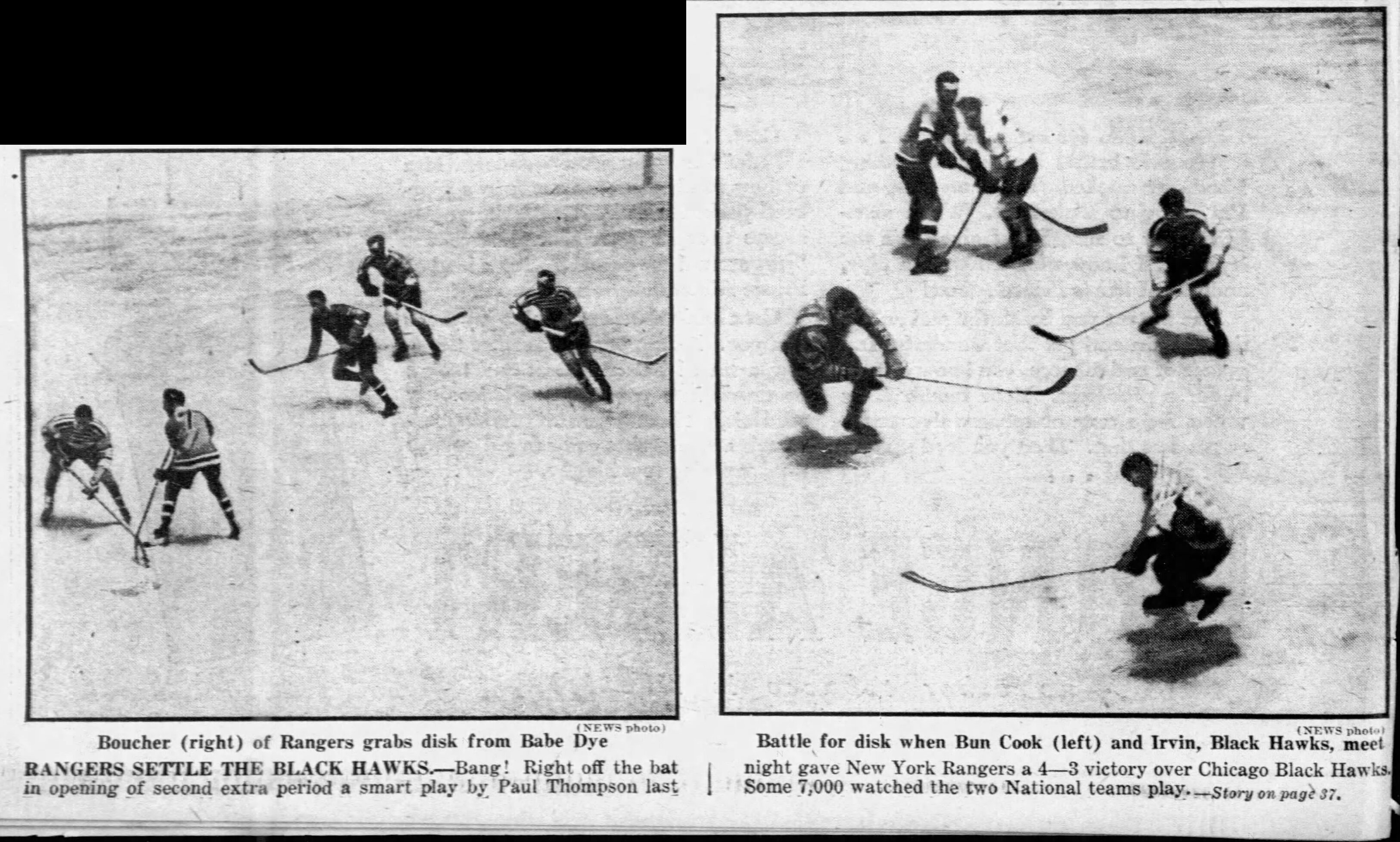
Plays from the November 30 game against the Chicago Black Hawks

Unlike the arenas where the players played before, the Madison Square Garden was kept heated. The temperature was warm due to the insistence of Tex Rickard, who insisted that "the public was everything and the performers nothing". The players complained about the conditions publicly and to Lester Patrick.

On opening night November 16, 1926 at Madison Square Garden, the ceremonial face-off between Frank Boucher of the Rangers and Nels Stewart of the Montreal Maroons was done by Lois Moran, the silent-film movie star. The opening night referee was Lou Marsh. The starting lineup was Boucher, Bill Cook, Bun Cook, Ching Johnson, Taffy Abel and Hal Winkler. The Rangers would win the game 1–0.

=== Final standings ===
American Division
	GP	W	L	T	GF	GA	Pts
**New York Rangers**	44	25	13	6	95	72	56
**Boston Bruins**	44	21	20	3	97	89	45
**Chicago Black Hawks**	44	19	22	3	115	116	41
Pittsburgh Pirates	44	15	26	3	79	108	33
Detroit Cougars	44	12	28	4	76	105	28

Note: GP = Games Played, W = Wins, L = Losses, T = Ties, Pts = Points, GF = Goals For, GA = Goals Against
Teams that qualified for the playoffs are highlighted in bold.

=== Record vs. opponents ===
==== Vs. American Division ====
1926–27 NHL records
Team	**BOS**	**CHI**	**DET**	**NYR**	**PIT**	**Total**
Boston	—	3–2–1	5–1	2–3–1	4–2	**14–8–2**
Chicago	2–3–1	—	3–2–1	2–4	2–4	**9–13–2**
Detroit	1–5	2–3–1	—	1–3–2	2–4	**6–15–3**
N.Y. Rangers	3–2–1	4–2	3–1–2	—	5–1	**15–6–3**
Pittsburgh	2–4	4–2	4–2	1–5	—	**11–13–0**

==== Vs. Canadian Division ====
1926–27 NHL records
Team	**MTL**	**MTM**	**NYA**	**OTT**	**TOR**	**Total**
Boston	1–2–1	2–2	2–2	1–3	1–3	**7–12–1**
Chicago	2–2	2–2	2–1–1	2–2	2–2	**10–9–1**
Detroit	0–4	1–3	3–1	1–3	1–2–1	**6–13–1**
N.Y. Rangers	3–1	2–1–1	3–1	0–3–1	2–1–1	**10–7–3**
Pittsburgh	0–3–1	2–1–1	0–4	1–3	1–2–1	**4–13–3**

== Schedule and results ==
1926–27 regular season
November: 4–1–0 (home: 2–0–0; road: 2–1–0)

Game	November	Opponent	Score	Record
1	16	Montreal Maroons	1–0	1–0–0
2	20	@ Toronto Maple Leafs	5–1	2–0–0
3	25	@ Pittsburgh Pirates	2–0	2–1–0
4	27	@ Montreal Canadiens	2–0	3–1–0
5	30	Chicago Black Hawks	4 – 3 OT	4–1–0

December: 3–5–1 (home: 2–1–1; road: 1–4–0)

Game	December	Opponent	Score	Record
6	4	@ Detroit Cougars	1–0	4–2–0
7	7	@ Boston Bruins	1–0	5–2–0
8	12	Boston Bruins	2 – 1 OT	6–2–0
9	15	@ Chicago Black Hawks	6–2	6–3–0
10	19	Detroit Cougars	1 – 1 OT	6–3–1
11	21	Pittsburgh Pirates	1–0	7–3–1
12	23	@ Ottawa Senators	1–0	7–4–1
13	26	@ New York Americans	5–2	7–5–1
14	28	Ottawa Senators	3 – 2 OT	7–6–1

January: 8–1–2 (home: 5–0–2; road: 3–1–0)

Game	January	Opponent	Score	Record
15	1	@ Chicago Black Hawks	4–0	8–6–1
16	6	Montreal Canadiens	1–0	9–6–1
17	9	Detroit Cougars	4–1	10–6–1
18	11	@ Montreal Maroons	3–2	11–6–1
19	13	Toronto Maple Leafs	1 – 1 OT	11–6–2
20	16	Chicago Black Hawks	5–4	12–6–2
21	18	@ Boston Bruins	7–3	12–7–2
22	20	Boston Bruins	2 – 2 OT	12–7–3
23	23	New York Americans	2–0	13–7–3
24	27	@ Montreal Canadiens	3–2	14–7–3
25	29	Detroit Cougars	2–0	15–7–3

February: 5–4–1 (home: 2–4–0; road: 3–0–1)

Game	February	Opponent	Score	Record
26	1	Montreal Canadiens	1 – 0 OT	15–8–3
27	6	Pittsburgh Pirates	2–1	16–8–3
28	10	@ Toronto Maple Leafs	3–2	17–8–3
29	12	@ Pittsburgh Pirates	3 – 2 OT	18–8–3
30	15	@ Ottawa Senators	2 – 2 OT	18–8–4
31	17	Montreal Maroons	4–1	18–9–4
32	20	Boston Bruins	3–1	19–9–4
33	22	Toronto Maple Leafs	3 – 2 OT	19–10–4
34	24	Ottawa Senators	1–0	19–11–4
35	27	@ New York Americans	4–1	20–11–4

March: 5–2–2 (home: 3–0–0; road: 2–2–2)

Game	March	Opponent	Score	Record
36	1	@ Chicago Black Hawks	3–0	20–12–4
37	5	@ Montreal Maroons	0 – 0 OT	20–12–5
38	13	@ Detroit Cougars	2 – 2 OT	20–12–6
39	15	@ Pittsburgh Pirates	5–0	21–12–6
40	17	@ Detroit Cougars	2–0	22–12–6
41	20	New York Americans	2–1	23–12–6
42	22	Pittsburgh Pirates	4–1	24–12–6
43	25	Chicago Black Hawks	4–0	25–12–6
44	26	@ Boston Bruins	4 – 3 OT	25–13–6

Legend: Win (2 points) Loss (0 points) Tie (1 point)

== Playoffs ==
The Rangers earned a bye in the first round and met the Boston Bruins in the semi-final. The Rangers were limited to one goal in the two games, losing the series three goals to one.

1927 Stanley Cup playoffs
Semifinals vs. (A2) Boston Bruins – Bruins win 3 goals to 1 goal

Game	Date	Visitor	Score	Home	OT	Series
1	April 2	New York Rangers	0–0	Boston Bruins	OT	Series tied 0 goals to 0
2	April 4	Boston	3–1	New York Rangers		Boston wins series 3 goals to 1

Legend: Win Loss Tie

== Player statistics ==
Skaters

Regular season
Player	GP	G	A	Pts	PIM
Bill Cook	44	33	4	37	58
Frank Boucher	44	13	15	28	17
Frederick Cook	44	14	9	23	42
Clarence Abel	44	8	4	12	78
Paul Thompson	43	7	3	10	12
Murray Murdoch	44	6	4	10	12
Stan Brown	24	6	2	8	14
Billy Boyd	41	4	1	5	40
Ivan Johnson	27	3	2	5	66
Leo Bourgeault^{†}	20	1	1	2	28
Lester Patrick	1	0	0	0	2
Ollie Reinikka	16	0	0	0	0
Reg Mackey	34	0	0	0	16

Playoffs
Player	GP	G	A	Pts	PIM
Clarence Abel	2	0	1	1	6
Bill Cook	2	1	0	1	4
Reg Mackey	2	0	0	0	0
Leo Bourgeault	2	0	0	0	0
Ivan Johnson	2	0	0	0	6
Stan Brown	2	0	0	0	0
Murray Murdoch	2	0	0	0	0
Paul Thompson	2	0	0	0	0
Frederick Cook	2	0	0	0	2
Frank Boucher	2	0	0	0	4

Goaltenders

Regular season
Player	GP	TOI	W	L	T	GA	GAA	SO
Lorne Chabot	36	2307	22	9	5	56	1.46	10
Hal Winkler^{‡}	8	514	3	4	1	16	1.87	2

Goaltenders

Playoffs
Player	GP	TOI	W	L	T	GA	GAA	SO
Lorne Chabot	2	120	0	1	1	3	1.50	1

^{†}Denotes player spent time with another team before joining Rangers. Stats reflect time with Rangers only.
^{‡}Traded mid-season. Stats reflect time with Rangers only.

Note:

Pos = Position;GP = Games played; G = Goals; A = Assists; Pts = Points; PIM = Penalty minutes; +/- = Plus/minus; PPG = Power-play goals; SHG = Short-handed goals; GWG = Game-winning goals
Pos = Position;GP = Games played; Min, TOI = Minutes played; W = Wins; L = Losses; T,T/OT = Ties; OTL = Overtime losses; GA = Goals-against; GAA = Goals-against average; SO = Shutouts; SA = Shots against; SV = Shots saved;SV% = Save percentage;

== See also ==
- 1926–27 NHL season
