= 1924–25 Boston Bruins season =

Professional ice hockey team season

1924–25 Boston Bruins
- League: 6th NHL
- 1924–25 record: 6–24–0 (12 points)
- Home record: 3–12–0
- Road record: 3–12–0
- Goals for: 49
- Goals against: 119

Team information
- General manager: Art Ross
- Coach: Art Ross
- Captain: none
- Arena: Boston Arena

Team leaders
- Goals: Jimmy Herbert (17)
- Assists: Jimmy Herbert (5)
- Points: Jimmy Herbert (22)
- Penalty minutes: Jimmy Herbert (50)
- Wins: Doc Stewart (5)
- Goals against average: Doc Stewart (3.08)

The 1924–25 Boston Bruins season was the team's 1st season in the National Hockey League (NHL). Along with the Montreal Maroons, the Bruins were the first expansion franchise in the NHL and the league's first American-based club. The Bruins finished sixth and last in the league standings and did not qualify for the playoffs.

== Offseason ==
In 1924, Charles Adams, the magnate who owned the Connor Grocery stores changed (which would merge with two other companies in 1925 to form the First National grocery chain), obtained an NHL expansion franchise for Boston. The approval was finalized on October 13, 1924, for US$15,000 (equivalent to $281,796 in 2025), making the Bruins the first NHL team to be based in the United States. Adams' first act was to hire Art Ross, a former star player and innovator, as general manager and coach.

Ross nicknamed the team "Bruins", which also went along with the team's original uniform colors of brown and yellow, which came from Adams' grocery chain. Most of the Bruins' players for its inaugural season were signed from the Pacific Coast Hockey Association and the Western Canada Hockey League. The first player to sign for the Bruins was defenseman Herb Mitchell, who signed for the Bruins on November 2, 1924.

The Bruins first saw action in an exhibition game against the Saskatoon Sheiks of the Western Canada Hockey League on November 29, which was then Thanksgiving; it was the first professional match held in Boston Arena. Boston lost the game 2–1.

Subsequently, leaks in the Arena's cooling system forced the team to practice in Montreal in the runup to the season opener.

== Regular season ==
Despite problems with the ice plant that threatened the home opener the Bruins started the season out auspiciously, defeating their fellow expansion Maroons squad in a nearly empty Arena 2–1. The first goal in franchise history was scored by Smokey Harris, while Carson Cooper, who assisted on Harris' goal, scored the game winner. It was the first NHL game played in the United States. The game was broadcast by radio station WBZ, with play-by-play by the Boston Traveler's Frank Ryan. Since the crowd failed to meet expectations, the Bruins dropped prices to US$2.75 (equivalent to $51.66 in 2025) for a reserved seat and US$1.10 (equivalent to $20.67 in 2025) for standing room.

However, Boston lost its next eleven games, as well as having a seven-game losing streak — which included their second home game on December 8, initiating the Bruins' most intense rivalry over time — and finished in the basement. The Bruins had signed veteran West Coast star goaltender Hec Fowler as their netminder, but behind a weak defense, Fowler and backup Howie Lockhart played very poorly and the Bruins were repeatedly shelled, allowing ten goals in a game twice, one of which saw Toronto player Babe Dye score five goals on December 22.

The signing of senior league star netminder Doc Stewart and the purchase of Lionel Hitchman helped somewhat, but the team was riddled with injuries, and only Jimmy Herbert and Carson Cooper (who spent much of the season hurt) showed any offensive flair. The team's winning percentage of .200 was the second worst in league history to that date, and remains the tenth worst in NHL history.

The Bruins' debut season home games were played in the only "debut" rink of any of the Original Six NHL teams that has survived into the 21st century — Boston Arena, the world's oldest indoor multi-sports facility that is still used for ice hockey at any level of competition.

=== Final standings ===
National Hockey League
	GP	W	L	T	GF	GA	Pts
**Hamilton Tigers**	30	19	10	1	90	60	39
**Toronto St. Patricks**	30	19	11	0	90	84	38
**Montreal Canadiens**	30	17	11	2	93	56	36
Ottawa Senators	30	17	12	1	83	66	35
Montreal Maroons	30	9	19	2	45	65	20
Boston Bruins	30	6	24	0	49	119	12

Note: W = Wins, L = Losses, T = Ties, GF = Goals For, GA = Goals Against, Pts = Points
Teams that qualified for the playoffs are highlighted in bold.

=== Record vs. opponents ===
1924–25 NHL Records
Team	BOS	HAM	MTL	MTM	OTT	TOR
Boston	—	1–5	2–4	3–3	0–6	0–6
Hamilton	5–1	—	3–3	4–2	3–2–1	4–2
M. Canadiens	4–2	3–3	—	4–0–2	3–3	3–3
M. Maroons	3–3	2–4	0–4–2	—	2–4	2–4
Ottawa	6–0	2–3–1	3–3	4–2	—	2–4
Toronto	6–0	2–4	3–3	4–2	4–2	—

== Schedule and results ==
1924–25 regular season
December: 1–8–0 (home: 1–3–0; road: 0–5–0)

Game	Date	Visitor	Score	Home	Record	Pts	Box Score
1	December 1	Maroons	1–2	Boston	1–0–0	2	
2	December 3	Boston	3–5	Toronto	1–1–0	2	
3	December 8	Canadiens	4–3	Boston	1–2–0	2	
4	December 10	Boston	1–7	Hamilton	1–3–0	2	
5	December 15	Ottawa	10–2	Boston	1–4–0	2	
6	December 17	Boston	2–6	Maroons	1–5–0	2	
7	December 22	Toronto	10–1	Boston	1–6–0	2	
8	December 25	Boston	0–5	Canadiens	1–7–0	2	
9	December 29	Boston	1–2	Hamilton	1–8–0	2	

January: 1–9–0 (home: 0–4–0; road: 1–5–0)

Game	Date	Visitor	Score	Home	Record	Pts	Box Score
10	January 1	Ottawa	5–2	Boston	1–9–0	2	
11	January 3	Maroons	4–3	Boston	1–10–0	2	
12	January 5	Boston	2–3	Toronto	1–11–0	2	
13	January 10	Canadiens	2–3	Boston	2–11–0	4 (OT)	
14	January 12	Boston	2–4	Hamilton	2–12–0	4	
15	January 17	Ottawa	3–2	Boston	2–13–0	4	
16	January 20	Boston	0–2	Maroons	2–14–0	4	
17	January 24	Toronto	4–3	Boston	2–15–0	4	
18	January 27	Boston	0–4	Canadiens	2–16–0	4	
19	January 31	Hamilton	8–3	Boston	2–17–0	4	

February: 2–6–0 (home: 1–3–0; road: 1–3–0)

Game	Date	Visitor	Score	Home	Record	Pts	Box Score
20	February 3	Boston	1–3	Ottawa	2–18–0	4	
21	February 7	Maroons	0–1	Boston	3–18–0	6	
22	February 10	Boston	1–5	Toronto	3–19–0	6	
23	February 14	Canadiens	5–1	Boston	3–20–0	6	
24	February 17	Boston	1–2	Hamilton	3–21–0	6	
25	February 21	Ottawa	3–0	Boston	3–22–0	6	
26	February 24	Boston	2–1	Maroons	4–22–0	8	
27	February 28	Toronto	5–1	Boston	4–23–0	8	

March: 2–1–0 (home: 1–1–0; road: 1–0–0)

Game	Date	Visitor	Score	Home	Record	Pts	Box Score
28	March 3	Canadiens	2–3	Boston	5–23–0	10	
29	March 7	Boston	2–0	Hamilton	6–23–0	12	
30	March 9	Ottawa	4–1	Boston	6–24–0	12	

Legend: Win (2 points) Loss (0 points) Tie (1 point)

== Player statistics ==
=== Leading scorers ===
Note: GP = Games played; G = Goals; A = Assists; Pts = Points; PIM = Penalty minutes

	Regular season					Playoffs					Ref
Player	GP	G	A	Pts	PIM	GP	G	A	Pts	PIM	Ref
Jimmy Herbert	30	17	6	23	53	–	–	–	–	–
Carson Cooper	12	5	3	8	4	–	–	–	–	–
Red Stuart	29	5	3	8	32	–	–	–	–	–
Stan Jackson	24	5	3	8	38	–	–	–	–	–
George Redding	27	3	2	5	10	–	–	–	–	–
Smokey Harris	6	3	1	4	8	–	–	–	–	–
Bernie Morris	6	2	0	2	0	–	–	–	–	–
Lionel Hitchman	18	2	0	2	22	–	–	–	–	–
Normand Shay	18	1	1	2	14	–	–	–	–	–
Bobby Rowe	4	1	0	1	0	–	–	–	–	–

=== Goaltenders ===
Note: GP = Games played; Min = Minutes; W = Wins; L = Losses; T = Ties; GA = Goals against; SO = Shutouts; GAA = Goals against average

	Regular season								Playoffs							Ref
Player	GP	Min	W	L	T	GA	SO	GAA	GP	Min	W	L	GA	SO	GAA
Doc Stewart	21	1266	5	16	0	65	2	3.08	–	–	–	–	–	–	–
Hec Fowler	7	409	1	6	0	42	0	6.16	–	–	–	–	–	–	–

== Transactions ==
- November 2, 1924 – Acquired Alf Skinner from Vancouver Maroons (PCHA) for cash
- November 2, 1924 – Acquired Bobby Rowe from Seattle Metropolitans (PCHA) for cash
- December 14, 1924 – Acquired Bill "Red" Stuart from Toronto St. Patricks for cash
- December 17, 1924 – Released Bobby Rowe
- December 19, 1924 – Acquired George Carroll from Montreal Maroons for the rights to Ernie Parkes
- December 21, 1924 – Traded Smokey Harris to Vancouver Maroons (WCHL) for cash
- January 3, 1925 – Traded Alf Skinner to Montreal Maroons for Bernie Morris and Bob Benson
- January 10, 1925 – Acquired Lionel Hitchman from the Ottawa Senators for cash
- January 18, 1925 – Traded Stan Jackson to Ottawa Senators for cash

== See also ==
- 1924–25 NHL season
