= 1924–25 Toronto St. Patricks season =

NHL hockey team season

1924–25 Toronto St. Patricks
- League: 2nd NHL
- 1924–25 record: 19–11–0
- Home record: 10–5–0
- Road record: 9–6–0
- Goals for: 90
- Goals against: 84

Team information
- General manager: Charles Querrie
- Coach: Eddie Powers
- Captain: John Ross Roach
- Arena: Arena Gardens

Team leaders
- Goals: Babe Dye (38)
- Assists: Hap Day (17)
- Points: Babe Dye (46)
- Penalty minutes: Bert Corbeau (76)
- Wins: John Ross Roach (19)
- Goals against average: John Ross Roach (2.80)

The 1924–25 Toronto St. Patricks season was Toronto's eighth in the National Hockey League (NHL). The St. Pats qualified for the playoffs for the first time since the 1921–22 season, finishing second. The St. Pats lost to the Montreal Canadiens in what turned out to be the NHL championship when Hamilton was suspended.

== Offseason ==
The team's majority shares held by Percy and Fred Hambly were sold to the partnership of mining magnate J. P. Bickell and movie theater impresario Nathan L. Nathanson, managing director of the Famous Players Theatre chain. Part-owner Charlie Querrie retained his minority ownership.

== Regular season ==
=== Final standings ===
National Hockey League
	GP	W	L	T	GF	GA	Pts
**Hamilton Tigers**	30	19	10	1	90	60	39
**Toronto St. Patricks**	30	19	11	0	90	84	38
**Montreal Canadiens**	30	17	11	2	93	56	36
Ottawa Senators	30	17	12	1	83	66	35
Montreal Maroons	30	9	19	2	45	65	20
Boston Bruins	30	6	24	0	49	119	12

Note: W = Wins, L = Losses, T = Ties, GF = Goals For, GA = Goals Against, Pts = Points
Teams that qualified for the playoffs are highlighted in bold.

=== Record vs. opponents ===
1924–25 NHL Records
Team	BOS	HAM	MTL	MTM	OTT	TOR
Boston	—	1–5	2–4	3–3	0–6	0–6
Hamilton	5–1	—	3–3	4–2	3–2–1	4–2
M. Canadiens	4–2	3–3	—	4–0–2	3–3	3–3
M. Maroons	3–3	2–4	0–4–2	—	2–4	2–4
Ottawa	6–0	2–3–1	3–3	4–2	—	2–4
Toronto	6–0	2–4	3–3	4–2	4–2	—

== Schedule and results ==
1924–25 regular season
November

Game	Result	Date	Score	Opponent	Record
1	L	November 29, 1924	1–7	@ Montreal Canadiens (1924–25)	0–1–0

December

Game	Result	Date	Score	Opponent	Record
2	W	December 3, 1924	5–3	Boston Bruins (1924–25)	1–1–0
3	L	December 5, 1924	3–10	Hamilton Tigers (1924–25)	1–2–0
4	W	December 10, 1924	6–3	@ Ottawa Senators (1924–25)	2–2–0
5	L	December 13, 1924	1–3	Montreal Maroons (1924–25)	2–3–0
6	L	December 17, 1924	2–5	Montreal Canadiens (1924–25)	2–4–0
7	W	December 22, 1924	10–1	@ Boston Bruins (1924–25)	3–4–0
8	L	December 25, 1924	1–8	@ Hamilton Tigers (1924–25)	3–5–0
9	L	December 27, 1924	3–4	Ottawa Senators (1924–25)	3–6–0

January

Game	Result	Date	Score	Opponent	Record
10	W	January 1, 1925	2–1	@ Montreal Maroons (1924–25)	4–6–0
11	L	January 3, 1925	1–3	Montreal Canadiens (1924–25)	4–7–0
12	W	January 5, 1925	3–2	@ Boston Bruins (1924–25)	5–7–0
13	W	January 10, 1925	3–1	Hamilton Tigers (1924–25)	6–7–0
14	W	January 14, 1925	3–2	Ottawa Senators (1924–25)	7–7–0
15	L	January 17, 1925	1–2	@ Montreal Maroons (1924–25)	7–8–0
16	W	January 21, 1925	4–2	@ Montreal Canadiens (1924–25)	8–8–0
17	W	January 24, 1925	4–3	Boston Bruins (1924–25)	9–8–0
18	L	January 28, 1925	0–4	@ Hamilton Tigers (1924–25)	9–9–0
19	W	January 31, 1925	2–1	@ Ottawa Senators (1924–25)	10–9–0

February

Game	Result	Date	Score	Opponent	Record
20	W	February 4, 1925	3–2	Montreal Maroons (1924–25)	11–9–0
21	W	February 7, 1925	5–4	Montreal Canadiens (1924–25)	12–9–0
22	W	February 10, 1925	5–1	@ Boston Bruins (1924–25)	13–9–0
23	W	February 14, 1925	3–1	Hamilton Tigers (1924–25)	14–9–0
24	W	February 18, 1925	4–2	Ottawa Senators (1924–25)	15–9–0
25	W	February 21, 1925	2–1	@ Montreal Maroons (1924–25)	16–9–0
26	W	February 25, 1925	3–1	@ Montreal Canadiens (1924–25)	17–9–0
27	W	February 28, 1925	5–1	Boston Bruins (1924–25)	18–9–0

March

Game	Result	Date	Score	Opponent	Record
28	L	March 4, 1925	2–3	@ Hamilton Tigers (1924–25)	18–10–0
29	L	March 7, 1925	0–3	@ Ottawa Senators (1924–25)	18–11–0
30	W	March 9, 1925	3–0	Montreal Maroons (1924–25)	19–11–0

**Legend**: Win (2 points) Loss (0 points) Tie (1 point)

== Playoffs ==
The St. Pats lost to the third-place Montreal Canadiens in a two-game, total-goals series 5–2. As the Hamilton Tigers went on strike, the Canadiens were named NHL champion.

1925 Stanley Cup playoffs
NHL championship vs. (3) Montreal Canadiens – Canadiens win 5 goals to 2 goals

Game	Date	Home	Score	Visitor	Score	OT
1	March 11	**Montreal Canadiens**	**3**	Toronto St. Patricks	2	
2	March 13	Toronto St. Patricks	0	**Montreal Canadiens**	**2**	

**Legend**: Win Loss

== Player statistics ==
Regular season
**Scoring**

Player	Pos	GP	G	A	Pts	PIM
Babe Dye	RW	29	38	8	46	41
Jack Adams	C	27	21	10	31	67
Hap Day	D	26	10	12	22	33
Bert McCaffrey	RW/D	30	10	6	16	12
Bert Corbeau	D	30	4	6	10	74
Albert Holway	D	25	2	2	4	20
Mike Neville	C	13	1	2	3	4
Lloyd Andrews	LW	7	1	0	1	0
Alvin Fisher	RW	9	1	0	1	4
Reg Noble	C/D	3	1	0	1	8
Reg Reid	LW	27	1	0	1	2
Rod Smylie	W	11	1	0	1	0
Billy Stuart	D	4	0	1	1	2
Charlie Cotch	LW	5	0	0	0	0
Stan Jackson	LW	3	0	0	0	7
John Ross Roach	G	30	0	0	0	0
Chris Speyer	D	2	0	0	0	0

**Goaltending**

Player	MIN	GP	W	L	T	GA	GAA	SO
John Ross Roach	1800	30	19	11	0	84	2.80	1
Team:	1800	30	19	11	0	84	2.80	1

Playoffs
**Scoring**

Player	Pos	GP	G	A	Pts	PIM
Jack Adams	C	2	1	0	1	7
Bert McCaffrey	RW/D	2	1	0	1	4
Bert Corbeau	D	2	0	0	0	10
Hap Day	D	2	0	0	0	0
Babe Dye	RW	2	0	0	0	0
Albert Holway	D	2	0	0	0	0
Mike Neville	C	2	0	0	0	0
Reg Reid	LW	2	0	0	0	0
John Ross Roach	G	2	0	0	0	0
Rod Smylie	W	1	0	0	0	0

**Goaltending**

Player	MIN	GP	W	L	GA	GAA	SO
John Ross Roach	120	2	0	2	5	2.50	0
Team:	120	2	0	2	5	2.50	0

Note:

Pos = Position;GP = Games played; G = Goals; A = Assists; Pts = Points; PIM = Penalty minutes; +/- = Plus/minus; PPG = Power-play goals; SHG = Short-handed goals; GWG = Game-winning goals
Pos = Position;GP = Games played; Min, TOI = Minutes played; W = Wins; L = Losses; T,T/OT = Ties; OTL = Overtime losses; GA = Goals-against; GAA = Goals-against average; SO = Shutouts; SA = Shots against; SV = Shots saved;SV% = Save percentage;

== Transactions ==
- October 21, 1924: Lost Free Agent Wilf Loughlin to the Regina Capitals (WCHL)
- November 12, 1924: Signed Free Agent Reg Reid
- December 8, 1924: Signed Free Agent Ernie Parkes
- December 8, 1924: Traded Ernie Parkes to the Boston Bruins for cash
- December 9, 1924: Signed Free Agent Hap Day
- December 14, 1924: Traded Red Stuart to the Boston Bruins for cash
- December 17, 1924: Lost Free Agent Stan Jackson to the Boston Bruins
- January 14, 1925: Signed Free Agent Mike Neville
- February 9, 1925: Signed Free Agent Charlie Cotch

== See also ==
- 1924–25 NHL season
