= 1924–25 Ottawa Senators season =

Professional ice hockey team season of play

1924–25 Ottawa Senators
- League: 4th NHL
- 1924–25 record: 17–12–1
- Home record: 10–4–1
- Road record: 7–8–0
- Goals for: 83
- Goals against: 66

Team information
- General manager: Tommy Gorman/Dave Gill
- Coach: Pete Green
- Captain: Cy Denneny
- Arena: Ottawa Auditorium

Team leaders
- Goals: Cy Denneny (27)
- Assists: Cy Denneny (15)
- Points: Cy Denneny (42)
- Penalty minutes: Hooley Smith (81)
- Wins: Alec Connell (17)
- Goals against average: Alec Connell (2.14)

The 1924–25 Ottawa Senators season was the club's 40th season of play and eighth season in the National Hockey League (NHL). Ottawa would finish in fourth place in the league, failing to make the playoffs for the first time since the 1917–18 NHL season, ending a streak of six straight seasons.

== Team business ==
The team's ownership changed once again, a year after Ted Dey gave up the business. Frank Ahearn and Tommy Gorman reached an impasse in the management of the team. Both attempted to buy out the other. In December, Ahearn accepted Gorman's $50,000 offer for the club. In January, Gorman's offer was off, after control over all shares was not arranged. However, this may have been used as an escape clause out of the agreement, as Gorman was later to accept a position with the New York Americans. Instead, Ahearn bought out Gorman for $35,000 and Ahearn's share of the Connaught Park Racetrack in Aylmer, Quebec.

On January 27, 1925, Dave Gill was named manager and secretary-treasurer, succeeding Gorman. Gill assumed the management of a team out of a playoff position, and beset by injuries. The Ottawa Journal wrote that Gill was the "logical" choice for the position, due to his business ties to Ahearn at the Ottawa Electric Railway, and that he was acting secretary-treasurer of the Auditorium for the past two seasons.

== Off-season ==
The NHL expanded to six teams, as the Montreal Maroons and the first US-based team, the Boston Bruins, joined the league. The NHL also added more games to the schedule, going from 24 to 30.

The Senators sold Clint Benedict and Punch Broadbent to the expansion Maroons. The two future Hall-of-Famers were blamed for the Senators' loss in the 1924 playoffs to the Canadiens. Benedict's case, ostensibly over a drinking problem, went to court for a resolution. Replacing them were two future Hall-of-Famers: Alec Connell in net and forward Hooley Smith.

== Regular season ==
Cy Denneny would have another spectacular season, leading the NHL in assists, finishing 2nd to Babe Dye of the Toronto St. Pats in points, and finishing 3rd to Dye and Aurel Joliat of the Montreal Canadiens in goals.

During the season, the Senators and Hamilton Tigers would play in the first-ever scoreless game in NHL regular season history on December 17.

=== November/December ===
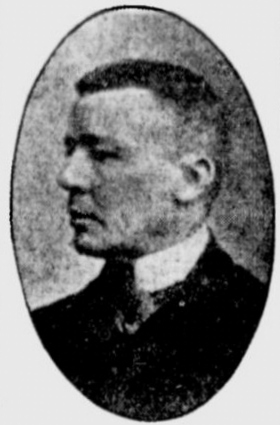
Coach Pete Green

- **November 29** – Ottawa opened the season with a road game at Barton Street Arena for a matchup against the Hamilton Tigers. King Clancy, Georges Boucher and Cy Denneny each scored a goal for the Senators, however, the Tigers scored twice in the third period, breaking a tie game to defeat Ottawa 5–3.
- **December 3** – The Senators hosted the Montreal Canadiens for their home opener. Edwin Gorman scored his first career goal, which turned out to be the game-winning goal, as Ottawa defeated Montreal 2–1. Goaltender Alec Connell earned his first career victory.
- **December 6** – Ottawa was on the road for their first ever visit to the Montreal Forum, as the Senators faced the expansion team, the Montreal Maroons. Edwin Gorman scored the lone Senators goal, as former Ottawa player Punch Broadbent scored twice for the Maroons, and former Senators goaltender Clint Benedict earned the win, as Ottawa lost the game 3–1.
- **December 10** – Ottawa returned home for a matchup against the Toronto St. Patricks. Toronto took a 4–0 lead midway through the third period, however, Ottawa scored three goals in a row to get within a goal. The St. Patricks scored two goals within 10 seconds late in the third, sending Ottawa to their second loss in a row by a score of 6–3. Cy Denneny led the Senators offense with two goals and an assist.
- **December 15** – The Senators made their first ever visit to the United States for a road game at Boston Arena against the newly formed expansion team, the Boston Bruins. The struggling Senators exploded offensively, easily defeating the Bruins 10–2. Cy Denneny scored four goals and added two assists, while Georges Boucher and King Clancy each scored twice.
- **December 17** – Ottawa was back at home for a matchup against the Hamilton Tigers. The game resulted in the first ever 0–0 tie in NHL history, as neither team could score a goal. Alec Connell earned the first shutout of his career.
- **December 20** – The Senators were on the road for their first visit of the season to Mount Royal Arena to face the Montreal Canadiens. Ottawa took a 2–1 lead into the third period as Georges Boucher and Cy Denneny each scored, however, the Canadiens struck twice within 30 seconds early in the period, and hung on for the victory, as the Senators lost 3–2.
- **December 23** – The Senators welcomed the Montreal Maroons to Ottawa for the first time. King Clancy scored the lone goal for the struggling Senators, as former Ottawa player Punch Broadbent scored the game-winning goal for Montreal, as Ottawa lost the game 2–1 and extended their winless streak to three games.
- **December 27** – Ottawa travelled to Toronto for a matchup against the Toronto St. Patricks at Mutual Street Arena for their first game after Christmas. The Senators were in full control of the game, leading 4–0 with only three minutes remaining in the third period, with Cy Denneny leading the way with two goals. Babe Dye of the St. Patricks scored three times in the final minutes, however, Ottawa hung on for a 4–3 win to end their winless streak.

Ottawa opened the first month of the season with a 3–5–1 record in nine games, earning seven points. Ottawa sat in fifth place in the NHL standings, two points behind the fourth place Montreal Maroons.

=== January ===
- **January 1** – The Senators opened the New Year on home ice, hosting the Boston Bruins for the first time in team history. Cy Denneny and Hooley Smith each scored two goals and added an assist, as Ottawa defeated Boston 5–2. The Senators won consecutive games for the first time all season.
- **January 3** – Ottawa concluded their two-game home stand against the red hot Hamilton Tigers. Hamilton entered the game leading the NHL with a record of 8–1–1. Cy Denneny scored both of the Senators goal, while Alec Connell recorded his second shutout of the season, both against Hamilton, as Ottawa won the game 2–0.
- **January 7** – The Senators were on the road for a game against the Montreal Canadiens. King Clancy and Cy Denneny each recorded goals for Ottawa, and Alec Connell recorded his second consecutive shutout, as the Senators shutout Montreal 2–0. The win extended the Senators winning streak to four games.
- **January 10** – Ottawa returned home for a matchup against the Montreal Maroons. Hooley Smith and Georges Boucher each scored twice to lead the Senators offense. Alec Connell stopped every shot for his third consecutive shutout, as the Senators defeated the Maroons 4–0.
- **January 14** – Ottawa was back on the road for a game against the Toronto St. Patricks. Cy Denneny scored two first period goals for the Senators, giving them a 2–0 lead. Alec Connell had his shutout streak broken, as Bert McCaffrey scored 2:30 into the second period for Toronto. The St. Patricks then scored two more goals, defeating Ottawa 3–2, and ending the Senators winning streak.
- **January 17** – Ottawa was back at home to face the Boston Bruins. Cy Denneny scored two goals, including the game winner with just four minutes remaining in the third period, as the Senators got back into the win column and defeated Boston 3–2.
- **January 21** – The Senators travelled on the road for a matchup against the league leading Hamilton Tigers. In a back-and-forth game, the Senators and Tigers were tied 4–4 after regulation time. In the extra period, the Tigers Billy Burch scored the game-winning goal, as Ottawa dropped the game 5–4. Edwin Gorman scored twice in the loss.
- **January 24** – Ottawa was back at home for a game against the Montreal Canadiens. Cy Denneny and Hooley Smith each had goals for the Senators, however, the Canadiens Aurele Joliat scored the winning goal in extra time, as the Senators dropped their second game in a row, losing 3–2.
- **January 28** – Ottawa travelled to Montreal to face off against the Montreal Maroons. Cy Denneny scored two goals, including the overtime winner 2:10 into the extra period, as the Senators defeated the Maroons 2–1.
- **January 31** – In their final game of January, the Senators hosted the Toronto St. Patricks. With no scoring in the game until the third period, King Clancy broke the scoreless tie, scoring with 5:15 remaining, giving Ottawa a 1–0 lead. Jack Adams responded for Toronto, scoring two late goals, as the Senators lost the game 2–1.

Ottawa earned a record of 5–4–0 in nine games in January. Overall, the Senators record during the season was 9–9–1, earning 19 points. The club was in third place and held on to the final playoff berth in the NHL, one point ahead of both the Toronto St. Patricks and Montreal Maroons.

=== February ===
- **February 3** – The Senators opened February on the road to face the Boston Bruins. Georges Boucher, King Clancy and Hooley Smith each recorded a goal, while Alec Connell played very strong in goal, as Ottawa defeated Boston 3–1. With the win, Ottawa moved three points ahead of the Toronto St. Patricks and Montreal Maroons for the final playoff spot.
- **February 7** – Ottawa was back at home to face the league leading Hamilton Tigers. Cy Denneny was the hero for the Senators, as he scored the overtime winning goal, as Ottawa defeated the Tigers 3–2. The win moved Ottawa within one point of the second place Montreal Canadiens in the NHL standings.
- **February 11** – The Senators were on the road for a game against the Montreal Canadiens. Montreal exploded for six goals in the first period to take control of the game. The Senators could never recover, as they were easily defeated by a 10–3 score. Edwin Gorman scored twice for Ottawa. For Montreal, Aurele Joliat scored three goals and added three assists, while Billy Boucher and Howie Morenz each added three goals. The loss dropped Ottawa down to fourth place, as the Toronto St. Patricks took over third place in the NHL standings.
- **February 14** – Ottawa headed back home for a match against the Montreal Maroons. The Senators, led by Georges Boucher who scored a goal and earned an assist, hung on to defeat the Maroons 3–2. Ottawa remained one point behind the Toronto St. Patricks for the final playoff spot.
- **February 18** – Ottawa headed to Toronto for a pivotal matchup against the Toronto St. Patricks, in which if the Senators could win, they could overtake Toronto for the final playoff position. Frank Nighbor and Edwin Gorman each scored for Ottawa, but a three-goal game by Babe Dye proved to be the difference, as the Senators lost 4–2 to the St. Patricks.
- **February 21** – The Senators returned home for a matchup against the Boston Bruins, desperately needing a victory. Edwin Gorman led the Senators offense with two goals and Alec Connell recorded his fifth shutout of the season, as Ottawa beat Boston 3–0.
- **February 25** – Ottawa headed on the road for a game against the first-place Hamilton Tigers, needing a win to keep their playoff chances alive. Tigers goaltender Jake Forbes stopped every shot fired at him, as Hamilton shutout the Senators 2–0. On the train ride home from Hamilton, several members of the Senators received minor injuries in a head-on train collision near Glen Tay, Ontario. They were riding a Canadian Pacific Railway train bound from Chicago to Montreal, which collided with a stationary freight train. Gill and Ahearn were in their private car, and coach Green and the players were seated in the dining car when the crash occurred.
- **February 28** – Ottawa was on home ice to face the third place Montreal Canadiens, who led Ottawa by five points for the final playoff position. In the must-win game, Alec Connell shut the door, earning his sixth shutout of the season. Georges Boucher scored the lone goal of the game, as Ottawa defeated the Canadiens 1–0.

Ottawa had a solid 5–3–0 record in February, bringing their overall win–loss record to 14–12–1 through February. The Senators 29 points ranked them fourth in the NHL standings, three points behind the third place Montreal Canadiens for the final playoff position, with three games remaining in the season.

=== March ===
- **March 4** – Ottawa was on the road to face the Montreal Maroons, trying to keep their slim playoff hopes alive. Frank Nighbor scored twice and King Clancy added two assists, as Ottawa defeated the Maroons 5–1. The Senators moved within one point of the third place Montreal Canadiens with two games remaining in the season.
- **March 7** – Ottawa returned home for their final home game of the season, facing the Toronto St. Patricks. Georges Boucher scored twice, while Alec Connell recorded his seventh shutout of the season, as Ottawa defeated Toronto 3–0. At the same time, the Montreal Canadiens defeated the Montreal Maroons 3–1, keeping Ottawa one point out of the playoff picture.
- **March 9** – Ottawa travelled for a road game against the Boston Bruins needing a victory and a Montreal Canadiens loss to qualify for the playoffs. Cy Denneny and King Clancy each scored twice for Ottawa, as they skated away with a 4–1 victory. In Montreal, the Montreal Canadiens beat the Hamilton Tigers 4–1, ending the Senators season, as the Canadiens clinched the third and final playoff position.

Ottawa had a perfect 3–0–0 record in March. Overall, the Senators had a 17–12–1 record during the season, earning 35 points. The Senators failed to qualify for the post-season.

=== Final standings ===
National Hockey League
	GP	W	L	T	GF	GA	Pts
**Hamilton Tigers**	30	19	10	1	90	60	39
**Toronto St. Patricks**	30	19	11	0	90	84	38
**Montreal Canadiens**	30	17	11	2	93	56	36
Ottawa Senators	30	17	12	1	83	66	35
Montreal Maroons	30	9	19	2	45	65	20
Boston Bruins	30	6	24	0	49	119	12

Note: W = Wins, L = Losses, T = Ties, GF = Goals For, GA = Goals Against, Pts = Points
Teams that qualified for the playoffs are highlighted in bold.

=== Record vs. opponents ===
1924–25 NHL Records
Team	BOS	HAM	MTL	MTM	OTT	TOR
Boston	—	1–5	2–4	3–3	0–6	0–6
Hamilton	5–1	—	3–3	4–2	3–2–1	4–2
M. Canadiens	4–2	3–3	—	4–0–2	3–3	3–3
M. Maroons	3–3	2–4	0–4–2	—	2–4	2–4
Ottawa	6–0	2–3–1	3–3	4–2	—	2–4
Toronto	6–0	2–4	3–3	4–2	4–2	—

== Schedule and results ==
1924–25 regular season
November: 0–1–0 (home: 0–0–0; road: 0–1–0)

Game	Date	Visitor	Score	Home	OT	Decision	Attendance	Arena	Record	Pts
1	November 29	Ottawa	3–5	Hamilton		Connell	N/A	Barton Street Arena	0–1–0	0

December: 3–4–1 (home: 1–2–1; road: 2–2–0)

Game	Date	Visitor	Score	Home	OT	Decision	Attendance	Arena	Record	Pts
2	December 3	Canadiens	1–2	Ottawa	OT	Connell	N/A	Ottawa Auditorium	1–1–0	2
3	December 6	Ottawa	1–3	Maroons		Connell	N/A	Montreal Forum	1–2–0	2
4	December 10	Toronto	6–3	Ottawa		Connell	N/A	Ottawa Auditorium	1–3–0	2
5	December 15	Ottawa	10–2	Boston		Connell	N/A	Boston Arena	2–3–0	4
6	December 17	Hamilton	0–0	Ottawa	OT	Connell	N/A	Ottawa Auditorium	2–3–1	5
7	December 20	Ottawa	2–3	Canadiens		Connell	N/A	Mount Royal Arena	2–4–1	5
8	December 23	Maroons	2–1	Ottawa		Connell	N/A	Ottawa Auditorium	2–5–1	5
9	December 27	Ottawa	4–3	Toronto		Connell	N/A	Arena Gardens	3–5–1	7

January: 6–4–0 (home: 4–2–0; road: 2–2–0)

Game	Date	Visitor	Score	Home	OT	Decision	Attendance	Arena	Record	Pts
10	January 1	Boston	2–5	Ottawa		Connell	N/A	Ottawa Auditorium	4–5–1	9
11	January 3	Hamilton	0–2	Ottawa		Connell	N/A	Ottawa Auditorium	5–5–1	11
12	January 7	Ottawa	2–0	Canadiens		Connell	N/A	Mount Royal Arena	6–5–1	13
13	January 10	Maroons	0–4	Ottawa		Connell	N/A	Ottawa Auditorium	7–5–1	15
14	January 14	Ottawa	2–3	Toronto		Connell	N/A	Arena Gardens	7–6–1	15
15	January 17	Boston	2–3	Ottawa		Connell	N/A	Ottawa Auditorium	8–6–1	17
16	January 21	Ottawa	4–5	Hamilton	OT	Connell	N/A	Barton Street Arena	8–7–1	17
17	January 24	Canadiens	3–2	Ottawa	OT	Connell	N/A	Ottawa Auditorium	8–8–1	17
18	January 28	Ottawa	2–1	Maroons	OT	Connell	N/A	Montreal Forum	9–8–1	19
19	January 31	Toronto	2–1	Ottawa		Connell	N/A	Ottawa Auditorium	9–9–1	19

February: 5–3–0 (home: 4–0–0; road: 1–3–0)

Game	Date	Visitor	Score	Home	OT	Decision	Attendance	Arena	Record	Pts
20	February 3	Ottawa	3–1	Boston		Connell	N/A	Boston Arena	10–9–1	21
21	February 7	Hamilton	2–3	Ottawa	OT	Connell	N/A	Ottawa Auditorium	11–9–1	23
22	February 11	Ottawa	3–10	Canadiens		Connell	N/A	Mount Royal Arena	11–10–1	21
23	February 14	Maroons	2–3	Ottawa		Connell	N/A	Ottawa Auditorium	12–10–1	25
24	February 18	Ottawa	2–4	Toronto		Connell	N/A	Arena Gardens	12–11–1	25
25	February 21	Boston	0–3	Ottawa		Connell	N/A	Ottawa Auditorium	13–11–1	27
26	February 25	Ottawa	0–2	Hamilton		Connell	N/A	Barton Street Arena	13–12–1	27
27	February 28	Canadiens	0–1	Ottawa		Connell	N/A	Ottawa Auditorium	14–12–1	29

March: 3–0–0 (home: 1–0–0; road: 2–0–0)

Game	Date	Visitor	Score	Home	OT	Decision	Attendance	Arena	Record	Pts
28	March 4	Ottawa	5–1	Maroons		Connell	N/A	Montreal Forum	15–12–1	31
29	March 7	Toronto	0–3	Ottawa		Connell	N/A	Ottawa Auditorium	16–12–1	33
30	March 9	Ottawa	4–1	Boston		Connell	N/A	Boston Arena	17–12–1	35

Legend: Win (2 points) Loss (0 points) Tie (1 point)

== Player statistics ==
=== Regular season ===
Scoring

Player	Pos	GP	G	A	Pts	PIM
Cy Denneny	LW	29	27	15	42	16
Hooley Smith	C/RW	30	10	13	23	81
King Clancy	D	29	14	7	21	61
Georges Boucher	D	28	15	5	20	95
Ed Gorman	D	28	11	4	15	49
Frank Nighbor	C	26	5	5	10	18
Earl Campbell	D	29	0	0	0	0
Alec Connell	G	30	0	0	0	2
Frank Finnigan	RW	29	0	0	0	22
Leth Graham	LW	3	0	0	0	0
Harry Helman	RW	1	0	0	0	0
Lionel Hitchman	D	12	0	0	0	2
Alex Smith	D	7	0	0	0	4

Goaltending

Player	MIN	GP	W	L	T	GA	GAA	SO
Alec Connell	1852	30	17	12	1	66	2.14	7
King Clancy	2	1	0	0	0	0	0.00	0
Team:	1854	30	17	12	1	66	2.14	7

Note:

Pos = Position;GP = Games played; G = Goals; A = Assists; Pts = Points; PIM = Penalty minutes; +/- = Plus/minus; PPG = Power-play goals; SHG = Short-handed goals; GWG = Game-winning goals
Pos = Position;GP = Games played; Min, TOI = Minutes played; W = Wins; L = Losses; T,T/OT = Ties; OTL = Overtime losses; GA = Goals-against; GAA = Goals-against average; SO = Shutouts; SA = Shots against; SV = Shots saved;SV% = Save percentage;

== Awards and records ==
After the season, Frank Nighbor was the first winner of the Lady Byng Trophy, awarded to the player with the best sportsmanship and gentlemanly conduct combined with performance in play.

== Transactions ==
The Senators were involved in the following transactions during the 1924–25 season.

=== Trades ===
October 20, 1924	To Ottawa Senators Cash	To Montreal Maroons Clint Benedict; Punch Broadbent
January 10, 1925	To Ottawa Senators Cash	To Boston Bruins Lionel Hitchman

=== Free agents signed ===
October 30, 1924	From Sudbury Wolves (NOHA) Joe Ironstone
October 31, 1924	From Toronto Granites (OHA) Hooley Smith
November 6, 1924	From Ottawa Montagnards (OCHL) Edwin Gorman
November 18, 1924	From Ottawa St. Brigid's (OCHL) Alec Connell
February 10, 1925	From Ottawa Rideaus (OCHL) Alex Smith

=== Free agents lost ===
January 27, 1925	To Toronto St. Patricks Rod Smylie
