= 1924–25 Hamilton Tigers season =

Professional ice hockey team season of play

1924–25 Hamilton Tigers
- League: 1st NHL
- 1924–25 record: 19–10–1
- Home record: 12–3–0
- Road record: 7–7–1
- Goals for: 90
- Goals against: 60

Team information
- General manager: Percy Thompson
- Coach: Jimmy Gardner
- Arena: Barton Street Arena

Team leaders
- Goals: Billy Burch (20)
- Assists: Red Green (16)
- Points: Red Green (35)
- Penalty minutes: Shorty Green (73)
- Wins: Jake Forbes (19)
- Goals against average: Jake Forbes (1.96)

The 1924–25 Hamilton Tigers season was the fifth and last season of the Tigers. The club won the regular season but did not play in the playoffs as the players went on strike for increased pay. NHL president Frank Calder suspended the team. In the off-season, the assets of the Tigers were sold to form the new New York Americans expansion team.

== Offseason ==
The league added two new expansion teams: the Boston Bruins and the Montreal Maroons. The Bruins became the first American-based team in the NHL.

Jimmy Gardner was named coach of the team.

== Regular season ==
=== Final standings ===
National Hockey League
	GP	W	L	T	GF	GA	Pts
**Hamilton Tigers**	30	19	10	1	90	60	39
**Toronto St. Patricks**	30	19	11	0	90	84	38
**Montreal Canadiens**	30	17	11	2	93	56	36
Ottawa Senators	30	17	12	1	83	66	35
Montreal Maroons	30	9	19	2	45	65	20
Boston Bruins	30	6	24	0	49	119	12

Note: W = Wins, L = Losses, T = Ties, GF = Goals For, GA = Goals Against, Pts = Points
Teams that qualified for the playoffs are highlighted in bold.

=== Record vs. opponents ===
1924–25 NHL Records
Team	BOS	HAM	MTL	MTM	OTT	TOR
Boston	—	1–5	2–4	3–3	0–6	0–6
Hamilton	5–1	—	3–3	4–2	3–2–1	4–2
M. Canadiens	4–2	3–3	—	4–0–2	3–3	3–3
M. Maroons	3–3	2–4	0–4–2	—	2–4	2–4
Ottawa	6–0	2–3–1	3–3	4–2	—	2–4
Toronto	6–0	2–4	3–3	4–2	4–2	—

== Playoffs ==
The Tigers players went on strike to gain an increase in pay for the longer season. After the first playoff series was completed, NHL President Calder suspended the team, awarding the championship to the first round winner. Calder imposed a fine on the players and this was paid after the franchise was sold to New York.

== Schedule and results ==
1924–25 regular season
November

Game	Result	Date	Score	Opponent	Record
1	W	November 29, 1924	5–3	Ottawa Senators (1924–25)	1–0–0

December

Game	Result	Date	Score	Opponent	Record
2	W	December 3, 1924	2–0	@ Montreal Maroons (1924–25)	2–0–0
3	W	December 5, 1924	10–3	@ Toronto St. Patricks (1924–25)	3–0–0
4	W	December 10, 1924	7–1	Boston Bruins (1924–25)	4–0–0
5	L	December 13, 1924	2–6	@ Montreal Canadiens (1924–25)	4–1–0
6	T	December 17, 1924	0–0 OT	@ Ottawa Senators (1924–25)	4–1–1
7	W	December 20, 1924	3–1	Montreal Maroons (1924–25)	5–1–1
8	W	December 25, 1924	8–1	Toronto St. Patricks (1924–25)	6–1–1
9	W	December 29, 1924	2–1	@ Boston Bruins (1924–25)	7–1–1

January

Game	Result	Date	Score	Opponent	Record
10	W	January 1, 1925	4–2	Montreal Canadiens (1924–25)	8–1–1
11	L	January 3, 1925	0–2	@ Ottawa Senators (1924–25)	8–2–1
12	L	January 7, 1925	2–6	Montreal Maroons (1924–25)	8–3–1
13	L	January 10, 1925	1–3	@ Toronto St. Patricks (1924–25)	8–4–1
14	W	January 12, 1925	4–2	@ Boston Bruins (1924–25)	9–4–1
15	W	January 17, 1925	4–2	Montreal Canadiens (1924–25)	10–4–1
16	W	January 21, 1925	5–4	Ottawa Senators (1924–25)	11–4–1
17	W	January 24, 1925	1–0	@ Montreal Maroons (1924–25)	12–4–1
18	W	January 28, 1925	4–0	Toronto St. Patricks (1924–25)	13–4–1
19	W	January 31, 1925	8–3	Boston Bruins (1924–25)	14–4–1

February

Game	Result	Date	Score	Opponent	Record
20	W	February 4, 1925	3–0	@ Montreal Canadiens (1924–25)	15–4–1
21	L	February 7, 1925	2–3	@ Ottawa Senators (1924–25)	15–5–1
22	W	February 11, 1925	3–2	Montreal Maroons (1924–25)	16–5–1
23	L	February 14, 1925	1–3	@ Toronto St. Patricks (1924–25)	16–6–1
24	W	February 17, 1925	2–1	@ Boston Bruins (1924–25)	17–6–1
25	L	February 21, 1925	1–2	Montreal Canadiens (1924–25)	17–7–1
26	W	February 25, 1925	2–0	Ottawa Senators (1924–25)	18–7–1
27	L	February 28, 1925	0–1	@ Montreal Maroons (1924–25)	18–8–1

March

Game	Result	Date	Score	Opponent	Record
28	W	March 4, 1925	3–2	Toronto St. Patricks (1924–25)	19–8–1
29	L	March 7, 1925	0–2	Boston Bruins (1924–25)	19–9–1
30	L	March 9, 1925	1–4	@ Montreal Canadiens (1924–25)	19–10–1

**Legend**: Win (2 points) Loss (0 points) Tie (1 point)

== Player statistics ==
Regular season
**Scoring**

Player	Pos	GP	G	A	Pts	PIM
Red Green	LW	30	19	15	34	81
Billy Burch	C/LW	27	20	7	27	10
Shorty Green	RW	28	18	9	27	63
Ken Randall	RW/D	30	8	10	18	52
Alex McKinnon	RW	29	8	3	11	47
Mickey Roach	C	30	6	4	10	8
Charlie Langlois	RW/D	30	6	3	9	47
Edmond Bouchard	LW/D	24	2	2	4	14
Jesse Spring	D	29	2	1	3	11
Charlie Cotch	LW	7	1	0	1	0
Jake Forbes	G	30	0	0	0	2
Goldie Prodgers	F/D	1	0	0	0	0

**Goaltending**

Player	MIN	GP	W	L	T	GA	GAA	SO
Jake Forbes	1833	30	19	10	1	60	1.96	6
Jesse Spring	2	1	0	0	0	0	0.00	0
Team:	1835	30	19	10	1	60	1.96	6

Note: Pos = Position; GP = Games played; G = Goals; A = Assists; Pts = Points; PIM = Penalty minutes
MIN = Minutes played; W = Wins; L = Losses; T = Ties; GA = Goals-against; GAA = Goals-against average; SO = Shutouts;

== Awards and records ==
- Hart Trophy – Billy Burch

== See also ==
- 1924–25 NHL season
