= 1924–25 Montreal Maroons season =

National Hockey League team season

1924–25 Montreal Maroons
- League: 5th NHL
- 1924–25 record: 9–19–2
- Home record: 5–8–2
- Road record: 4–11–0
- Goals for: 45
- Goals against: 65

Team information
- Coach: Cecil Hart; Eddie Gerard
- Captain: Punch Broadbent
- Arena: Montreal Forum

Team leaders
- Goals: Punch Broadbent (14)
- Assists: Reg Noble (11)
- Points: Punch Broadbent (20)
- Penalty minutes: Punch Broadbent (75)
- Wins: Clint Benedict (9)
- Goals against average: Clint Benedict (2.12)

The 1924–25 Montreal Maroons season was the first season of the new Maroons franchise in the National Hockey League (NHL). The club finished fifth and did not qualify for the playoffs.

== Offseason ==
This was the first season of the Montreal Maroons. Cecil Hart was hired as the first coach. But after 19 games into the season, he was replaced by former Ottawa player Eddie Gerard.

== Regular season ==
The Maroons played their first game on December 1, 1924, at Boston against the Boston Bruins and December 3, 1924, at their new home, the Montreal Forum.

=== Final standings ===
National Hockey League
	GP	W	L	T	GF	GA	Pts
**Hamilton Tigers**	30	19	10	1	90	60	39
**Toronto St. Patricks**	30	19	11	0	90	84	38
**Montreal Canadiens**	30	17	11	2	93	56	36
Ottawa Senators	30	17	12	1	83	66	35
Montreal Maroons	30	9	19	2	45	65	20
Boston Bruins	30	6	24	0	49	119	12

Note: W = Wins, L = Losses, T = Ties, GF = Goals For, GA = Goals Against, Pts = Points
Teams that qualified for the playoffs are highlighted in bold.

=== Record vs. opponents ===
1924–25 NHL Records
Team	BOS	HAM	MTL	MTM	OTT	TOR
Boston	—	1–5	2–4	3–3	0–6	0–6
Hamilton	5–1	—	3–3	4–2	3–2–1	4–2
M. Canadiens	4–2	3–3	—	4–0–2	3–3	3–3
M. Maroons	3–3	2–4	0–4–2	—	2–4	2–4
Ottawa	6–0	2–3–1	3–3	4–2	—	2–4
Toronto	6–0	2–4	3–3	4–2	4–2	—

== Schedule and results ==
1924–25 regular season
December

Game	Result	Date	Score	Opponent	Record
1	L	December 1, 1924	1–2	@ Boston Bruins (1924–25)	0–1–0
2	L	December 3, 1924	0–2	Hamilton Tigers (1924–25)	0–2–0
3	W	December 6, 1924	3–1	Ottawa Senators (1924–25)	1–2–0
4	L	December 10, 1924	0–5	@ Montreal Canadiens (1924–25)	1–3–0
5	W	December 13, 1924	3–1	@ Toronto St. Patricks (1924–25)	2–3–0
6	W	December 17, 1924	6–2	Boston Bruins (1924–25)	3–3–0
7	L	December 20, 1924	1–3	@ Hamilton Tigers (1924–25)	3–4–0
8	W	December 23, 1924	2–1	@ Ottawa Senators (1924–25)	4–4–0
9	T	December 27, 1924	1–1 OT	Montreal Canadiens (1924–25)	4–4–1

January

Game	Result	Date	Score	Opponent	Record
10	L	January 1, 1925	1–2	Toronto St. Patricks (1924–25)	4–5–1
11	W	January 3, 1925	4–3	Boston Bruins (1924–25)	5–5–1
12	W	January 7, 1925	6–2	@ Hamilton Tigers (1924–25)	6–5–1
13	L	January 10, 1925	0–4	@ Ottawa Senators (1924–25)	6–6–1
14	T	January 14, 1925	1–1 OT	Montreal Canadiens (1924–25)	6–6–2
15	W	January 17, 1925	2–1	Toronto St. Patricks (1924–25)	7–6–2
16	W	January 20, 1925	2–0	@ Boston Bruins (1924–25)	8–6–2
17	L	January 24, 1925	0–1	Hamilton Tigers (1924–25)	8–7–2
18	L	January 28, 1925	1–2	Ottawa Senators (1924–25)	8–8–2
19	L	January 31, 1925	0–5	@ Montreal Canadiens (1924–25)	8–9–2

February

Game	Result	Date	Score	Opponent	Record
20	L	February 4, 1925	2–3	@ Toronto St. Patricks (1924–25)	8–10–2
21	L	February 7, 1925	0–1	Boston Bruins (1924–25)	8–11–2
22	L	February 11, 1925	2–3	@ Hamilton Tigers (1924–25)	8–12–2
23	L	February 14, 1925	2–3	@ Ottawa Senators (1924–25)	8–13–2
24	L	February 18, 1925	0–1	Montreal Canadiens (1924–25)	8–14–2
25	L	February 21, 1925	1–2	Toronto St. Patricks (1924–25)	8–15–2
26	L	February 24, 1925	1–2	@ Boston Bruins (1924–25)	8–16–2
27	W	February 28, 1925	1–0	Hamilton Tigers (1924–25)	9–16–2

March

Game	Result	Date	Score	Opponent	Record
28	L	March 4, 1925	1–5	Ottawa Senators (1924–25)	9–17–2
29	L	March 7, 1925	1–3	@ Montreal Canadiens (1924–25)	9–18–2
30	L	March 9, 1925	0–3	@ Toronto St. Patricks (1924–25)	9–19–2

Legend: Win (2 points) Loss (0 points) Tie (1 point)

== Player statistics ==
Regular season
Scoring

Player	Pos	GP	G	A	Pts	PIM
Punch Broadbent	RW	30	14	6	20	75
Reg Noble	C/D	27	8	11	19	56
Sam Rothschild	LW	28	5	4	9	5
Dunc Munro	D	27	5	1	6	16
Louis Berlinguette	LW	29	4	2	6	22
Francis Cain	D	28	4	0	4	27
Chuck Dinsmore	C	30	2	1	3	26
Ganton Scott	RW	28	1	1	2	0
Alf Skinner	RW	17	1	1	2	16
Gerry Munro	D	30	1	0	1	37
Fred Lowrey	RW	27	0	1	1	6
Clint Benedict	G	30	0	0	0	2
George Carroll	D	5	0	0	0	2
Ernie Parkes	RW	17	0	0	0	2

Goaltending

Player	MIN	GP	W	L	T	GA	GAA	SO
Clint Benedict	1843	30	9	19	2	65	2.12	2
Dunc Munro	2	1	0	0	0	0	0.00	0
Team:	1845	30	9	19	2	65	2.11	2

Note: Pos = Position; GP = Games played; G = Goals; A = Assists; Pts = Points; PIM = Penalty minutes
MIN = Minutes played; W = Wins; L = Losses; T = Ties; GA = Goals-against; GAA = Goals-against average; SO = Shutouts;

== See also ==
- 1924–25 NHL season
