= Toronto Aura Lee =

Canadian amateur ice hockey club (1903–1926)

- City: Toronto, Ontario
- League: Ontario Hockey Association
- Operated: 1903–1926
- Home arena: Arena Gardens

The Toronto Aura Lee Hockey Club was a Canadian amateur ice hockey club in Toronto, Ontario. They were organized in 1903 at the Church of the Redeemer, and operated junior ice hockey and senior ice hockey teams in the Ontario Hockey Association (OHA) from 1916 to 1926. They were based initially near Ramsden Park where they built a clubhouse in 1906,; and later played at Arena Gardens. In January 1925, the trustees of the Aura Lee Athletic Club voted to turn their clubhouse and football grounds over to the University of Toronto.

== Junior team ==
The Aura Lee juniors won the J. Ross Robertson Cup for the OHA junior championship in 1916, 1917, 1922, and 1925.

In 1922, the Aura Lee juniors defeated the Iroquois Falls Papermakers for the Eastern title. The 1922 Memorial Cup was scheduled to be played at Shea's Amphitheatre in Winnipeg. The Canadian Amateur Hockey Association decided to save money, by having Aura Lee play the Fort William War Veterans en route to Winnipeg. Aura Lee lost that game 5–3. In 1925, the Aura Lee juniors defeated the defending Memorial Cup champions Owen Sound Greys en route to returning to the Eastern Canadian championship. They were victorious versus the Quebec Sons of Ireland in that series, and earning a berth in the national championship for the 1925 Memorial Cup. The Aura Lee juniors were defeated in two games by the Regina Patricias.

== Senior team ==
The Aura Lee senior team played in the OHA Senior A League and were finalists for the J. Ross Robertson Cup in the 1921–22 season.

== NHL and Hall of Fame alumni ==
Four alumni of the Aura Lee have been inducted into the Hockey Hall of Fame: Billy Burch, Lionel Conacher, Babe Dye and Harry Watson. Watson never played in the NHL. He was offered a professional contract, but he declined, remaining an amateur. He was inducted into the Hockey Hall of Fame in 1962. Seventeen members of the Aura Lee went on to play in the National Hockey League:

- Billy Burch
- Dutch Cain
- Lionel Conacher
- Harold Cotton
- Gerry Denoird
- Chuck Dinsmore
- Babe Dye
- Jake Forbes
- Yip Foster
- Lionel Hitchman
- Hobie Kitchen
- Alfie Moore
- John Ross Roach
- Eddie Rodden
- Ganton Scott
- Chris Speyer
- Charles Stewart
