= Ed Gorman =

Ed Gorman is the name of:

- Edwin Gorman (1892–1963), Canadian hockey player
- Ed Gorman (writer) (1941–2016), writer
