= Albert Holway =

Canadian ice hockey player

- Born: September 24, 1902 Toronto, Ontario, Canada
- Died: November 20, 1968 (aged 66) Belleville, Ontario, Canada
- Height: 6 ft 2 in (188 cm)
- Weight: 190 lb (86 kg; 13 st 8 lb)
- Position: Defence
- Shot: Left
- Played for: Montreal Maroons; Toronto St. Pats; Pittsburgh Pirates
- Playing career: 1923–1937

Albert Robert "Toots" Holway (September 24, 1902 – November 20, 1968) was a Canadian ice hockey defenceman who played 5 seasons in the National Hockey League for the Toronto St. Pats, Montreal Maroons and the Pittsburgh Pirates between 1923 and 1929. The rest of his career, which lasted from 1923 to 1937, was spent in different minor leagues.

His name was engraved on the Stanley Cup with Montreal Maroons in 1926.

== Career statistics ==
=== Regular season and playoffs ===
			Regular season					Playoffs
Season	Team	League	GP	G	A	Pts	PIM	GP	G	A	Pts	PIM
1917–18	Belleville Juniors	OHA Jr	—	—	—	—	—	—	—	—	—	—
1918–19	Belleville Juniors	OHA Jr	—	—	—	—	—	—	—	—	—	—
1919–20	Belleville Juniors	OHA Jr	—	—	—	—	—	—	—	—	—	—
1920–21	Calumet Miners	NMHL	—	—	—	—	—	—	—	—	—	—
1920–21	Belleville Juniors	OHA Jr	4	5	0	5	—	—	—	—	—	—
1920–21	Belleville Colts	OHA Int	—	—	—	—	—	1	0	0	0	0
1920–21	Belleville Juniors	M-Cup	—	—	—	—	—	5	2	0	2	—
1921–22	Belleville Juniors	OHA Jr	6	8	11	19	12	—	—	—	—	—
1921–22	Belleville Colts	OHA Int	8	5	2	7	7	7	1	1	2	8
1921–22	Belleville Juniors	M-Cup	—	—	—	—	—	2	0	0	0	0
1922–23	Belleville Colts	OHA Int	—	—	—	—	—	—	—	—	—	—
1923–24	Brockville Hockey Club	OHA Int	—	—	—	—	—	—	—	—	—	—
1923–24	Toronto St. Patricks	NHL	5	1	0	1	0	—	—	—	—	—
1924–25	Toronto St. Patricks	NHL	25	2	2	4	20	2	0	0	0	0
1925–26	Toronto St. Patricks	NHL	12	0	0	0	0	—	—	—	—	—
1925–26	Montreal Maroons	NHL	17	0	0	0	6	4	0	0	0	0
1925–26	Montreal Canadiens	St-Cup	—	—	—	—	—	2	0	0	0	0
1926–27	Montreal Maroons	NHL	13	0	0	0	2	—	—	—	—	—
1926–27	Stratford Nationals	Can-Pro	20	2	3	5	16	2	1	0	1	9
1927–28	Stratford Nationals	Can-Pro	40	3	5	8	65	5	3	0	3	11
1928–29	Pittsburgh Pirates	NHL	40	4	0	4	20	—	—	—	—	—
1929–30	London Panthers	IHL	42	8	7	15	66	2	0	0	0	2
1930–31	London Tecumsehs	IHL	48	9	3	12	68	—	—	—	—	—
1931–32	London Tecumsehs	IHL	48	4	4	8	82	6	0	0	0	26
1932–33	London Tecumsehs	IHL	43	2	10	12	101	6	0	1	1	6
1933–34	London Tecumsehs	IHL	44	3	4	7	39	6	0	0	0	2
1934–35	London Tecumsehs	IHL	32	2	4	6	23	5	0	0	0	6
1935–36	Cleveland Falcons	IHL	48	1	1	2	31	2	0	0	0	0
1936–37	Cleveland Barons	IAHL	3	0	0	0	0	—	—	—	—	—
1936–37	Seattle Seahawks	PCHL	26	0	0	0	6	—	—	—	—	—
IHL totals			305	29	33	62	410	27	0	1	1	42
NHL totals			112	7	2	9	48	6	0	0	0	0
