= Doc Stewart =

Doc Stewart may refer to:

- Charles Stewart (ice hockey) (1895–1973), Canadian ice hockey player
- E. J. Stewart (1877–1929), American football, basketball, and baseball player
