= 1924–25 Montreal Canadiens season =

NHL hockey team season

1924–25 Montreal Canadiens
- Prince of Wales Trophy winners
- O'Brien Trophy winners
- League: 3rd NHL
- 1924–25 record: 17–11–0
- Home record: 10–5–0
- Road record: 7–6–2
- Goals for: 93
- Goals against: 56

Team information
- General manager: Leo Dandurand
- Coach: Leo Dandurand
- Captain: Sprague Cleghorn
- Arena: Montreal Forum; Mount Royal Arena

Team leaders
- Goals: Aurel Joliat (30)
- Assists: Billy Boucher; Aurel Joliat; Howie Morenz (12)
- Points: Aurel Joliat (42)
- Penalty minutes: Billy Boucher (92)
- Wins: Georges Vezina (17)
- Goals against average: Georges Vezina (1.81)

The 1924–25 Montreal Canadiens season was the team's 16th season and eighth as a member of the National Hockey League (NHL). The Canadiens once again made it to the Stanley Cup Final but lost to the Victoria Cougars.

== Regular season ==
This was the first season for the Montreal Maroons and Boston Bruins – the first American NHL team. The Montreal Forum, was built to house the Maroons. However, it was the Canadiens who played in it first. The season started earlier, on November 29, and because the Mount Royal Arena couldn't produce ice, it was decided to move a game against the Toronto St. Patricks to the Forum. The Canadiens beat the St. Patricks 7–1, as Billy Boucher scored a hat trick before 8000 fans. To facilitate the change in venue, the Canadiens paid the Mount Royal Arena CA$1,000 (equivalent to $18,244 in 2025) to play at the Forum.

The Canadiens improved their scoring, scoring 93 goals in 30 games, giving up 56. Georges Vezina led the league in goals against average of 1.9 per game. All six team's starting goalie had a GAA under 4. Aurel Joliat led the Canadiens on offence, scoring 29 goals.

=== Final standings ===
National Hockey League
	GP	W	L	T	GF	GA	Pts
**Hamilton Tigers**	30	19	10	1	90	60	39
**Toronto St. Patricks**	30	19	11	0	90	84	38
**Montreal Canadiens**	30	17	11	2	93	56	36
Ottawa Senators	30	17	12	1	83	66	35
Montreal Maroons	30	9	19	2	45	65	20
Boston Bruins	30	6	24	0	49	119	12

Note: W = Wins, L = Losses, T = Ties, GF = Goals For, GA = Goals Against, Pts = Points
Teams that qualified for the playoffs are highlighted in bold.

=== Record vs. opponents ===
1924–25 NHL Records
Team	BOS	HAM	MTL	MTM	OTT	TOR
Boston	—	1–5	2–4	3–3	0–6	0–6
Hamilton	5–1	—	3–3	4–2	3–2–1	4–2
M. Canadiens	4–2	3–3	—	4–0–2	3–3	3–3
M. Maroons	3–3	2–4	0–4–2	—	2–4	2–4
Ottawa	6–0	2–3–1	3–3	4–2	—	2–4
Toronto	6–0	2–4	3–3	4–2	4–2	—

== Schedule and results ==
1924–25 regular season
November

Game	Result	Date	Score	Opponent	Record
1	W	November 29, 1924	7–1	Toronto St. Patricks (1924–25)	1–0–0

December

Game	Result	Date	Score	Opponent	Record
2	L	December 3, 1924	1–2	@ Ottawa Senators (1924–25)	1–1–0
3	W	December 8, 1924	4–3	@ Boston Bruins (1924–25)	2–1–0
4	W	December 10, 1924	5–0	Montreal Maroons (1924–25)	3–1–0
5	W	December 13, 1924	6–2	Hamilton Tigers (1924–25)	4–1–0
6	W	December 17, 1924	5–2	@ Toronto St. Patricks (1924–25)	5–1–0
7	W	December 20, 1924	3–2	Ottawa Senators (1924–25)	6–1–0
8	W	December 25, 1924	5–0	Boston Bruins (1924–25)	7–1–0
9	T	December 27, 1924	1–1 OT	@ Montreal Maroons (1924–25)	7–1–1

January

Game	Result	Date	Score	Opponent	Record
10	L	January 1, 1925	2–4	@ Hamilton Tigers (1924–25)	7–2–1
11	W	January 3, 1925	3–1	@ Toronto St. Patricks (1924–25)	8–2–1
12	L	January 7, 1925	0–2	Ottawa Senators (1924–25)	8–3–1
13	L	January 10, 1925	2–3	Boston Bruins (1924–25)	8–4–1
14	T	January 14, 1925	1–1 OT	@ Montreal Maroons (1924–25)	8–4–2
15	L	January 17, 1925	2–4	@ Hamilton Tigers (1924–25)	8–5–2
16	L	January 21, 1925	2–4	Toronto St. Patricks (1924–25)	8–6–2
17	W	January 24, 1925	3–2	@ Ottawa Senators (1924–25)	9–6–2
18	W	January 27, 1925	4–0	@ Boston Bruins (1924–25)	10–6–2
19	W	January 31, 1925	5–0	Montreal Maroons (1924–25)	11–6–2

February

Game	Result	Date	Score	Opponent	Record
20	L	February 4, 1925	0–3	Hamilton Tigers (1924–25)	11–7–2
21	L	February 7, 1925	4–5	@ Toronto St. Patricks (1924–25)	11–8–2
22	W	February 11, 1925	10–3	Ottawa Senators (1924–25)	12–8–2
23	W	February 14, 1925	5–1	Boston Bruins (1924–25)	13–8–2
24	W	February 18, 1925	1–0	@ Montreal Maroons (1924–25)	14–8–2
25	W	February 21, 1925	2–1	@ Hamilton Tigers (1924–25)	15–8–2
26	L	February 25, 1925	1–3	Toronto St. Patricks (1924–25)	15–9–2
27	L	February 28, 1925	0–1	@ Ottawa Senators (1924–25)	15–10–2

March

Game	Result	Date	Score	Opponent	Record
28	L	March 3, 1925	2–3	@ Boston Bruins (1924–25)	15–11–2
29	W	March 7, 1925	3–1	Montreal Maroons (1924–25)	16–11–2
30	W	March 9, 1925	4–1	Hamilton Tigers (1924–25)	17–11–2

Legend: Win (2 points) Loss (0 points) Tie (1 point)

== Playoffs ==
=== NHL Championship ===
The third seed Montreal Canadiens played against the second seed Toronto St. Patricks in a total goals series. The winner of that series was to go on and play the first seed team, the Hamilton Tigers. But it was not to happen that way. During the total goals series, the Hamilton players demanded CA$200 (equivalent to $3,609 in 2025) each for the extra six games played during the regular season and the league threatened to suspend the players and the team. Last-ditch efforts to reach a compromise failed and the Tigers were suspended. It was suggested that the Ottawa Senators be included in the playoffs, but St. Patricks manager Charlie Querrie and Canadiens' coach Leo Dandurand cited a fourth-place finish didn't qualify Ottawa a playoff berth and it was decided that Montreal and Toronto had played for the league title. NHL president Frank Calder announced that the Canadiens played home games at the Forum, but Leo Dandurand said that they would be played at Mount Royal Arena unless it were necessary to move to the Forum, citing home games were home games, and the Canadiens played better in front of their own fans. Calder backed down from his stand. Montreal won the series against Toronto and was awarded the Prince of Wales Trophy and earned the right to play for the Stanley Cup.

Montreal Canadiens vs. Toronto St. Patricks

Date	Team	Score	Team	Score	Notes
March 11	Montreal Canadiens	3	Toronto St. Patricks	2	
March 13	Montreal Canadiens	2	Toronto St. Patricks	0	

Montreal wins total goals series 5 goals to 2

=== Final ===
Over in the Western Canada Hockey League, the third place Victoria Cougars won their league championship and would face the Montreal Canadiens for the Stanley Cup championship. Victoria easily beat Montreal three games to one out-scoring the Canadiens 16 to 8. Games one, three and four of the series were played at the Patrick Arena in Oak Bay, a suburb municipality of Victoria, British Columbia; game two was played at the larger Denman Arena in Vancouver. This marks the first, and last, time since the inception of the NHL (1917) that a non-NHL team won the Stanley Cup. As a foot-note, the Seattle Metropolitans could have claimed the Stanley Cup during the flu-cancelled season of 1919, but chose not to as a display of good-sportsmanship.

Montreal Canadiens vs. Victoria Cougars

Date	Away	Score	Home	Score	Notes
March 21	Montreal Canadiens	2	Victoria Cougars	5	
March 23	Montreal Canadiens	1	Victoria Cougars	3	
March 27	Montreal Canadiens	4	Victoria Cougars	2	
March 30	Montreal Canadiens	1	Victoria Cougars	6	

Victoria Cougars win best-of-five series 3 games to 1 for the Stanley Cup

== Awards and records ==
- O'Brien Cup – NHL champion
- Prince of Wales Trophy – NHL champion (not awarded in 1925, but inscribed on the Trophy later)

== See also ==
- 1924–25 NHL season
