= Edwin Gorman =

Canadian ice hockey player

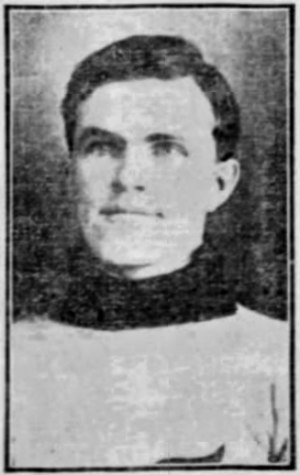
- Born: September 25, 1892 Buckingham, Quebec, Canada
- Died: March 10, 1963 (aged 70)
- Height: 6 ft 0 in (183 cm)
- Weight: 180 lb (82 kg; 12 st 12 lb)
- Position: Defence
- Shot: Left
- Played for: Ottawa Senators; Toronto Maple Leafs
- Playing career: 1913–1928

Edwin Frederick "Ed" Gorman (September 25, 1892 – March 10, 1963) was a Canadian professional ice hockey player. He played in the National Hockey League (NHL) for the Ottawa Senators and the Toronto Maple Leafs between 1924 and 1928. The rest of his career, which lasted from 1913 to 1928, was spent in minor leagues. He was a member of the 1927 Stanley Cup-winning Ottawa Senators.

== Playing career ==
Ed Gorman had a long amateur career in competitive hockey before joining the Ottawa Senators of the NHL for the 1924–25 season. Born in Buckingham, Quebec near Ottawa, he played for the Buckingham senior team from 1913 to 1915 before moving south to play for the Pittsburgh Duquesne Garden and Pittsburgh Athletic Association teams. He returned to the Ottawa area in 1917, playing for Pembroke Munitions. He then played competitive amateur hockey in the Ottawa City Hockey League from 1918 until 1924, including the Ottawa Montagnards in their try for the 1924 Allan Cup. He was signed to the Ottawa Senators in 1924, and he would play three seasons for the Senators, including their Stanley Cup championship of 1927. After the Cup win, he was traded to the Toronto Maple Leafs for cash, part of a sell-off by the financially strapped Senators. He played 19 games for Toronto before the Maple Leafs demoted him. He refused the demotion and was traded to Kitchener, Ontario of the Can-Am league. He reported and played 12 games for Kitchener before retiring from competitive hockey.

== Family ==
His great-great nephew, Ryan Kuffner, also played hockey.

== Career statistics ==
=== Regular season and playoffs ===
			Regular season					Playoffs
Season	Team	League	GP	G	A	Pts	PIM	GP	G	A	Pts	PIM
1913–14	Buckingham Seniors	MCHL	4	1	0	1	—	1	1	0	1	—
1914–15	Buckingham Seniors	MCHL	8	3	0	3	—	4	1	0	1	—
1915–16	Pittsburgh Duquesne Garden	Exhib	—	—	—	—	—	—	—	—	—	—
1916–17	Pittsburgh AA	Exhib	39	13	0	13	—	—	—	—	—	—
1917–18	Pembroke Munitions	OVHL	—	—	—	—	—	—	—	—	—	—
1918–19	Ottawa Royal Canadians	OCHL	8	1	3	4	13	—	—	—	—	—
1919–20	Ottawa Munitions	OCHL	7	1	0	1	19	5	3	5	8	—
1920–21	Ottawa St. Brigid	OCHL	11	6	0	6	—	6	2	1	3	15
1921–22	Ottawa Montagnards	OCHL	14	13	9	22	42	8	8	5	13	15
1922–23	Ottawa Montagnards	OCHL	9	4	3	7	20	2	1	0	1	4
1923–24	Ottawa Montagnards	OCHL	12	4	0	4	—	2	2	0	2	—
1923–24	Ottawa Montagnards	Al-Cup	—	—	—	—	—	4	4	1	5	—
1924–25	Ottawa Senators	NHL	28	11	4	15	51	—	—	—	—	—
1925–26	Ottawa Senators	NHL	23	2	1	3	12	2	0	0	0	2
1926–27	Ottawa Senators	NHL	41	1	0	1	17	6	0	0	0	0
1927–28	Toronto Maple Leafs	NHL	19	0	1	1	30	—	—	—	—	—
1927–28	Kitchener Millionaires	Can-Pro	12	4	1	5	20	5	0	0	0	14
NHL totals			111	14	6	20	110	8	0	0	0	2

== Transactions ==
- November 6, 1924 - Signed as a free agent by Ottawa (NHL)
- October 26, 1927 - Traded from Ottawa (NHL) to Toronto (NHL) for cash.
- February 13, 1928 - Traded from Toronto (NHL) to Kitchener (Can-Am) for cash.
