= Herb Mitchell (ice hockey) =

Canadian hockey player

- Born: January 4, 1895 Meaford, Ontario, Canada
- Died: January 12, 1969 (aged 74)
- Height: 5 ft 10 in (178 cm)
- Weight: 190 lb (86 kg; 13 st 8 lb)
- Position: Left wing
- Shot: Left
- Played for: Boston Bruins
- Playing career: 1918–1928

Herbert Alexander "Hap" Mitchell (January 4, 1895 – January 12, 1969) was a Canadian ice hockey player who played 44 games with the Boston Bruins in the National Hockey League between 1924 and 1926. The rest of his career, which lasted from 1918 to 1928, was spent in various minor leagues. He was the first head coach of the Hershey Bears after the club went professional and became a member of the American Hockey League, coaching from 1938 to 1941.

== Career statistics ==
=== Regular season and playoffs ===
			Regular season					Playoffs
Season	Team	League	GP	G	A	Pts	PIM	GP	G	A	Pts	PIM
1918–19	Hamilton Tigers	OHA Sr	—	—	—	—	—	—	—	—	—	—
1919–20	Hamilton Tigers	OHA Sr	—	—	—	—	—	—	—	—	—	—
1920–21	Hamilton Tigers	OHA Sr	—	—	—	—	—	—	—	—	—	—
1921–22	Hamilton Tigers	OHA Sr	10	5	1	6	—	—	—	—	—	—
1922–23	Hamilton Tigers	OHA Sr	12	8	8	16	—	2	1	0	1	8
1923–24	Hamilton Tigers	OHA Sr	9	10	0	10	—	2	1	0	1	—
1924–25	Boston Bruins	NHL	29	3	2	5	44	—	—	—	—	—
1925–26	Boston Bruins	NHL	26	3	0	3	16	—	—	—	—	—
1926–27	New Haven Eagles	Can-Am	30	4	3	7	18	3	0	0	0	2
1927–28	Windsor Hornets	Can-Pro	10	0	1	1	2	—	—	—	—	—
NHL totals			55	6	2	8	60	—	—	—	—	—
