= Alvin Fisher =

Canadian ice hockey player

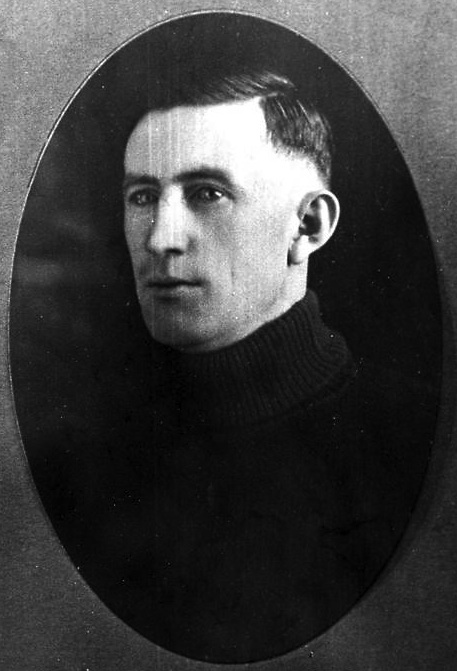
- Born: January 5, 1893 Sault Ste. Marie, Ontario, Canada
- Died: March 1, 1937 (aged 44) Ranger Lake, Ontario, Canada
- Height: 6 ft 1 in (185 cm)
- Weight: 175 lb (79 kg; 12 st 7 lb)
- Position: Right wing
- Shot: Right
- Played for: Toronto St. Pats
- Playing career: 1919–1927

Alvin Light Fisher (January 5, 1893 – March 1, 1937) was a Canadian ice hockey right winger. He played in the Western Canada, Pacific Coast and National hockey leagues for the Calgary Tigers, Seattle Metropolitans and Toronto St. Pats, respectively. He was born in Sault Ste. Marie, Ontario. Before his hockey career, he had served in the Canadian Forces during World War I, where he was wounded.

Alvin Fisher died suddenly at Ranger Lake in 1937 at the age of 44. He suffered from poor health in the preceding years including heart problems, with the cause of death on his death certificate listed as acute pericarditis. He was buried at Old Greenwood Cemetery in Sault Ste. Marie.

== Career statistics ==
=== Regular season and playoffs ===
			Regular season					Playoffs
Season	Team	League	GP	G	A	Pts	PIM	GP	G	A	Pts	PIM
1919–20	Hamilton Tigers	OHA Sr	4	0	1	1	—	2	0	0	0	0
1920–21	Sault Ste. Marie Greyhounds	NMHL	14	6	3	9	—	—	—	—	—	—
1920–21	Sault Ste. Marie Greyhounds	NOHA	9	7	1	8	12	5	1	0	1	0
1921–22	Sault Ste. Marie Greyhounds	NMHL	12	2	5	7	—	—	—	—	—	—
1921–22	Sault Ste. Marie Greyhounds	NOHA	8	2	1	3	15	2	0	1	1	2
1922–23	Calgary Tigers	WCHL	18	5	3	8	10	—	—	—	—	—
1923–24	Seattle Metropolitans	PCHA	15	1	1	2	2	2	0	0	0	0
1924–25	Toronto St. Patricks	NHL	9	1	0	1	4	—	—	—	—	—
WCHL totals			18	5	3	8	10	—	—	—	—	—
PCHA totals			15	1	1	2	2	2	0	0	0	0
NHL totals			9	1	0	1	4	—	—	—	—	—
