= Reg Reid =

Canadian ice hockey player

- Born: February 17, 1899 Seaforth, Ontario, Canada
- Died: January 14, 1986 (aged 86)
- Height: 5 ft 8 in (173 cm)
- Weight: 140 lb (64 kg; 10 st 0 lb)
- Position: Left wing
- Shot: Left
- Played for: Toronto St. Patricks
- Playing career: 1916–1931

Reginald Sutherland "Rusty" Reid (February 17, 1899 in Seaforth, Ontario - January 14, 1986) was a Canadian ice hockey player who played 2 seasons in the National Hockey League for the Toronto St. Patricks between 1924 and 1926. He also played several years in senior and minor leagues during his career, which lasted from 1916 to 1931.

== Career statistics ==
=== Regular season and playoffs ===
			Regular season					Playoffs
Season	Team	League	GP	G	A	Pts	PIM	GP	G	A	Pts	PIM
1916–17	Seaforth Hockey Club	OHA Int	—	—	—	—	—	—	—	—	—	—
1917–18	Seaforth Juniors	OHA Jr	6	18	0	18	2	—	—	—	—	—
1918–19	Seaforth Highlanders	OHA Jr	—	—	—	—	—	—	—	—	—	—
1918–19	Seaforth Hockey Club	OHA Int	—	—	—	—	—	—	—	—	—	—
1919–20	Seaforth Hockey Club	OHA Int	4	12	0	12	—	—	—	—	—	—
1920–21	Port Colborne Sailors	OHA Int	—	—	—	—	—	—	—	—	—	—
1921–22	Seaforth Hockey Club	OHA Int	6	16	0	16	4	—	—	—	—	—
1922–23	Seaforth Hockey Club	OHA Int	—	—	—	—	—	—	—	—	—	—
1923–24	Seaforth Hockey Club	OHA Int	—	—	—	—	—	—	—	—	—	—
1924–25	Toronto St. Pats	NHL	27	1	0	1	2	2	0	0	0	0
1925–26	Toronto St. Pats	NHL	12	0	0	0	2	—	—	—	—	—
1926–27	Stratford Nationals	Can-Pro	25	8	3	11	4	1	0	0	0	0
1926–27	Windsor Hornets	Can-Pro	1	0	0	0	0	—	—	—	—	—
1927–28	Stratford Nationals	Can-Pro	14	0	0	0	0	—	—	—	—	—
1929–30	Seaforth Hockey Club	OHA Int	—	—	—	—	—	—	—	—	—	—
1930–31	Stratford Nationals	OPHL	5	0	0	0	0	—	—	—	—	—
NHL totals			39	1	0	1	4	2	0	0	0	0
