= 1922 Memorial Cup =

Canadian junior ice hockey championship

The Memorial Cup trophy

The 1922 Memorial Cup final was the fourth junior ice hockey championship of the Canadian Amateur Hockey Association. The Eastern Canada champions, the Fort William War Veterans, played the Western Canada champions, Regina Patricias, for the Memorial Cup in a two-game, total goal series, at Shea's Amphitheatre in Winnipeg, Manitoba. Fort William won their first Memorial Cup, defeating Regina 8 goals to 7.

== Background ==
This was the first Memorial Cup championship played outside Toronto and was set for Shea's Amphitheatre in Winnipeg, Manitoba.

Fort William had defeated the Kenora Thistles and then played Toronto Aura Lee, winners of the George Richardson Memorial Trophy as Eastern Canadian champions, which they did in a one game playoff 5-3. To save money, the game was held in Fort William, with the winner to continue west to Winnipeg where the Memorial Cup would be contested. Toronto had expected to easily win, and there were reports their luggage had already been sent forward before their loss to Fort William. Regina, winners of the Abbott Cup as Western Canadian champions, had defeated the Calgary Hustlers in an interprovincial series, and then the University of Manitoba Junior Hockey Team in a two-game total goal series; Manitoba won the first game 4-1, while Regina won the second 5-0, winning the series with 6 goals to 4.

== Scores ==
The first game was played on March 20, 1922, and was won by Fort William 5-4. The second game was on March 22, ending in a 3-3 tie. As a result Fort William won the series on total goals, 8-7.

== Winning roster ==
Walter Adams (captain), Johnny Bates, Jerry Bourke, Ted D'Arcy, Chic Enwright, Alex Phillips, Fred Thornes, Clark Whyte. Coach: Stan Bliss
