= Charles Dinsmore =

Canadian ice hockey player (1903–1982)

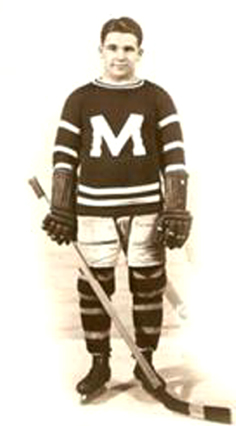
- Born: July 23, 1903 Toronto, Ontario, Canada
- Died: December 5, 1982 (aged 79) Toronto, Ontario, Canada
- Height: 5 ft 6 in (168 cm)
- Weight: 155 lb (70 kg; 11 st 1 lb)
- Position: Centre
- Shot: Left
- Played for: Montreal Maroons
- Playing career: 1924–1930

Charles Adrian Dinsmore (July 23, 1903 – December 5, 1982) was a Canadian professional ice hockey player who played 100 games in the National Hockey League with the Montreal Maroons between 1924 and 1930. Known variously as Chas, Chuck, or "Dinny" Dinsmore, he was born in Toronto, Ontario, where he played for the amateur Toronto Aura Lee Juniors hockey team and the Toronto Argonauts football team, before eventually playing pro hockey for the Montreal Maroons.

== Early life ==
Dinsmore played on high school teams for Oakwood Collegiate Institute. In 1919, he was the quarterback of their senior rugby team, which won the High School Rugby League Championship. In 1920 he was on Northview in the junior ORFU league that won the Junior title over Sarnia. He got involved in Canadian football as well as hockey, and also paddled for the Toronto Canoe Club. In 1924, he paddled in the Bala Regatta in Muskoka.

Football

Dinsmore was a halfback for the 1922 Toronto Argonauts teams with Lionel Conacher, Canada's Athlete of the Half-century. Dinsmore, "is a thick set youngster, powerful and tireless ... and he is as tough as a pineknot." The smallest man on either team, "Little Hercules" slid through the line and he picked up more loose balls than two men on either team. The team went to New York for an exhibition game, struggled with the American rules, losing 55 to 7; Dinsmore had a 32-yard run. "Dinsmore's loss was one of the most severe a team can suffer. He was one of the greatest secondary defence men ever produced in Canadian football, and his absence weakened the Argo wing line."

Hockey

In December 1919, 16 years old, he joined the Toronto Aura Lee Juniors, playing left wing and centre. Their club was on Avenue Road near Davenport. "Dinsmore is only a little fellow, but he is fast and a tricky stick handler." In 1922, Aura Lee defeated St. Mary's to be the OHA Champions. Headline in the newspapers was that Dinsmore was a "Backchecking Star." Dinsmore "roamed the whole front line breaking up rush after rush – a Trojan for work, a skating demon." And Dinsmore even scored two goals, once off the faceoff. When Kitchener was defeating Aura Lee, Dinsmore and Gerald Schnarr got into a mix-up. "Dinsmore came out with a bleeding face from a cut, and he went after Schnarr with his stick. And there was nearly a free-for-all. The police had to pull the combatants apart. Schnarr was lucky not to be badly hurt. Both were chased from the game." They won the J. Ross Robertson Cup, defeated McGill, Quebec Champions, but lost to Fort William. He was awarded a Life Membership to the Aura Lee Club.

== Professional career ==
It was Dunc Munro, Captain of the Montreal and Olympic Gold Medal team (Ice hockey at the 1924 Winter Olympics), who used to play with him on the Argos, that got him to sign with the new team Montreal Maroons. He got a no-cut three-year contract. The two also helped training the Montreal football team.

The 1924–25 season was the first for both the Maroons and the Boston Bruins, and on December 1, 1924, Dinsmore scored the first goal ever scored against the Bruins (the Bruins won the game 2-1).

In the playoff semifinal with the Pittsburgh Pirates, Maroons coach Eddie Gerard said the star of the game was Dinny Dinsmore, In the NHL championship game in Ottawa, Montreal in the third up 1-0 over the Ottawa Senators (original), finally Coach Gerard sent out "Kid Disturbance," sometimes known as Dinny Dinsmore, to break up the avalanche. He did, He grabbed the puck and heaved it down the ice and then chased down into the thinly populated backfield after it. That brought the Ottawans back ... He certainly is the prize pest of the N.H.L. The Maroons won the Stanley Cup in 1926.

Dinsmore left the game in 1928 to take a job in the financial field. But in the middle of the 1929–30 season, he asked the Maroons about getting his old job back because he said the stock market did not offer the same thrills as playing in the NHL. Montreal team officials told him that they had no more money in the budget to sign another player, but Dinsmore was insistent and struck a deal by signing a contract to play for the Maroons which would pay him one dollar for the remaining nine games. He also played in the 4 playoff games against Boston Bruins, including a 4-hour game with 45 minutes of overtime that was longest in Montreal's history until then.

In 1932, he returned to the ice as a reserve referee, but was suspended for inefficient refereeing in 1934. In 1942 he played in an old-timers benefit game for Victory Loans, Montreal Canadiens versus Maroons. He was a coach at Loyola College (Montreal) (now part of Concordia University), winning the Dominion Intermediate Intercollegiate Championships and one of the first ten named to their Hall of Fame in 1967.

Between hockey seasons, Dinsmore became a manufacturers' agent and travelled to England to get novelty lines. Later developed a welding business. He sold Dinsmore Co. in 1962 for $945,000 and in retirement played golf. He had season tickets for the Montreal Alouettes CFL team, but didn't watch hockey. In 1963 he told a reporter, "I'm strictly a one-sports rooter these days. I love football. The game has developed in so many directions and never ceases to intrigue me.... I'm sorry to say that NHL games don't catch my fancy any more. I'm one of those old fogies that was weaned on stickhandling, precision passing, and good old bodychecking. I dislike the board checking, the hooking and holding. It's just not for me, that's all."

== Career statistics ==
=== Regular season and playoffs ===
			Regular season					Playoffs
Season	Team	League	GP	G	A	Pts	PIM	GP	G	A	Pts	PIM
1919–20	Toronto Aura Lee	OHA	6	0	0	0	—	—	—	—	—	—
1920–21	Toronto Aura Lee	OHA	3	0	0	0	—	—	—	—	—	—
1921–22	Toronto Aura Lee	OHA	6	1	0	1	—	—	—	—	—	—
1922–23	Toronto Aura Lee	OHA	1	0	0	0	—	—	—	—	—	—
1923–24	Toronto Aura Lee	OHA Sr	9	4	6	10	—	—	—	—	—	—
1924–25	Montreal Maroons	NHL	30	2	1	3	26	—	—	—	—	—
1925–26	Montreal Maroons	NHL	33	3	1	4	18	4	1	0	1	2
1925–26	Montreal Maroons	St-Cup	—	—	—	—	—	4	0	0	0	2
1926–27	Montreal Maroons	NHL	28	1	0	1	6	—	—	—	—	—
1927–28	Montreal CNR	MCHL	—	—	—	—	—	—	—	—	—	—
1928–29	Montreal CNR	MCHL	—	—	—	—	—	—	—	—	—	—
1929–30	Montreal Maroons	NHL	9	0	0	0	0	4	0	0	0	0
NHL totals			100	6	2	8	50	8	1	0	1	2
