= Jimmy Herbert =

Canadian ice hockey player (1897-1968)

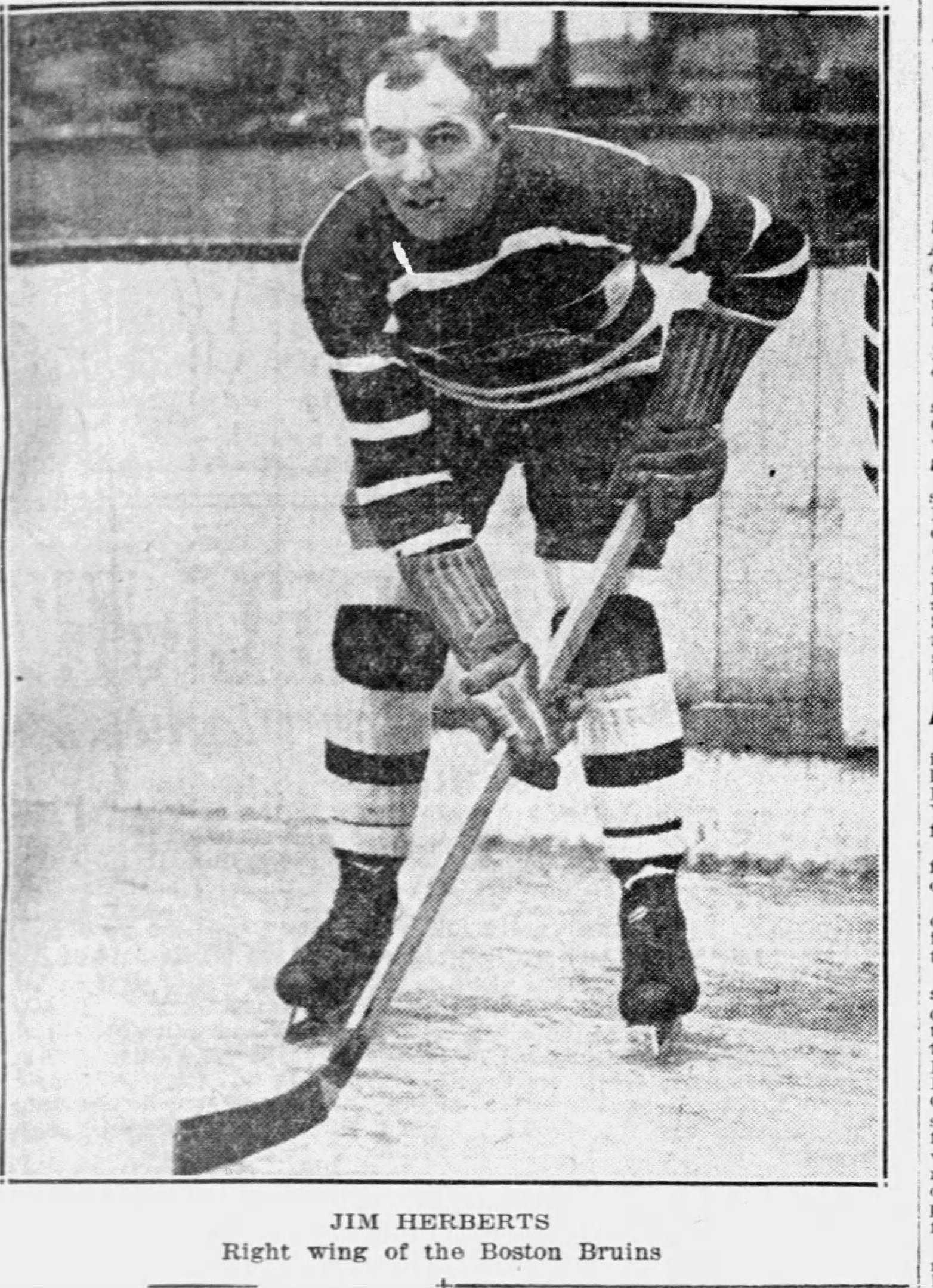
- Herbert during the 1925-26 season as a Bruin.
- Born: October 31, 1897 Cayuga, Ontario, Canada
- Died: December 5, 1968 (aged 71) Buffalo, New York, United States
- Height: 5 ft 10 in (178 cm)
- Weight: 185 lb (84 kg; 13 st 3 lb)
- Position: Centre/Right Wing
- Shot: Right
- Played for: Boston Bruins; Toronto Maple Leafs; Detroit Cougars
- Playing career: 1924–1933

James William "Sailor" Herbert (also known as Herberts) (October 31, 1897 – December 5, 1968) was a Canadian professional ice hockey player and referee. Herbert played the centre forward position for six seasons in the National Hockey League (NHL) for the Boston Bruins, Toronto Maple Leafs and Detroit Cougars. He was an original member of the Boston Bruins.

== Personal ==
Born in Cayuga, Ontario, Herbert was one of five children of John and Annie Herbert (daughter Maria, sons John, Norman, Charlie and Jimmy). Between the 1901 Census and the 1911 Census, the family moved to Collingwood, Ontario. It was in Collingwood where Jimmy played youth hockey. During his professional career, his name was consistently misspelled from his birth name of Herbert to Herberts. After he retired from active play, Herbert became a referee in the Maritime League. He also opened a tourist camp near Collingwood, Ontario. Later in the 1930s, Herbert refereed in the British Ice Hockey Association. In 1945, Herbert was reported as working in the shipyards of Halifax, Nova Scotia. Herbert died in Buffalo, New York after a long battle with cancer in 1968. Herbert's nickname of "Sailor" arose for his work as a deckhand on Great Lakes sailing ships during the off-seasons.

== Playing career ==
Herbert played senior amateur hockey from 1922 with the Hamilton Tigers of the Ontario Hockey Association (OHA), followed by a season with the Eveleth Rangers of the United States Amateur Hockey Association (USAHA). He made his professional debut with the Boston Bruins in 1924–25, scoring 17 goals in 30 games. Herbert played three and a portion of a fourth season with the Bruins before being traded to the Maple Leafs in December 1927. At the end of the 1927–28, he was traded again, to the Cougars where he played a full season and part of the 1929–30 season before being demoted to the minor pro London Panthers of the International Hockey League (IHL). He played two more full seasons in the IHL, before ending his career after nine games in the 1932–33 season.

The trade of Herbert to Toronto was attributed by Conn Smythe as the start of his feud with Art Ross, the Bruins general manager. According to Smythe, "My directors were sitting beside me the first time Herberts was sent out in a Toronto uniform and I almost fainted when he caught one of his big skates on the ice and fell flat on his face. The crowd roared with laughter, the directors moaned and I nearly fainted. When I was able to take another look at Herberts, there was our $17,000 prize beauty lining up with the visiting Chicago Black Hawks." Herbert was traded to Detroit at the end of that season.

In his rookie season of 1924–25, Herbert led the Bruins in both scoring and penalty minutes. His feat would not be matched until 1977–78 when Terry O'Reilly would lead the Bruins in scoring and penalty minutes. Herbert's top season in the NHL was 1925–26, when he scored 26 goals and 5 five assists for 31 points in 36 games.

== Career statistics ==
=== Regular season and playoffs ===
			Regular season					Playoffs
Season	Team	League	GP	G	A	Pts	PIM	GP	G	A	Pts	PIM
1922–23	Hamilton Tigers	OHA Sr	12	3	2	5	—	2	1	0	1	8
1923–24	Eveleth Reds	USAHA	19	3	0	3	—	—	—	—	—	—
1924–25	Boston Bruins	NHL	30	17	5	22	50	—	—	—	—	—
1925–26	Boston Bruins	NHL	36	26	5	31	47	—	—	—	—	—
1926–27	Boston Bruins	NHL	34	15	7	22	51	8	3	0	3	8
1927–28	Boston Bruins	NHL	18	5	0	5	23	—	—	—	—	—
1927–28	Toronto Maple Leafs	NHL	26	10	4	14	41	—	—	—	—	—
1928–29	Detroit Cougars	NHL	40	9	5	14	34	1	0	0	0	2
1929–30	Detroit Cougars	NHL	23	1	3	4	4	—	—	—	—	—
1929–30	London Panthers	IHL	1	0	0	0	0	—	—	—	—	—
1930–31	Detroit Olympics	IHL	44	14	11	25	34	—	—	—	—	—
1931–32	Detroit Olympics	IHL	43	5	5	10	34	6	0	0	0	2
1932–33	Syracuse Stars	IHL	2	0	0	0	0	—	—	—	—	—
1932–33	Windsor Bulldogs	IHL	7	2	0	2	0	—	—	—	—	—
NHL totals			207	83	29	112	250	9	3	0	3	10
