= George Carroll (ice hockey) =

Canadian ice hockey player

- Born: June 3, 1897 Moncton, New Brunswick, Canada
- Died: August 5, 1939 (aged 42)
- Height: 6 ft 2 in (188 cm)
- Weight: 209 lb (95 kg; 14 st 13 lb)
- Position: Defence
- Shot: Right
- Played for: Boston Bruins; Montreal Maroons
- Playing career: 1919–1925

George Edward Carroll (June 3, 1897 in Moncton, New Brunswick – August 5, 1939) was a Canadian professional ice hockey defenceman who played 16 games in the National Hockey League for the Montreal Maroons and Boston Bruins during the 1924–25 season. The rest of his career, which lasted from 1919 to 1925, was spent in senior leagues.

== Career statistics ==
=== Regular season and playoffs ===
			Regular season					Playoffs
Season	Team	League	GP	G	A	Pts	PIM	GP	G	A	Pts	PIM
1912–13	Moncton CNR Machinists	MCSHL	—	—	—	—	—	—	—	—	—	—
1913–14	Moncton CNR Machinists	MCSHL	7	6	0	6	—	1	1	0	1	0
1914–15	Moncton St. Bernard's	MISSL	2	0	0	0	—	—	—	—	—	—
1919–20	Moncton Victorias	MIAHL	6	3	4	7	27	11	16	6	22	25
1920–21	Moncton Victorias	MIAHL	9	5	0	5	31	2	0	0	0	0
1921–22	Moncton Victorias	MIAHL	13	12	0	12	64	—	—	—	—	—
1922–23	Moncton Victorias	MIAHL	9	1	0	1	35	2	1	0	1	4
1923–24	Moncton Victorias	MIAHL	16	10	0	10	63	—	—	—	—	—
1924–25	Montreal Maroons	NHL	5	0	0	0	2	—	—	—	—	—
1924–25	Boston Bruins	NHL	11	0	0	0	9	—	—	—	—	—
1924–25	Moncton Victorias	MIAHL	3	1	1	2	2	—	—	—	—	—
NHL totals			16	0	0	0	11	—	—	—	—	—
