= Dave Gill =

Canadian ice hockey coach and executive

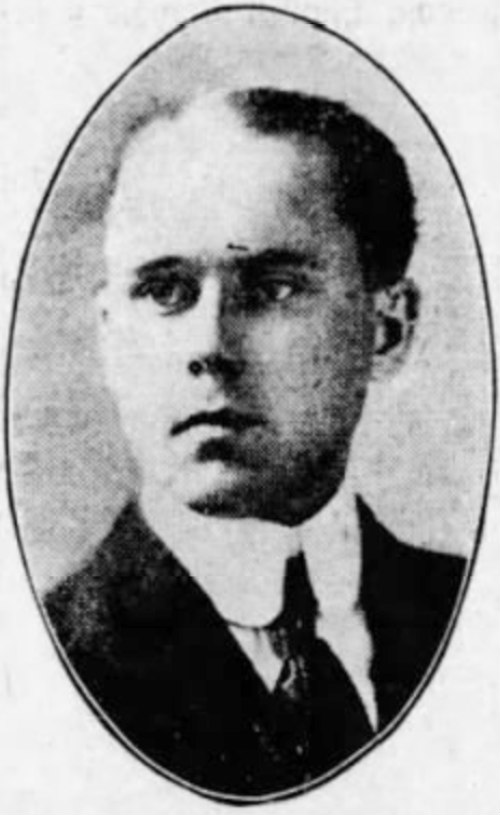
- Gill c. 1912
- Born: November 24, 1887; Grenville, Quebec, Canada
- Died: March 30, 1959 (aged 71); Ottawa, Ontario, Canada
- Occupations: Ice hockey coach and executive
- Known for: Ottawa Senators; Ottawa and District Amateur Hockey Association
- Awards: Ottawa Sport Hall of Fame

David Norman Gill (November 24, 1887 – March 30, 1959) was head coach of the original Ottawa Senators from 1926 to 1931 and a prominent Ottawa sportsman. He won the Stanley Cup in the 1926–27 season. Gill was a member of the War Canoe Club of New Edinburgh as a manager, and played rugby and hockey for that club as well as paddling. He played football for the Ottawa Rough Riders between 1912 and 1923.

He helped organize the Ottawa and District Amateur Hockey Association in 1920 and in 1925 joined the Ottawa Senators as manager, taking over as coach the following year, winning a Stanley Cup in 1927. Financial trouble necessitated the team selling off players to pay its debts and when Ottawa left the National Hockey League in 1931 for one year, he did not return to the Senators.

Gill was president of the Ottawa Rough Riders from 1954 to 1955.

He died of heart problems on March 30, 1959.

== Coaching record ==
=== National Hockey League ===
Team	Year	Regular season						Post season
Team	Year	G	W	L	T	Pts	Division rank	Result
Ottawa Senators	1926-27	44	30	10	4	64	1st in Canadian	Won division finals (5-1 vs. MTL); Won Stanley Cup (2-0-2 vs. BOS)
Ottawa Senators	1927-28	44	20	14	10	50	3rd in Canadian	Lost division semi-finals (1-3 vs. MTM)
Ottawa Senators	1928-29	44	14	17	13	41	4th in Canadian	Did not qualify
NHL totals		132	64	41	27	155	1 division title	4-2-2 (0.625)

Preceded by Alex Currie	Head Coach of the Ottawa Senators (Original); 1926–1929	Succeeded by Newsy Lalonde
