= Billy Stuart =

Canadian ice hockey player

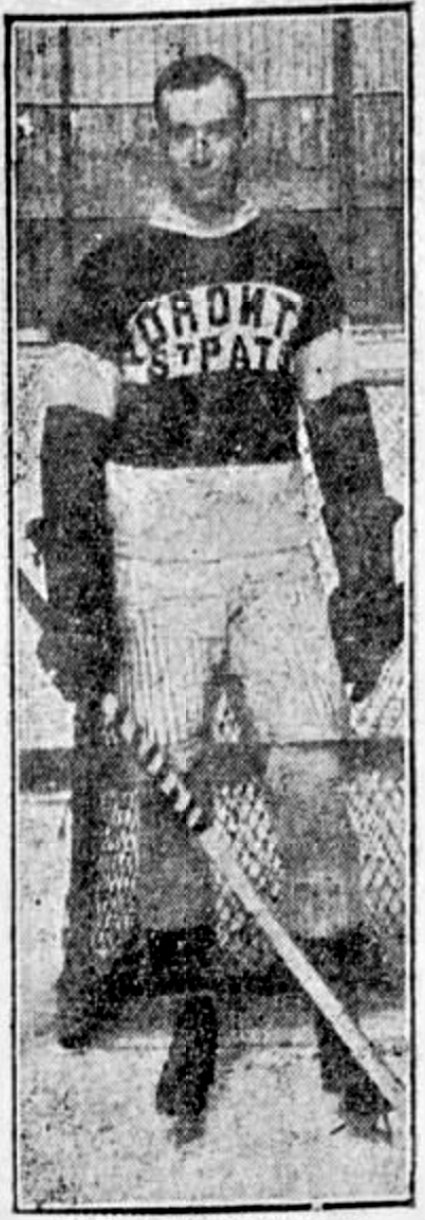
- Stuart with Toronto St. Pats
- Born: February 1, 1900 Sackville, New Brunswick, Canada
- Died: March 7, 1978 (aged 78) Amherst, Nova Scotia, Canada
- Height: 5 ft 11 in (180 cm)
- Weight: 190 lb (86 kg; 13 st 8 lb)
- Position: Defence
- Shot: Left
- Played for: Toronto St. Patricks; Boston Bruins
- Playing career: 1920–1933

William Roxborough "Red" Stuart (February 1, 1900 – March 7, 1978) was a Canadian ice hockey defenceman who played seven seasons in the National Hockey League for the Toronto St. Pats and Boston Bruins between 1920 and 1927. The rest of his career, which lasted from 1920 to 1933, was spent in different minor leagues. He won the Stanley Cup in 1922 with the St. Pats.

== Playing career ==
Stuart played hockey in Amherst, Nova Scotia, before becoming a professional with the Toronto St. Pats for the 1920–21 season. Stuart played four seasons with the St. Pats, and started a fifth before being traded to the Boston Bruins in December 1924. Stuart played three seasons for the Bruins before being traded to Minneapolis of the AHA in 1927. Stuart would play three seasons with Minneapolis. Stuart was then traded to Seattle of the PCHL, where he played a year and then played for various clubs before finishing his career with Halifax in 1933–34.

== Career statistics ==
=== Regular season and playoffs ===
			Regular season					Playoffs
Season	Team	League	GP	G	A	Pts	PIM	GP	G	A	Pts	PIM
1916–17	Amherst Ramblers	NSCHL	4	6	0	6	—	4	7	0	7	—
1917–18	Amherst Victorias	Exhib	7	8	2	10	—	5	4	3	7	—
1918–19	Springhill Miners	Exhib	5	9	3	12	—	—	—	—	—	—
1919–20	Amherst Ramblers	Exhib	6	21	3	24	18	13	30	8	38	35
1920–21	Amherst Ramblers	MIL	1	0	0	0	0	—	—	—	—	—
1920–21	Toronto St. Pats	NHL	19	2	1	3	4	2	0	0	0	0
1921–22	Toronto St. Pats	NHL	24	3	7	10	16	2	1	1	2	0
1921–22	Toronto St. Pats	St-Cup	—	—	—	—	—	5	0	2	2	6
1922–23	Toronto St. Pats	NHL	23	7	3	10	16	—	—	—	—	—
1923–24	Toronto St. Pats	NHL	24	4	3	7	22	—	—	—	—	—
1924–25	Toronto St. Pats	NHL	4	0	1	1	2	—	—	—	—	—
1924–25	Boston Bruins	NHL	25	5	3	8	30	—	—	—	—	—
1925–26	Boston Bruins	NHL	33	6	1	7	41	—	—	—	—	—
1926–27	Boston Bruins	NHL	43	3	1	4	20	8	0	0	0	6
1927–28	Minneapolis Millers	AHA	39	5	2	7	80	7	1	0	1	12
1928–29	Minneapolis Millers	AHA	39	17	6	23	87	4	0	2	2	6
1929–30	Minneapolis Millers	AHA	48	12	8	20	70	—	—	—	—	—
1930–31	Seattle Eskimos	PCHL	34	5	8	13	20	4	0	1	1	14
1931–32	Duluth Hornets	AHA	48	15	2	17	56	8	0	1	1	!0
1932–33	Minneapolis Millers	CHL	39	3	1	4	37	7	1	1	2	6
1933–34	Halifax Wolverines	NSSHL	—	—	—	—	—	—	—	—	—	—
AHA totals			174	49	18	67	293	19	1	3	4	28
NHL totals			195	30	20	50	151	12	1	1	2	6
