= Billy Burch =

Canadian ice hockey player (1900–1950)

- Hockey Hall of Fame, 1974
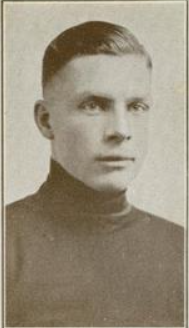
- Born: November 20, 1900 Yonkers, New York, U.S.
- Died: November 30, 1950 (aged 50) Toronto, Ontario, Canada
- Height: 6 ft 0 in (183 cm)
- Weight: 200 lb (91 kg; 14 st 4 lb)
- Position: Centre
- Shot: Left
- Played for: Hamilton Tigers; New York Americans; Boston Bruins; Chicago Black Hawks
- Playing career: 1922–1933

Harry Wilfred Burch (November 20, 1900 – November 30, 1950) was an American-born Canadian professional ice hockey forward who played in the National Hockey League (NHL) for the Hamilton Tigers, New York Americans, Chicago Black Hawks, and Boston Bruins. Born in Yonkers, New York, Burch grew up in Toronto and scored 42 goals in 12 Memorial Cup playoff games to lead the Toronto Canoe Club Paddlers to the 1920 Canadian junior championship.

Burch won the Hart Trophy as the NHL's most valuable player in 1924–25. In that same season, he joined his teammates in precipitating the first player's strike in NHL history and which led to the dissolution of the Hamilton franchise. Transferring to the newly formed New York franchise, Burch served as the team's captain, scored the first goal in Americans' history in 1925 and won the Lady Byng Trophy in 1926–27 as the NHL's most gentlemanly player. He was inducted into the Hockey Hall of Fame in 1974.

== Early life ==
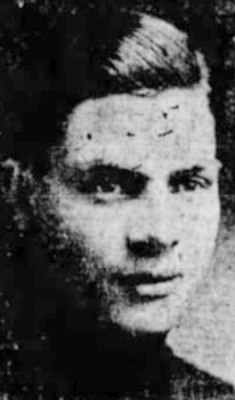
Burch in early photo

Burch was born on November 20, 1900, in Yonkers, New York, but moved to Toronto at a young age and grew up in the Ontario capital as a multi-sport athlete playing lacrosse, football and hockey. In football, Burch played quarterback for the Toronto Central YMCA team that won the provincial junior championship in 1920. That same year he was a teammate of Lionel Conacher and Roy Worters with the Toronto Canoe Club Paddlers hockey team which won the 1920 Memorial Cup as the Dominion champions of Canada. Burch led all players in the Memorial Cup playoffs with 42 goals, 12 assists and 54 points in 12 games. He spent the following two seasons with the Toronto Aura Lee team in the Ontario Hockey Association.

== NHL career ==
After beginning the 1922–23 season with the Westminster Hockey Club in the United States Amateur Hockey Association, Burch was signed to a contract by the Hamilton Tigers on January 30, 1923. He joined a Tigers team that was last in the four-team NHL, but which improved as he did. After scoring six goals in ten games to finish that season, Burch finished in a tie for third in NHL scoring in 1923–24 with 22 points. The Tigers finished 1924–25 as the regular season champions with a 19–10–1 record, and Burch was voted the winner of the Hart Trophy as the league's most valuable player following a 20-goal regular season.

The NHL had expanded by two teams that season and the schedule increased from 24 to 30 games, however Burch and his teammates were not paid any extra compensation by the Tigers. In protest, the players demanded that the team and league pay each individual $200 for the additional regular season and playoff games, or they would refuse to play the NHL championship series. After defying an order by league president Frank Calder to play, the team was disqualified and the Montreal Canadiens, who won the semi-final series, were declared league champions. The Tigers' actions constituted the first player's strike in NHL history. The Tigers franchise was sold and relocated for the 1925–26 season.

The franchise became the New York Americans, and Burch was named the team's captain, a position he would hold until 1932. The team played up his New York birth; he was dubbed both "Yonkers Billy Burch" and "the Babe Ruth of hockey". Burch scored the first goal in Americans' franchise history on December 2, 1925, in a 2–1 victory over the Pittsburgh Pirates, and finished the season eighth in league scoring with 25 points. He again finished eighth in scoring, with 27 points, in 1926–27, and was voted the winner of the Lady Byng Trophy, awarded for his "effectiveness and a true sporting spirit".

Following a last-place finish in the Canadian Division, the Americans revamped their roster for the 1928–29 season. Of the team's regulars the past season, only Burch and Lionel Conacher were retained. Burch scored 11 goals and 16 points for New York and played the only two playoff games of his NHL career after the team improved to a second-place finish. He scored only 10 points in 1929–30 before improving to 22 points in each of the following two campaigns. Approaching the end of his career, Burch was sold by New York to the Boston Bruins prior to the 1932–33 season. However, he did not see much playing time in Boston in the first part of the season and on January 17, 1933, was traded to the Chicago Black Hawks in exchange for Vic Ripley. Burch suffered a broken leg at the end of the season which spelled the end of his playing career. Burch was the last active NHL player who had played with the Hamilton Tigers.

Burch retired to Toronto, where he died in 1950. Montreal Gazette sportswriter Tommy Shields praised Burch as a quality NHL player: "He broke in and played in the days when the going was rough and a player had to be good to stick. If you didn't make it, there was no going back to the amateur ranks. Billy turned pro and never looked back. He was a major leaguer all the way." He was posthumously inducted into the Hockey Hall of Fame in 1974.

== Career statistics ==
=== Regular season and playoffs ===
			Regular season					Playoffs
Season	Team	League	GP	G	A	Pts	PIM	GP	G	A	Pts	PIM
1919–20	Toronto Canoe Club Paddlers	OHA Jr.	—	—	—	—	—	12	42	12	54	—
1920–21	Toronto Aura Lee	OHA Sr.	10	12	2	14	—	—	—	—	—	—
1921–22	Toronto Aura Lee	OHA Jr.	9	13	10	23	—	2	2	1	3	—
1922–23	Westminster Hockey Club	USAHA	—	4	0	4	—	—	—	—	—	—
1922–23	Hamilton Tigers	NHL	10	6	3	9	4	—	—	—	—	—
1923–24	Hamilton Tigers	NHL	24	16	6	22	6	—	—	—	—	—
1924–25	Hamilton Tigers	NHL	27	20	7	27	10	—	—	—	—	—
1925–26	New York Americans	NHL	36	22	3	25	33	—	—	—	—	—
1926–27	New York Americans	NHL	43	19	8	27	40	—	—	—	—	—
1927–28	New York Americans	NHL	32	10	2	12	34	—	—	—	—	—
1928–29	New York Americans	NHL	44	11	5	16	45	2	0	0	0	0
1929–30	New York Americans	NHL	35	7	3	10	22	—	—	—	—	—
1930–31	New York Americans	NHL	44	14	8	22	35	—	—	—	—	—
1931–32	New York Americans	NHL	48	7	15	22	20	—	—	—	—	—
1932–33	Boston Bruins	NHL	23	3	1	4	4	—	—	—	—	—
1932–33	Chicago Black Hawks	NHL	24	2	0	2	2	—	—	—	—	—
NHL totals			390	137	61	198	255	2	0	0	0	0

== Awards and honours ==
National Hockey League
Award	Year	Ref.
Hart Trophy	1924–25	
Lady Byng Trophy	1926–27	

Preceded by Position created	New York Americans captain 1925–32	Succeeded by Red Dutton
Preceded by Frank Nighbor	Winner of the Hart Trophy; 1925	Succeeded by Nels Stewart
Preceded by Frank Nighbor	Winner of the Lady Byng Memorial Trophy; 1927	Succeeded by Frank Boucher
