= Jake Forbes (ice hockey) =

Canadian ice hockey player

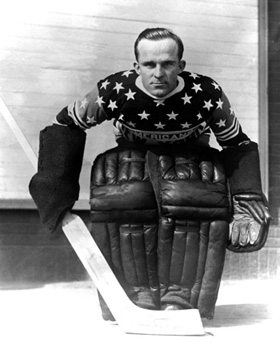
- Jake Forbes New York Americans circa 1925–30
- Born: July 4, 1897 Toronto, Ontario, Canada
- Died: December 30, 1985 (aged 88) Hamilton, Ontario, Canada
- Height: 5 ft 6 in (168 cm)
- Weight: 141 lb (64 kg; 10 st 1 lb)
- Position: Goaltender
- Caught: Left
- Played for: Toronto St. Patricks; Hamilton Tigers; New York Americans; Philadelphia Quakers
- Playing career: 1919–1936

Vernon Vivian "Jake, Jumpin' Jackie" Forbes (July 4, 1897 – December 30, 1985) was a Canadian ice hockey goaltender who played thirteen seasons in the National Hockey League for the Toronto St. Patricks, Hamilton Tigers, New York Americans and Philadelphia Quakers. He also played several years in different minor leagues, retiring in 1936. He is notable for being the first NHL player to sit out a season over a contract dispute.

== Playing career ==
Nicknamed "Jumpin' Jackie", Forbes was involved in the infamous 1925 Hamilton Tigers players' strike. Before becoming involved in the players strike, Forbes played for the Toronto St. Patricks and sat out the entire 1921–22 NHL season while holding out for a $2500 salary. In doing so, Forbes became the first NHL player to sit out an entire season due to a contract dispute. His contract was then sold to Hamilton after the season ended. He spent most of his career with the Hamilton Tigers/New York Americans franchise. After getting into two playoff games in 1921, his first full season, he never played another post-season game despite not retiring from the league for another twelve years. His only other opportunity at winning a Stanley Cup was foiled by the Hamilton players strike. In his NHL career, he finished with 84 wins, 114 losses and 11 ties, with a 2.76 goals against average (GAA).

He was the last surviving former player of the Hamilton Tigers.

== Career statistics ==
=== Regular season and playoffs ===
			Regular season								Playoffs
Season	Team	League	GP	W	L	T	Min	GA	SO	GAA	GP	W	L	T	Min	GA	SO	GAA
1916–17	Toronto Aura Lee	OHA	6	6	0	0	360	14	0	2.33	6	4	2	0	360	18	0	3.00
1917–18	Toronto Aura Lee	OHA	4	3	1	0	240	13	0	3.25	—	—	—	—	—	—	—	—
1918–19	Toronto Goodyears	TIHL	—	—	—	—	—	—	—	—	—	—	—	—	—	—	—	—
1919–20	Toronto Aura Lee	OHA	—	—	—	—	—	—	—	—	—	—	—	—	—	—	—	—
1919–20	Toronto Goodyears	TIHL	—	—	—	—	—	—	—	—	—	—	—	—	—	—	—	—
1919–20	Toronto St. Pats	NHL	5	2	3	0	300	21	0	4.20	—	—	—	—	—	—	—	—
1920–21	Toronto St. Pats	NHL	20	13	7	0	1221	78	0	3.83	2	0	2	0	120	7	0	3.50
1922–23	Hamilton Tigers	NHL	24	6	18	0	1470	110	0	4.49	—	—	—	—	—	—	—	—
1923–24	Hamilton Tigers	NHL	24	9	15	0	1483	68	1	2.75	—	—	—	—	—	—	—	—
1924–25	Hamilton Tigers	NHL	30	19	10	1	1834	60	6	1.96	—	—	—	—	—	—	—	—
1925–26	New York Americans	NHL	36	12	20	4	2240	86	2	2.30	—	—	—	—	—	—	—	—
1926–27	New York Americans	NHL	44	17	25	2	2715	91	8	2.01	—	—	—	—	—	—	—	—
1927–28	New York Americans	NHL	16	3	11	2	980	51	2	3.12	—	—	—	—	—	—	—	—
1927–28	Providence Reds	Can-Am	13	—	—	—	780	20	2	1.46	—	—	—	—	—	—	—	—
1927–28	Niagara Falls Cataracts	Can-Pro	8	—	—	—	480	16	1	2.00	—	—	—	—	—	—	—	—
1928–29	New York Americans	NHL	1	1	0	0	60	3	0	3.00	—	—	—	—	—	—	—	—
1928–29	New Haven Eagles	Can-Am	26	—	—	—	1560	29	9	1.06	2	1	1	0	123	4	0	1.95
1929–30	New York Americans	NHL	1	0	0	1	70	1	0	0.86	—	—	—	—	—	—	—	—
1929–30	New Haven Eagles	Can-Am	40	—	—	—	2400	101	3	2.44	—	—	—	—	—	—	—	—
1930–31	New Haven Eagles	Can-Am	40	—	—	—	—	—	3	3.37	—	—	—	—	—	—	—	—
1930–31	Philadelphia Quakers	NHL	2	0	0	2	120	7	0	3.50	—	—	—	—	—	—	—	—
1931–32	New York Americans	NHL	6	3	3	0	360	16	0	2.67	—	—	—	—	—	—	—	—
1931–32	Springfield Indians	Can-Am	3	—	—	—	180	16	0	5.05	—	—	—	—	—	—	—	—
1931–32	Bronx Tigers	Can-Am	7	—	—	—	420	16	0	2.09	—	—	—	—	—	—	—	—
1932–33	New York Americans	NHL	1	0	0	1	70	2	0	1.71	—	—	—	—	—	—	—	—
1932–33	New Haven Eagles	Can-Am	5	—	—	—	300	15	0	3.11	—	—	—	—	—	—	—	—
1933–34	Windsor Bulldogs	IHL	36	—	—	—	2160	89	6	2.41	—	—	—	—	—	—	—	—
1934–35	Syracuse Stars	IHL	8	5	3	0	510	21	0	2.47	—	—	—	—	—	—	—	—
1934–35	London Tecumsehs	IHL	8	4	3	1	500	20	0	2.40	5	2	3	0	320	12	1	2.25
1935–36	Rochester Cardinals	IHL	5	2	3	0	300	20	0	4.00	—	—	—	—	—	—	—	—
1935–36	Syracuse Stars	IHL	5	2	3	0	330	15	0	2.73	—	—	—	—	—	—	—	—
NHL totals			210	85	114	11	12923	594	19	2.76	2	0	2	0	120	7	0	3.50
