= Charles Stewart (ice hockey) =

Canadian ice hockey player (1895–1973)

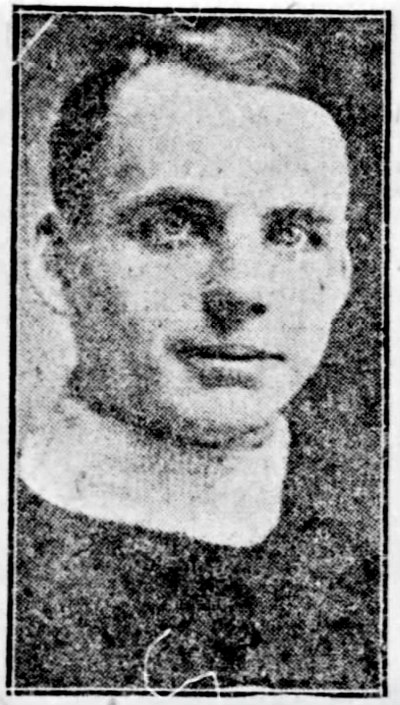
- Stewart with the Hamilton Tigers.
- Born: November 13, 1895 Carleton Place, Ontario, Canada
- Died: January 23, 1973 (aged 77)
- Height: 5 ft 7 in (170 cm)
- Weight: 140 lb (64 kg; 10 st 0 lb)
- Position: Goaltender
- Caught: Left
- Played for: Toronto Dentals; Hamilton Tigers; Boston Bruins
- Playing career: 1924–1927

Charles Elmer "Doc" Stewart (November 13, 1895 – January 23, 1973) was a Canadian professional ice hockey goaltender who played for the Boston Bruins of the National Hockey League between 1924 and 1927.

== Playing career ==
Stewart was born in Carleton Place, Ontario. After a junior career with the Kingston Collegiate Institute of the Ontario Hockey Association, Stewart starred in senior hockey for several teams in the OHA from 1914 to 1924, most notably for the Toronto Dentals for four seasons while undergoing medical training, being named to the league's Second All-Star Team in 1918 and the First All-Star Team in 1919. During that time, he enlisted in the Canadian Army Dental Corps in 1917, being commissioned as a lieutenant, and assigned to Battalion M. D. No. 2; he did not see overseas service before war's end.

With the Hamilton Tigers' OHA senior amateur team in 1922, 1923 and 1924, Stewart was named the First Team All-Star goaltender all three seasons.

The Boston Bruins began play in 1924 and losing eight of their first nine games, often by wide margins, and desperate for goaltending, signed Stewart to a contract. He played the rest of the schedule for Boston, winning five out of twenty-one games for the weak club, adding two shutouts. He remained the Bruins' goaltender for two more seasons, his best record coming in 1926, when he had a 16-14-4 record with six shutouts and a 2.21 goals against average.

Late in the 1927 season, the Bruins loaned Stewart to the Hamilton Tigers of the Canadian-American Hockey League, with whom he played nine games to finish his hockey career.

Stewart finished his NHL career with a 30-41-5 record and ten shutouts in 77 games, recording a 2.45 goals against average. His career goals against average is fifth best in Boston Bruins' history for any goaltender playing 75 games or more.

== Personal life ==
Stewart's parents were Thomas H. and Bessie Allan Stewart. In 1926 he married Ida M. Dawson of Hamilton, Ontario.

His older brother was dentist and politician Harry Allan Stewart.

He graduated from the Royal College of Dental Surgeons in 1919, and practiced dentistry in the offseason thereafter.

== Career statistics ==
=== Regular season and playoffs ===
			Regular season								Playoffs
Season	Team	League	GP	W	L	T	Min	GA	SO	GAA	GP	W	L	T	Min	GA	SO	GAA
1912–13	Kingston Collegiate	OHA	—	—	—	—	—	—	—	—	—	—	—	—	—	—	—	—
1913–14	Kingston Collegiate	OHA	6	4	2	0	360	40	0	6.67	—	—	—	—	—	—	—	—
1914–15	Kingston Frontenacs	OHA Sr	—	—	—	—	—	—	—	—	—	—	—	—	—	—	—	—
1915–16	Toronto Argonauts	OHA Sr	3	2	1	0	180	8	0	2.67	2	0	1	1	112	7	0	3.75
1916–17	Toronto Dentals	OHA Sr	10	7	2	1	620	26	2	2.52	4	4	0	0	280	8	0	3.75
1917–18	Toronto Dentals	OHA Sr	9	9	0	0	540	35	0	3.89	2	0	1	1	118	7	0	3.56
1918–19	Toronto Dentals	OHA Sr	7	5	2	0	420	27	0	3.86	2	1	1	0	120	6	0	3.00
1919–20	Toronto Dentals	OHA Sr	6	3	3	0	390	24	0	3.69	—	—	—	—	—	—	—	—
1920–21	Toronto Aura Lee	OHA Sr	9	3	5	0	529	22	1	2.50	—	—	—	—	—	—	—	—
1921–22	Hamilton Tigers	OHA Sr	9	4	4	1	570	34	0	3.56	—	—	—	—	—	—	—	—
1922–23	Hamilton Tigers	OHA Sr	12	9	2	0	699	28	1	2.40	2	0	1	1	120	6	0	3.00
1923–24	Hamilton Tigers	OHA Sr	10	9	1	0	620	26	0	2.52	6	4	2	0	358	16	0	2.68
1924–25	Boston Bruins	NHL	21	5	16	0	1266	65	2	3.08	—	—	—	—	—	—	—	—
1925–26	Boston Bruins	NHL	35	16	14	4	2172	80	6	2.21	—	—	—	—	—	—	—	—
1926–27	Boston Bruins	NHL	21	9	11	1	1304	49	2	2.25	—	—	—	—	—	—	—	—
1926–27	Hamilton Tigers	OHA Sr	9	4	4	1	541	16	1	1.77	—	—	—	—	—	—	—	—
NHL totals			77	30	41	5	4742	194	10	2.45	—	—	—	—	—	—	—	—
