= 1924–25 NHL season =

Professional ice hockey league season

- League: National Hockey League
- Sport: Ice hockey
- Duration: November 29, 1924 – March 13, 1925
- Games: 30
- Teams: 6

Regular season
- Season champions: Hamilton Tigers
- Season MVP: Billy Burch (Tigers)
- Top scorer: Babe Dye (St. Patricks)

O'Brien Cup
- Champions: Montreal Canadiens
- Runners-up: Toronto St. Patricks

NHL seasons
- ← 1923–24 1925–26 →

The 1924–25 NHL season was the eighth season of the National Hockey League. The NHL added two teams this season, a second team in Montreal, the Montreal Maroons and the first U.S. team, the Boston Bruins. Six teams played 30 games each.

The NHL regular-season champion Hamilton Tigers did not participate in the playoffs, as their players demanded to their owner, Percy Thompson, that they would not participate in the NHL championship series unless they received an additional $200 each for the extra six games played that year. Under their contracts, the Tigers players were to receive the same amount of money no matter how many games they played from December 1, 1924, to March 31, 1925 (even though the season started on November 29, 1924). NHL President Frank Calder was not amused, stating that the players would be fined or suspended if they did not play in the final series, but the players stated that they would rather retire than advantage be taken of them. The day of the final game of the Semi-Final, Tiger Shorty Green met with Calder to try to reach an agreement, but to no avail. The players were all suspended and fined $200 each, therefore eliminating themselves from the playoffs.

Because of the suspension, the semi-final playoff series between Montreal and Toronto became the NHL championship series. The Montreal Canadiens won the series and faced off against the Victoria Cougars of the Western Canada Hockey League (WCHL) for the Stanley Cup. Victoria won the series, the last non-NHL team to win the Cup.

== League business ==
Prior to the start of this hockey season, the Pacific Coast Hockey Association folded and two of its teams, the Vancouver Maroons and Victoria Cougars, joined the Western Canada Hockey League. This meant that after three seasons of having three leagues compete for the Stanley Cup, there were once again only two.

At the November 1924 NHL meeting, the NHL approved two new franchises, including its first franchise in the United States of America. Charles Adams of Boston was granted a franchise. The NHL also granted a second franchise for Montreal to James Strachan and Donat Raymond. Applications from New York City, Pittsburgh and Philadelphia were shelved.

In January 1925, Tommy Gorman and Ted Dey sold their interests in the Ottawa Senators to T. Franklin Ahearn. Ahearn then hired amateur hockey executive, Dave Gill, to be secretary-treasurer (general manager) of the team.

A new trophy was added for the 1924–25 NHL season. The original Lady Byng Trophy was donated by Lady Byng, wife of Governor General Viscount Byng of Vimy, to be handed out to the player who showed the best sportsmanship and gentlemanly conduct combined with performance in play. She presented it to Frank Nighbor of the Ottawa Senators.

== Arena changes ==
- The expansion Boston Bruins moved into Boston Arena.
- The expansion Montreal Maroons moved into the Montreal Forum.

== Regular season ==
This was the first season for the Montreal Maroons and Boston Bruins, the Bruins becoming the first American NHL team. It was also the last season for the Hamilton Tigers, which would dissolve at season's end. The number of games played per team was increased from 24 to 30.

The first game the League ever played on United States soil was the first game for the Bruins, who hosted the Maroons on December 1, 1924.

A new arena, the Montreal Forum, was built to house the Maroons. However, the Montreal Canadiens played in it first. Because the Canadiens' home rink, Mount Royal Arena, couldn't produce ice, the November 29 home opener against the Toronto St. Patricks was moved to the Forum. The Canadiens beat the St. Patricks 7–1, before 9,000 fans. an NHL attendance record of 11,000 was set on December 27, when the Maroons hosted the Canadiens.

The Maroons actually had no official nickname their first season. However, fans took to the deep crimson uniforms they wore and called them the Maroons, and the team leaned on two former Ottawa Senators, Punch Broadbent and Clint Benedict they picked up from Ottawa before the season but still managed only fifth place. Broadbent scored a pair of goals in the Maroons' first ever victory, a 3–1 victory over Ottawa at the Forum in Montreal. Broadbent scored five goals in a game on January 7 as Montreal defeated the Tigers 6–2 in the Abso-Pure rink in Hamilton.

On December 17, goaltenders Jake Forbes of Hamilton and Alex Connell of Ottawa engaged in the first ever scoreless tie in a regular season game in NHL history.

Just before the end of the season, the Bruins, which finished in last place, had a modest winning streak. First, they beat the Montreal Canadiens 3–2 March 3. Normand Shay scored the winning goal on a two on one break at 16:39 of the third period as Jimmy Herbert shot and then Shay pounced on the rebound and put it by Georges Vezina. The game was rough and referee Jerry Laflamme meted out quite a few penalties, including four minors to Lionel Hitchman of Boston. Howie Morenz starred in a losing cause with two goals. The Bruins then defeated the league-leading Hamilton Tigers 2–0 in their next game as Doc Stewart played well in goal.

=== Final standings ===
National Hockey League
	GP	W	L	T	GF	GA	Pts
**Hamilton Tigers**	30	19	10	1	90	60	39
**Toronto St. Patricks**	30	19	11	0	90	84	38
**Montreal Canadiens**	30	17	11	2	93	56	36
Ottawa Senators	30	17	12	1	83	66	35
Montreal Maroons	30	9	19	2	45	65	20
Boston Bruins	30	6	24	0	49	119	12

Note: W = Wins, L = Losses, T = Ties, GF = Goals For, GA = Goals Against, Pts = Points
Teams that qualified for the playoffs are highlighted in bold.

== Playoffs ==
The Pacific Coast Hockey Association folded prior to the 1924–25 season, leaving only the NHL and the Western Canada Hockey League competing for the Stanley Cup. This marked the last time until 2020 that the playoffs were played entirely in Canada.

=== NHL Championship ===
With an increase in the number of NHL teams, the NHL changed its O'Brien Cup playoff format by having the second- and third- place teams play a two-game total-goals series to see who played the number one seed in another two-game total-goals for the NHL championship.

However, players on the first-place Hamilton Tigers demanded $200 each for the extra six games played during the regular season and the league threatened to suspend the players and the team. Last-ditch efforts to reach a compromise failed and the Tigers were suspended. It was suggested that the Ottawa Senators be included in the playoffs, but Toronto General Manager Charlie Querrie and Montreal owner Leo Dandurand cited a fourth-place finish did not qualify Ottawa a playoff berth. Thus, the series between second-place Toronto and third-place Montreal would determine the NHL title.

During the Toronto–Montreal series, NHL president Frank Calder announced that the Canadiens would playe their home games at the Forum, but Dandurand said that they would be played at Mount Royal Arena unless it were necessary to move to the Forum, citing home games were home games, and the Canadiens played better in front of their own fans. Calder backed down from his stand. Montreal won the series against Toronto and earned the right to play for the Stanley Cup. Early in the following 1925–26 season, when they were given placeholder possession of the new Prince of Wales Trophy – which duplicated the O'Brien Cup as an award for the NHL playoff championship – the Canadiens retroactively engraved this 1925 championship on the new trophy.

March 11	Toronto St. Patricks	2–3	Montreal Canadiens	Mount Royal Arena	Recap
Bert McCaffrey (1) - 14:10		First period	No scoring
No scoring		Second period	6:00 - Howie Morenz (1); 19:00 - pp - Howie Morenz (2)
Jack Adams (1) - 4:30		Third period	4:00 - Billy Boucher (1)
John Ross Roach		Goalie stats	Georges Vezina

March 13	Montreal Canadiens	2–0	Toronto St. Patricks	Arena Gardens	Recap
Sprague Cleghorn (1) - 9:15		First period	No scoring
No scoring		Second period	No scoring
Howie Morenz (3) - 19:35		Third period	No scoring
Georges Vezina		Goalie stats	John Ross Roach

Montreal won the series on total goals 5–2

=== Stanley Cup Finals ===
In the Western Canada Hockey League, the third place Victoria Cougars won its league championship and faced the Montreal Canadiens for the Stanley Cup. The series was played in Patrick Arena in Victoria, except for game two, which was played at Denman Arena in Vancouver to gather greater fan support and more income. Victoria beat Montreal three games to one, out-scoring the Canadiens 16 to 8. Victoria was the first (and only to date) non-NHL team to win the Stanley Cup since the NHL's founding.

March 21	Montreal Canadiens	2–5	Victoria Cougars	Patrick Arena (game two played in Denman Arena)	Recap
No scoring		First period	3:50 - Jack Walker (1); 11:55 - Haldor Halderson (1)
No scoring		Second period	3:22 - Jack Walker (2)
Billy Coutu (1) - 13:38; Howie Morenz (4) - 19:06		Third period	3:22 - Gord Fraser (1); 14:06 - Gord Fraser (2)
Georges Vezina		Goalie stats	Hap Holmes

March 23	Montreal Canadiens	1–3	Victoria Cougars	Patrick Arena (game two played in Denman Arena)	Recap
No scoring		First period	8:15 - Jack Walker (3); 15:40 - Frank Fredrickson (1)
Aurele Joliat (1) - 1:18		Second period	No scoring
No scoring		Third period	8:52 - Jack Walker (4)
Georges Vezina		Goalie stats	Hap Holmes

March 27	Montreal Canadiens	4–2	Victoria Cougars	Patrick Arena (game two played in Denman Arena)	Recap
Howie Morenz (5) - 4:32		First period	9:00 - Jocko Anderson (1)
No scoring		Second period	No scoring
Aurele Joliat (2) - 5:50; Howie Morenz (6) - 7:30; Howie Morenz (7) - 18:52		Third period	1:49 - Gizzy Hart (1)
Georges Vezina		Goalie stats	Hap Holmes

March 30	Montreal Canadiens	1–6	Victoria Cougars	Patrick Arena (game two played in Denman Arena)	Recap
No scoring		First period	5:05 - Frank Fredrickson (2)
Billy Boucher (2) - 11:38		Second period	1:35 - Gizzy Hart (2); 16:25 - Haldor Halderson (2); 00:00 - Frank Foyston (1)
No scoring		Third period	7:05 - Frank Fredrickson (3); 16:31 - Clem Loughlin (1)
Georges Vezina		Goalie stats	Hap Holmes

Victoria won the series 3–1

=== NHL Playoff scoring leader ===
Note: GP = Games played; G = Goals; A = Assists; Pts = Points

Player	Team	GP	G	A	Pts
Howie Morenz	Montreal Canadiens	6	7	1	8

== Awards ==
The NHL introduced its second individual award, the Lady Byng Trophy, named after its donor, Lady Byng, wife of Canada's Governor-General. It is awarded to Frank Nighbor for excellence, gentlemanly play and sportsmanship.

1924–25 NHL awards
Hart Trophy: (Most valuable player)	Billy Burch, Hamilton Tigers
Lady Byng Trophy: (Excellence and sportsmanship)	Frank Nighbor, Ottawa Senators
O'Brien Cup: (League champions)	Montreal Canadiens
Prince of Wales Trophy: (League champions)	Montreal Canadiens

Note: The Prince of Wales Trophy was not in use during this season. The Canadiens were engraved onto the Trophy in 1925–26.

== Player statistics ==
=== Scoring leaders ===
Note: GP = Games played; G = Goals; A = Assists; Pts = Points

Player	Team	GP	G	A	Pts
Babe Dye	Toronto St. Patricks	29	38	6	44
Cy Denneny	Ottawa Senators	28	27	15	42
Aurele Joliat	Montreal Canadiens	24	29	11	40
Howie Morenz	Montreal Canadiens	30	27	7	34
Billy Boucher	Montreal Canadiens	30	18	13	31
Jack Adams	Toronto St. Patricks	27	21	8	29
Billy Burch	Hamilton Tigers	27	20	4	24
Red Green	Hamilton Tigers	30	19	4	23
Jimmy Herbert	Boston Bruins	30	17	5	22
Hap Day	Toronto St. Patricks	26	10	12	22

Source: NHL.

=== Leading goaltenders ===
GP = Games Played, GA = Goals Against, SO = Shutouts, GAA = Goals Against Average

Player	Team	GP	GA	SO	GAA
Georges Vezina	Montreal Canadiens	30	56	5	1.81
Jake Forbes	Hamilton Tigers	30	60	6	1.96
Clint Benedict	Montreal Maroons	30	65	2	2.12
Alec Connell	Ottawa Senators	30	66	7	2.14
John Ross Roach	Toronto St. Patricks	30	84	1	2.80
Charles Stewart	Boston Bruins	21	65	2	3.08
Howie Lockhart	Boston Bruins	2	11	0	5.50
Hec Fowler	Boston Bruins	7	43	0	6.16

== Coaches ==
- Boston Bruins: Art Ross
- Hamilton Tigers: Jimmy Gardner
- Montreal Canadiens: Leo Dandurand
- Montreal Maroons: Cecil Hart and Eddie Gerard
- Ottawa Senators: Pete Green
- Toronto St. Patricks: Eddie Powers

== Debuts ==
The following is a list of players of note who played their first NHL game in 1924–25 (listed with their first team, asterisk(*) marks debut in playoffs):

- Alex Connell, Ottawa Senators
- Carson Cooper, Boston Bruins
- Hap Day, Toronto St. Patricks
- Charles Dinsmore, Montreal Maroons
- Jimmy Herbert, Boston Bruins
- Bert McCaffrey, Toronto St. Patricks
- Alex Smith, Ottawa Senators
- Hooley Smith, Ottawa Senators

== Last games ==
The following is a list of players of note that played their last game in the NHL in 1924–25 (listed with their last team):

== Free agency ==
Date	Players	Team
October 31, 1924	Hooley Smith	Ottawa Senators
November 18, 1924	Alex Connell	Ottawa Senators
December 9, 1924	Hap Day	Toronto St. Patricks

== Transactions ==
October 20, 1924	To Montreal Maroons Clint Benedict; Punch Broadbent	To Ottawa Senators cash
December 8, 1924	To Boston Bruins Ernie Parkes	To Toronto St. Patricks cash
December 9, 1924	To Montreal Maroons Reg Noble	To Toronto St. Patricks $8,000 cash
December 14, 1924	To Boston Bruins Billy Stuart	To Toronto St. Patricks cash
December 19, 1924	To Boston Bruins George Carroll	To Montreal Maroons rights to Ernie Parkes
December 24, 1924	To Hamilton Tigers rights to Charlie Cotch	To Montreal Canadiens cash
January 3, 1924	To Boston Bruins Robert Benson; Bernie Morris	To Montreal Maroons Alf Skinner
January 10, 1925	To Boston Bruins Lionel Hitchman	To Ottawa Senators cash

== See also ==
- List of Stanley Cup champions
- 1924–25 WCHL season
