= List of Hamilton Tigers players =

Hamilton Tigers logo, 1923-25

This is a list of players who have played at least one game for the Quebec Bulldogs (1919–1920) and Hamilton Tigers (1920-1925) of the National Hockey League (NHL). This list does not include Quebec Bulldogs players who played for the team prior to the team joining the NHL. This list also does not include players for the New York Americans (1925–26 to 1940–41) and Brooklyn Americans (1941–42).

== Key ==
- Hockey Hall of Famer

Abbreviations
C	Center
D	Defenseman
L	Left wing
R	Right wing

Goaltenders
W	Wins
L	Losses
T	Ties
SO	Shutouts
GAA	Goals against average
SV%	Save percentage

Skaters
GP	Games played
G	Goals
A	Assists
Pts	Points
PIM	Penalty minutes

The "Seasons" column lists the first year of the season of the player's first game and the last year of the season of the player's last game. For example, a player who played one game in the 2000–2001 season would be listed as playing with the team from 2000–2001, regardless of what calendar year the game occurred within.

== Skaters ==
				Regular season				
Player	Team	Pos	Years	GP	G	A	Pts	PIM
Amos Arbour	HAM	L	1921–1923	46	15	9	24	20
Edmond Bouchard	HAM	L	1922–1925	66	12	14	26	56
Billy Burch (1974)	HAM	C	1922–1925	61	42	16	58	20
George Carey	BOTH	R	1919–1923	68	21	12	33	20
Ed Carpenter	BOTH	D	1919–1921	45	10	5	15	41
Bert Corbeau	HAM	D	1922–1923	21	10	4	14	22
Charlie Cotch	HAM	L	1924–1925	7	1	0	1	0
Jack Coughlin	BOTH	R	1919–1921	11	0	0	0	0
Billy Coutu	HAM	D	1920–1921	24	8	4	12	95
Corb Denneny	HAM	C	1923–1924	23	0	1	1	6
Babe Dye (1970)	HAM	R	1920–1921	1	2	0	2	0
Charles Fraser	HAM	D	1923–1924	1	0	0	0	0
Leth Graham	HAM	L	1922–1923	5	1	0	1	0
Red Green	HAM	L	1923–1925	53	30	17	47	112
Shorty Green (1963)	HAM	R	1923–1925	50	25	15	40	94
Charlie Langlois	HAM	R	1924–1925	30	6	3	9	47
Ed Lowrey	HAM	C	1920–1921	5	0	0	0	0
Joe Malone (1950)	BOTH	C	1919–1922	68	91	26	117	22
Jack Marks	QBD	L	1919–1920	1	0	0	0	4
Joe Matte	HAM	D	1920–1922	42	9	12	21	35
Thomas McCarthy	BOTH	R	1919–1921	35	22	7	29	10
Jack McDonald	QBD	L	1919–1920	24	6	7	13	4
Moylan McDonnell	HAM	D	1920–1921	22	1	2	3	2
Alex McKinnon	HAM	R	1924–1925	29	8	3	11	47
Fred McLean	BOTH	D	1919–1921	8	0	0	0	2
George McNaughton	QBD	R	1919–1920	1	0	0	0	0
Harry Mummery	BOTH	D	1919–1923	51	13	11	24	86
Charles Pletsch	HAM	D	1920–1921	1	0	0	0	0
Goldie Prodgers	HAM	C	1920–1925	95	55	23	78	35
Ken Randall	HAM	R	1923–1925	54	15	16	31	110
Leo Reise Sr.	HAM	D	1920–1924	76	24	34	58	61
Dave Ritchie	QBD	D	1919–1920	23	6	3	9	18
Mickey Roach	HAM	C	1920–1925	112	51	31	82	30
Ganton Scott	HAM	R	1923–1924	8	0	0	0	0
Tommy Smith (1973)	QBD	C	1919–1920	10	0	1	1	11
Jesse Spring	HAM	D	1923–1925	49	5	4	9	31
Alex Wellington	QBD	R	1919–1920	1	0	0	0	0
Cully Wilson	HAM	R	1921–1923	46	23	14	37	66

== Goaltenders ==
			Regular season						
Player	Team	Years	GP	W	L	T	SO	GAA	SV%
Frank Brophy	QBD	1919–1920	21	3	18	0	0	7.11	—
Jake Forbes	HAM	1922–1925	78	34	43	1	7	2.98	—
Howard Lockhart	BOTH	1919–1922	49	12	36	0	1	5.25	—

== See also ==
- List of NHL players
