= 1923–24 Toronto St. Patricks season =

NHL hockey team season

1923–24 Toronto St. Patricks
- League: 3rd NHL
- 1923–24 record: 10–14–0
- Home record: 7–5–0
- Road record: 3–9–0
- Goals for: 59
- Goals against: 85

Team information
- General manager: Charles Querrie
- Coach: Charles Querrie
- Captain: Jack Adams
- Arena: Arena Gardens

Team leaders
- Goals: Babe Dye (17)
- Assists: Bert Corbeau (8)
- Points: Babe Dye (21)
- Penalty minutes: Reg Noble (79)
- Wins: John Ross Roach (10)
- Goals against average: John Ross Roach (3.48)

The 1923–24 Toronto St. Patricks was Toronto's seventh in the National Hockey League (NHL). The St. Patricks finished third to miss the playoffs for the second year in a row, for the first time since the 1918–19 and 1919–20 seasons.

== Regular season ==
=== Final standings ===
National Hockey League
	GP	W	L	T	Pts	GF	GA
**Ottawa Senators**	24	16	8	0	32	74	54
**Montreal Canadiens**	24	13	11	0	26	59	48
Toronto St. Patricks	24	10	14	0	20	59	85
Hamilton Tigers	24	9	15	0	18	63	68

Note: W = Wins, L = Losses, T = Ties, GF = Goals For, GA = Goals Against, Pts = Points
Teams that qualified for the playoffs are highlighted in bold.

=== Record vs. opponents ===
1923–24 NHL records
Team	HAM	MTL	OTT	TOR
Hamilton	—	2–6	2–6	4–4
Montreal	6–2	—	3–5	4–4
Ottawa	6–2	5–3	—	6–2
Toronto	4–4	4–4	2–6	—

== Schedule and results ==
1923–24 regular season
December

Game	Result	Date	Score	Opponent	Record
1	W	December 15, 1923	2–1	Montreal Canadiens (1923–24)	1–0–0
2	L	December 19, 1923	2–5	@ Ottawa Senators (1923–24)	1–1–0
3	W	December 22, 1923	5–2	Hamilton Tigers (1923–24)	2–1–0
4	W	December 26, 1923	2–1	@ Hamilton Tigers (1923–24)	3–1–0
5	L	December 29, 1923	0–3	@ Montreal Canadiens (1923–24)	3–2–0

January

Game	Result	Date	Score	Opponent	Record
6	L	January 2, 1924	3–4	Ottawa Senators (1923–24)	3–3–0
7	L	January 5, 1924	3–7	@ Ottawa Senators (1923–24)	3–4–0
8	L	January 9, 1924	3–5	@ Hamilton Tigers (1923–24)	3–5–0
9	W	January 12, 1924	5–3	Montreal Canadiens (1923–24)	4–5–0
10	W	January 16, 1924	3–1	Hamilton Tigers (1923–24)	5–5–0
11	W	January 19, 1924	2–0	@ Montreal Canadiens (1923–24)	6–5–0
12	L	January 23, 1924	1–5	Ottawa Senators (1923–24)	6–6–0
13	W	January 26, 1924	2–1	Montreal Canadiens (1923–24)	7–6–0
14	L	January 30, 1924	2–7	@ Ottawa Senators (1923–24)	7–7–0

February

Game	Result	Date	Score	Opponent	Record
15	L	February 2, 1924	2–4	Hamilton Tigers (1923–24)	7–8–0
16	L	February 6, 1924	4–6	@ Hamilton Tigers (1923–24)	7–9–0
17	L	February 9, 1924	3–5	@ Montreal Canadiens (1923–24)	7–10–0
18	W	February 13, 1924	4–2	Ottawa Senators (1923–24)	8–10–0
19	W	February 16, 1924	2–1	@ Ottawa Senators (1923–24)	9–10–0
20	L	February 20, 1924	1–3	@ Hamilton Tigers (1923–24)	9–11–0
21	W	February 23, 1924	2–1	Hamilton Tigers (1923–24)	10–11–0
22	L	February 27, 1924	1–6	@ Montreal Canadiens (1923–24)	10–12–0

March

Game	Result	Date	Score	Opponent	Record
23	L	March 1, 1924	1–4	Montreal Canadiens (1923–24)	10–13–0
24	L	March 5, 1924	4–8	Ottawa Senators (1923–24)	10–14–0

**Legend**: Win (2 points) Loss (0 points) Tie (1 point)

== Player statistics ==
Regular season
**Scoring**

Player	Pos	GP	G	A	Pts	PIM
Babe Dye	RW	19	16	3	19	23
Jack Adams	C	22	14	4	18	51
Reg Noble	C/D	24	12	5	17	79
Bert Corbeau	D	24	8	6	14	55
Billy Stuart	D	24	4	3	7	22
Amos Arbour	LW	21	1	3	4	4
Lloyd Andrews	LW	12	2	1	3	0
Stan Jackson	LW	22	1	1	2	6
Albert Holway	D	5	1	0	1	0
George Carey	RW	4	0	0	0	0
Howard Lockhart	G	1	0	0	0	0
Wilf Loughlin	D/LW	14	0	0	0	2
John Ross Roach	G	23	0	0	0	0
Ganton Scott	RW	4	0	0	0	0
Chris Speyer	D	3	0	0	0	0

**Goaltending**

Player	MIN	GP	W	L	T	GA	GAA	SO
John Ross Roach	1380	23	10	13	0	80	3.48	1
Howard Lockhart	60	1	0	1	0	5	5.00	0
Team:	1440	24	10	14	0	85	3.54	1

Note:

Pos = Position;GP = Games played; G = Goals; A = Assists; Pts = Points; PIM = Penalty minutes; +/- = Plus/minus; PPG = Power-play goals; SHG = Short-handed goals; GWG = Game-winning goals
Pos = Position;GP = Games played; Min, TOI = Minutes played; W = Wins; L = Losses; T,T/OT = Ties; OTL = Overtime losses; GA = Goals-against; GAA = Goals-against average; SO = Shutouts; SA = Shots against; SV = Shots saved;SV% = Save percentage;

== Transactions ==
- September 6, 1923: Babe Dye announces retirement
- October 24, 1923: Acquire Wilf Loughlin from Victoria Cougars (PCHA) for cash
- December 14, 1923: Trade Ken Randall, rights to Corbett Denneny and cash to Hamilton Tigers for Amos Arbour, Bert Corbeau and George Carey
- January 2, 1924: Signed Free Agent Babe Dye
- January 16, 1924: Traded Ganton Scott to Hamilton Tigers for cash
- February 15, 1924: Signed Free Agent Toots Holway
- February 23, 1924: Signed Free Agent Chris Speyer

== See also ==
- 1923–24 NHL season
