= 1923–24 Hamilton Tigers season =

National Hockey League team season

1923–24 Hamilton Tigers
- League: 4th NHL
- 1923–24 record: 9–15–0
- Home record: 7–5–0
- Road record: 2–10–0
- Goals for: 63
- Goals against: 68

Team information
- General manager: Percy Thompson
- Coach: Percy LeSueur, Ken Randall
- Arena: Barton Street Arena

Team leaders
- Goals: Billy Burch (16)
- Assists: Shorty Green (7)
- Points: Billy Burch (22)
- Penalty minutes: Ken Randall (64)
- Wins: Jake Forbes (9)
- Goals against average: Jake Forbes (2.75)

The 1923–24 Hamilton Tigers season was the fourth season of the NHL franchise in Hamilton. For the fourth consecutive season, the Tigers finished last in the NHL.

== Regular season ==
=== Final standings ===
National Hockey League
	GP	W	L	T	Pts	GF	GA
**Ottawa Senators**	24	16	8	0	32	74	54
**Montreal Canadiens**	24	13	11	0	26	59	48
Toronto St. Patricks	24	10	14	0	20	59	85
Hamilton Tigers	24	9	15	0	18	63	68

Note: W = Wins, L = Losses, T = Ties, GF = Goals For, GA = Goals Against, Pts = Points
Teams that qualified for the playoffs are highlighted in bold.

=== Record vs. opponents ===
1923–24 NHL records
Team	HAM	MTL	OTT	TOR
Hamilton	—	2–6	2–6	4–4
Montreal	6–2	—	3–5	4–4
Ottawa	6–2	5–3	—	6–2
Toronto	4–4	4–4	2–6	—

== Schedule and results ==
1923–24 regular season
December

Game	Result	Date	Score	Opponent	Record
1	L	December 15, 1923	2–3	Ottawa Senators (1923–24)	0–1–0
2	L	December 19, 1923	1–3	Montreal Canadiens (1923–24)	0–2–0
3	L	December 22, 1923	2–5	@ Toronto St. Patricks (1923–24)	0–3–0
4	L	December 26, 1923	1–2	Toronto St. Patricks (1923–24)	0–4–0
5	W	December 29, 1923	3–2	@ Ottawa Senators (1923–24)	1–4–0

January

Game	Result	Date	Score	Opponent	Record
6	W	January 2, 1924	4–0	Montreal Canadiens (1923–24)	2–4–0
7	L	January 5, 1924	1–5	@ Montreal Canadiens (1923–24)	2–5–0
8	W	January 9, 1924	5–3	Toronto St. Patricks (1923–24)	3–5–0
9	L	January 12, 1924	2–3	Ottawa Senators (1923–24)	3–6–0
10	L	January 16, 1924	1–3	@ Toronto St. Patricks (1923–24)	3–7–0
11	L	January 19, 1924	1–2	@ Ottawa Senators (1923–24)	3–8–0
12	W	January 23, 1924	4–1	Montreal Canadiens (1923–24)	4–8–0
13	W	January 26, 1924	5–1	Ottawa Senators (1923–24)	5–8–0
14	L	January 30, 1924	2–5	@ Montreal Canadiens (1923–24)	5–9–0

February

Game	Result	Date	Score	Opponent	Record
15	W	February 2, 1924	4–2	@ Toronto St. Patricks (1923–24)	6–9–0
16	W	February 6, 1924	6–4	Toronto St. Patricks (1923–24)	7–9–0
17	L	February 9, 1924	0–1	@ Ottawa Senators (1923–24)	7–10–0
18	L	February 13, 1924	2–3	Montreal Canadiens (1923–24)	7–11–0
19	L	February 16, 1924	1–2	@ Montreal Canadiens (1923–24)	7–12–0
20	W	February 20, 1924	3–1	Toronto St. Patricks (1923–24)	8–12–0
21	L	February 23, 1924	1–2	@ Toronto St. Patricks (1923–24)	8–13–0
22	L	February 27, 1924	4–7	@ Ottawa Senators (1923–24)	8–14–0

March

Game	Result	Date	Score	Opponent	Record
23	W	March 1, 1924	5–2	Ottawa Senators (1923–24)	9–14–0
24	L	March 5, 1924	3–6	@ Montreal Canadiens (1923–24)	9–15–0

**Legend**: Win (2 points) Loss (0 points) Tie (1 point)

== Player statistics ==
Regular season
**Scoring**

Player	Pos	GP	G	A	Pts	PIM
Billy Burch	C/LW	24	16	6	22	6
Red Green	LW	23	11	2	13	31
Goldie Prodgers	F/D	23	9	4	13	6
Shorty Green	RW	22	7	6	13	31
Ken Randall	RW/D	24	7	6	13	58
Mickey Roach	C	20	5	3	8	7
Jesse Spring	D	20	3	3	6	20
Edmond Bouchard	LW/D	20	5	0	5	2
Corb Denneny	C	23	0	1	1	6
Jake Forbes	G	24	0	0	0	0
Charles Fraser	D	1	0	0	0	0
Leo Reise	D	4	0	0	0	4
Ganton Scott	RW	8	0	0	0	0

**Goaltending**

Player	MIN	GP	W	L	T	GA	GAA	SO
Jake Forbes	1483	24	9	15	0	68	2.75	1
Team:	1483	24	9	15	0	68	2.75	1

Note: Pos = Position; GP = Games played; G = Goals; A = Assists; Pts = Points; PIM = Penalty minutes
MIN = Minutes played; W = Wins; L = Losses; T = Ties; GA = Goals-against; GAA = Goals-against average; SO = Shutouts;

== See also ==
- 1923–24 NHL season
