= 1923–24 Ottawa Senators season =

Professional ice hockey team season

1923–24 Ottawa Senators
- League: 1st NHL
- 1923–24 record: 16–8–0
- Home record: 10–2–0
- Road record: 6–6–0
- Goals for: 74
- Goals against: 54

Team information
- General manager: Tommy Gorman
- Coach: Pete Green
- Captain: Cy Denneny
- Arena: Ottawa Auditorium

Team leaders
- Goals: Cy Denneny (22)
- Assists: King Clancy (8)
- Points: Cy Denneny (23)
- Penalty minutes: Punch Broadbent (44)
- Wins: Clint Benedict (15)
- Goals against average: Clint Benedict (1.99)

The 1923–24 Ottawa Senators season was the club's 39th season of play and seventh season in the NHL. Coming off a Stanley Cup Championship in 1923, they had won three cups in the previous four seasons. The Senators moved into the brand new Ottawa Auditorium prior to the season. The club had an outstanding regular season, but lost in the NHL playoffs to the Montreal Canadiens.

== Team business ==
The five-year partnership of the Ottawa Arena Club expired in 1923. The team's ownership was unified with the parent Ottawa Hockey Association which was to be owned by Frank Ahearn and Tommy Gorman. Ted Dey gave up his half-interest in the Senators first for an investment in the Association and the Auditorium, then sold his share to Ahearn and Gorman.

== Regular season ==
Cy Denneny led the NHL in scoring with 22 goals and 23 points, while Frank Nighbor became the first player to win the Hart Trophy, awarded to the MVP of the league. The Sens defense was led by Buck Boucher and King Clancy, who both finished among the league leaders in points.

Clint Benedict had another very solid season, as his 15 wins and 3 shutouts led the NHL, and he had a personal best GAA of 1.99.

In a game in late February, the Senators were late for a game against the Montreal Canadiens in Montreal due to their train being snowbound in Hawkesbury, Ontario for the night. While out to try to get some food for his teammates Cy Denneny fell down a well, but sustained no injuries from the fall.

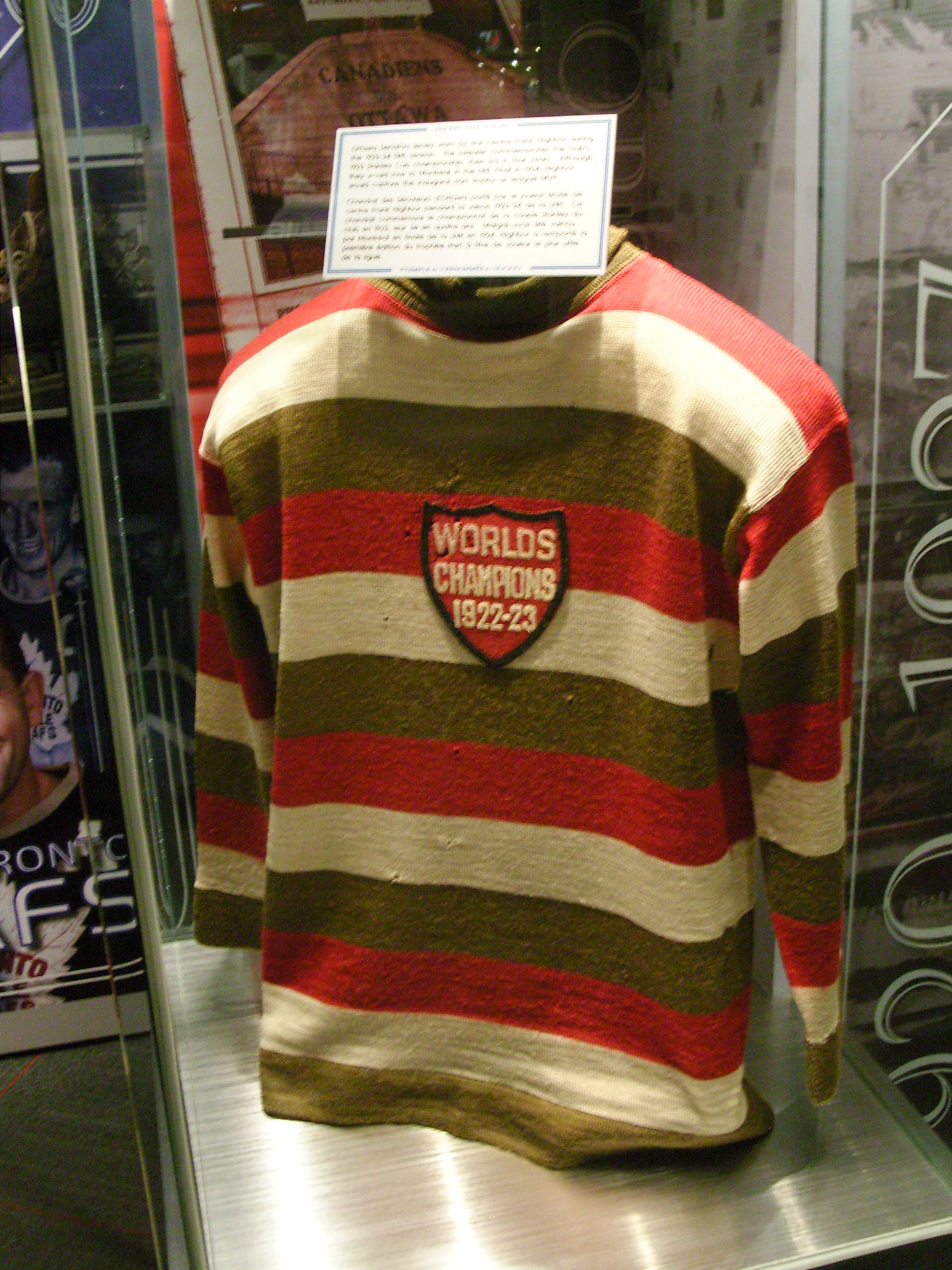
The Senators changed their jersey colours from black, red and white to gold, red and white, with a championship patch. Display at the Hockey Hall of Fame.

=== December ===
- **December 15** – The defending Stanley Cup champions travelled to Barton Street Arena in Hamilton to open the 1923–24 against the Hamilton Tigers. Frank Nighbor scored twice and added an assist, as Ottawa defeated the Tigers 3–2.
- **December 19** – Ottawa faced off against the Toronto St. Patricks in their home opener. Georges Boucher scored two goals and an assist, and Cy Denneny scored twice, as the Senators defeated the St. Patricks 5–2.
- **December 26** – The Montreal Canadiens made their first visit to Ottawa on Boxing Day. With the Canadiens leading the game 2–1 in the third period, Cy Denneny evened up the score midway through the period. In overtime, Denneny scored the game winning goal, as Ottawa remained perfect with a 3–0–0 record with a 3–2 victory.
- **December 29** – The Senators would conclude their three game homestand with a matchup against the winless Hamilton Tigers. The Tigers surprised the Senators, as Shorty Green scored the overtime winning goal for Hamilton, to defeat the Senators 3–2. Cy Denneny had a goal and an assist in the loss. This marked the Senators first loss on home ice in the regular season since March 8, 1922, ending an unbeaten streak of 14 games (13–0–1).

The Senators finished December with a 3–1–0 record in four games. The Senators and Toronto St. Patricks were tied for first with six points, however, the Senators had played one fewer game than Toronto.

=== January ===
- **January 2** – The Senators opened the New Year with their first trip to Mutual Street Arena of the season for a game against the Toronto St. Patricks. Ottawa was led by Cy Denneny, who scored two goals, as they held off the St. Patricks for a 4–3 victory.
- **January 5** – The Senators and Toronto St. Patricks would meet for the second straight game, this time in Ottawa. The Senators stormed out to a 6–0 lead halfway through the game and easily defeated the St. Patricks 7–3. Georges Boucher and Cy Denneny each scored twice in the winning effort.
- **January 9** – The Montreal Canadiens made the trip to Ottawa for a home game for the Senators. Third period goals by Frank Nighbor and Punch Broadbent, who scored with 50 seconds left in the game, helped the Senators win the game 2–1. The win extended the Senators winning streak to three games and a 6–1–0 overall record on the season.
- **January 12** – The Senators travelled to Hamilton for a game against the Hamilton Tigers. The Tigers had a 2–0 lead with four minutes remaining in the game, however, Frank Nighbor and Georges Boucher scored for Ottawa, sending the game into overtime. The Senators completed the comeback, as Punch Broadbent scored the overtime winning goal for a 3–2 win, as Ottawa extended their winning streak to four games.
- **January 16** – Ottawa continued their road trip with a game against the Montreal Canadiens. Georges Boucher scored the lone goal for the Senators, as former Ottawa player, Sprague Cleghorn, scored the overtime winning goal for the Canadiens, as the Senators lost 2–1.
- **January 19** – Ottawa returned to home ice with a game against the Hamilton Tigers. Punch Broadbent scored a goal, while Cy Denneny scored the overtime winning goal, as the Senators defeated the Tigers 2–1.
- **January 21** – The Senators were back in Montreal for their second road game in five days against the Montreal Canadiens. The Senators took an early 2–0 lead on goals by King Clancy and Georges Boucher, however, the Canadiens tied the game with two goals by Howie Morenz. In overtime, Clancy notched his second goal of the game, giving the Senators a 3–2 victory.
- **January 23** – Ottawa continued on the road with a trip to Toronto to face the Toronto St. Patricks. The Senators remained hot, as Georges Boucher and Frank Nighbor each scored twice in a 5–1 win over the St. Patricks. The win extended the Senators win streak to three games and improved their overall record to 10–2–0 on the season.
- **January 26** – The Senators completed their three game road trip with a game against the Hamilton Tigers. The Tigers took control of the game early on and easily defeated Ottawa 5–1. Earl Campbell scored the only goal for the Senators, which was his first career NHL goal. The loss snapped the Senators winning streak at three games.
- **January 30** – Ottawa returned home for a game against the Toronto St. Patricks. Toronto took a 2–0 lead after the first period, however, the Senators stormed back with seven unanswered goals for a 7–2 victory. Cy Denneny scored three goals while Lionel Hitchman recorded five assists in the win.

Ottawa finished January with a record of 8–2–0 during the month. Overall, the Senators record at the end of January was 11–3–0, earning 22 points, as the Senators were in first place in the NHL, eight points ahead of the second place Toronto St. Patricks.

=== February/March ===
- **February 2** – The Senators opened February with a road game against the Montreal Canadiens. Billy Boucher of the Canadiens scored the lone goal of the game, as Georges Vezina stopped everything he saw as the Senators were shutout for the first time of the season, losing 1–0.
- **February 6** – Ottawa faced the Montreal Canadiens for the second consecutive game, this time on home ice. Cy Denneny scored twice and Clint Benedict earned his first shutout of the season, as Ottawa defeated Montreal 4–0.
- **February 9** – The Senators faced off against the Hamilton Tigers at home. Clint Benedict was the star of the game, stopping every shot he saw to earn his second straight shutout. Frank Nighbor scored the lone goal of the game, as Ottawa won 1–0. The win improved the Senators record to 13–4–0.
- **February 13** – The Senators were on the road for a matchup against the Toronto St. Patricks. Ottawa took a 2–0 lead after the first period, however, Toronto came back with four straight goals, as the Senators lost the game 4–2. Punch Broadbent and Cy Denneny were the goal scorers for Ottawa.
- **February 16** – Ottawa hosted the Toronto St. Patricks for the second game of a home-and-home series. Cy Denneny was the only Senators player to score a goal, as Ottawa dropped their second straight game, losing 2–1. Babe Dye scored the game winning goal with 45 seconds left in the third period.
- **February 21** – The Senators were on the road for a game against the Montreal Canadiens. Ottawa's offensive struggles continued, as they were shutout by the Canadiens 3–0. Georges Vezina earned the shutout for Montreal, his second shutout of the month against Ottawa. The Senators losing streak was extended to three games.
- **February 23** – The Senators hosted the Montreal Canadiens for the second game of a home-and-home series. Ottawa continued to struggle offensively, as Punch Broadbent scored the lone goal. Clint Benedict stopped every shot he faced, as Ottawa snapped their losing skid with a 1–0 victory.
- **February 27** – Ottawa hosted the Hamilton Tigers for their final home game of the regular season. The Senators offense exploded for seven goals, as King Clancy scored three goals and added an assist to lead the way, as Ottawa defeated the Tigers 7–4. With the win, the Senators clinched first place in the NHL standings and a berth in the O'Brien Cup finals.
- **March 1** – Ottawa travelled for a road game against the Hamilton Tigers for the second game of a home-and-home series. With first place wrapped up, Ottawa rested some of their top players. The Tigers took advantage and defeated the Senators 5–2. Georges Boucher scored both goals for Ottawa.
- **March 5** – Ottawa concluded the regular season with a road game against the Toronto St. Patricks. Cy Denneny led the Senators with four goals, while Earl Campbell scored two goals and added two assists in a 8–4 win. Goaltender Sammy Hebert earned the victory for his first and only win as an Ottawa Senators player.

Ottawa finished the season with a 5–5–0 record during February and March. The Senators finished the season in first place in the NHL with a 16–8–0 record, six points ahead of the second place Montreal Canadiens.

=== Final standings ===
National Hockey League
	GP	W	L	T	Pts	GF	GA
**Ottawa Senators**	24	16	8	0	32	74	54
**Montreal Canadiens**	24	13	11	0	26	59	48
Toronto St. Patricks	24	10	14	0	20	59	85
Hamilton Tigers	24	9	15	0	18	63	68

Note: W = Wins, L = Losses, T = Ties, GF = Goals For, GA = Goals Against, Pts = Points
Teams that qualified for the playoffs are highlighted in bold.

=== Record vs. opponents ===
1923–24 NHL records
Team	HAM	MTL	OTT	TOR
Hamilton	—	2–6	2–6	4–4
Montreal	6–2	—	3–5	4–4
Ottawa	6–2	5–3	—	6–2
Toronto	4–4	4–4	2–6	—

== Schedule and results ==
1923–24 regular season
December: 3–1–0 (home: 2–1–0; road: 1–0–0)

Game	Date	Visitor	Score	Home	OT	Decision	Attendance	Arena	Record	Pts
1	December 15	Ottawa	3–2	Hamilton		Benedict	N/A	Barton Street Arena	1–0–0	2
2	December 19	Toronto	2–5	Ottawa		Benedict	N/A	Ottawa Auditorium	2–0–0	4
3	December 26	Montreal	2–3	Ottawa	OT	Benedict	N/A	Ottawa Auditorium	3–0–0	6
4	December 29	Hamilton	3–2	Ottawa	OT	Benedict	N/A	Ottawa Auditorium	3–1–0	6

January: 8–2–0 (home: 4–0–0; road: 4–2–0)

Game	Date	Visitor	Score	Home	OT	Decision	Attendance	Arena	Record	Pts
5	January 2	Ottawa	4–3	Toronto		Benedict	N/A	Arena Gardens	4–1–0	8
6	January 5	Toronto	3–7	Ottawa		Benedict	N/A	Ottawa Auditorium	5–1–0	10
7	January 9	Montreal	1–2	Ottawa		Benedict	N/A	Ottawa Auditorium	6–1–0	12
8	January 12	Ottawa	3–2	Hamilton	OT	Benedict	N/A	Barton Street Arena	7–1–0	14
9	January 16	Ottawa	1–2	Montreal	OT	Benedict	N/A	Mount Royal Arena	7–2–0	14
10	January 19	Hamilton	1–2	Ottawa	OT	Benedict	N/A	Ottawa Auditorium	8–2–0	16
11	January 21	Ottawa	3–2	Montreal		Benedict	N/A	Mount Royal Arena	9–2–0	18
12	January 23	Ottawa	5–1	Toronto		Benedict	N/A	Arena Gardens	10–2–0	20
13	January 26	Ottawa	1–5	Hamilton		Benedict	N/A	Barton Street Arena	10–3–0	20
14	January 30	Toronto	2–7	Ottawa		Benedict	N/A	Ottawa Auditorium	11–3–0	22

February: 4–4–0 (home: 4–1–0; road: 0–3–0)

Game	Date	Visitor	Score	Home	OT	Decision	Attendance	Arena	Record	Pts
15	February 2	Ottawa	0–1	Montreal		Benedict	N/A	Mount Royal Arena	11–4–0	22
16	February 6	Montreal	0–4	Ottawa		Benedict	N/A	Ottawa Auditorium	12–4–0	24
17	February 9	Hamilton	0–1	Ottawa		Benedict	N/A	Ottawa Auditorium	13–4–0	26
18	February 13	Ottawa	2–4	Toronto		Benedict	N/A	Arena Gardens	13–5–0	26
19	February 16	Toronto	2–1	Ottawa		Benedict	N/A	Ottawa Auditorium	13–6–0	26
20	February 21	Ottawa	0–3	Montreal		Benedict	N/A	Mount Royal Arena	13–7–0	26
21	February 23	Montreal	0–1	Ottawa		Benedict	N/A	Ottawa Auditorium	14–7–0	28
22	February 27	Hamilton	4–7	Ottawa		Benedict	N/A	Ottawa Auditorium	15–7–0	30

March: 0–2–0 (home: 0–0–0; road: 0–2–0)

Game	Date	Visitor	Score	Home	OT	Decision	Attendance	Arena	Record	Pts
23	March 1	Ottawa	2–5	Hamilton		Hebert	N/A	Barton Street Arena	15–8–0	30
24	March 5	Ottawa	8–4	Toronto		Hebert	N/A	Arena Gardens	16–8–0	32

Legend: Win (2 points) Loss (0 points) Tie (1 point)

== Playoffs ==
=== Montreal Canadiens 5, Ottawa Senators 2 ===
The Senators again qualified for the playoffs and faced the Canadiens for the brand new Prince of Wales Trophy. Ottawa was defending champion and had the top record for the regular season. In an upset Montreal defeated Ottawa 5–2 in a two-game total goal series. Benedict's play came under criticism, with the Senators management publicly stating he was under the weather, and privately were withholding pay from Benedict on account of drinking affecting his play. The dispute ended up in court and Benedict would be traded to the Montreal Maroons before the next season. Broadbent was moved to the Maroons also.

On March 25, the Canadiens and Calgary Tigers Stanley Cup Finals game was played at the Ottawa Auditorium, due to the Mount Royal Arena in Montreal not having artificial ice. Montreal won the game and the 1924 Stanley Cup.

1924 Stanley Cup playoffs
NHL championship vs. (2) Montreal Canadiens – Canadiens win 5 goals to 2 goals

Game	Date	Visitor	Score	Home	OT	Decision	Attendance	Arena	Series
1	March 8	Ottawa	0–1	Montreal		Benedict	N/A	Mount Royal Arena	0–1
2	March 11	Montreal	4–2	Ottawa		Benedict	N/A	Ottawa Auditorium	2–5

Legend: Win Loss Tie

== Player statistics ==
=== Regular season ===
Scoring

Player	Pos	GP	G	A	Pts	PIM
Cy Denneny	LW	22	22	2	24	10
Georges Boucher	D	21	13	10	23	38
Frank Nighbor	C	20	11	6	17	16
King Clancy	D	24	8	8	16	26
Punch Broadbent	RW	22	9	4	13	44
Earl Campbell	D	18	5	3	8	8
Lionel Hitchman	D	24	2	6	8	24
Jack Darragh	RW	18	2	0	2	2
Rod Smylie	W	13	1	1	2	8
Harry Helman	RW	19	1	0	1	2
Clint Benedict	G	22	0	0	0	0
Frank Finnigan	RW	2	0	0	0	0
Leth Graham	LW	3	0	0	0	0
Sammy Hebert	G	2	0	0	0	0

Goaltending

Player	MIN	GP	W	L	T	GA	GAA	SO
Clint Benedict	1356	22	15	7	0	45	1.99	3
Sammy Hebert	120	2	1	1	0	9	4.50	0
Team:	1476	24	16	8	0	54	2.20	3

=== Playoffs ===
Scoring

Player	Pos	GP	G	A	Pts	PIM
Cy Denneny	LW	2	2	0	2	2
Georges Boucher	D	2	0	1	1	4
Frank Nighbor	C	2	0	1	1	0
Clint Benedict	G	2	0	0	0	0
Punch Broadbent	RW	2	0	0	0	2
Earl Campbell	D	1	0	0	0	6
King Clancy	D	2	0	0	0	6
Jack Darragh	RW	2	0	0	0	2
Frank Finnigan	RW	2	0	0	0	2
Lionel Hitchman	D	2	0	0	0	4

Goaltending

Player	MIN	GP	W	L	GA	GAA	SO
Clint Benedict	120	2	0	2	5	2.50	0
Team:	120	2	0	2	5	2.50	0

Note:

Pos = Position;GP = Games played; G = Goals; A = Assists; Pts = Points; PIM = Penalty minutes; +/- = Plus/minus; PPG = Power-play goals; SHG = Short-handed goals; GWG = Game-winning goals
Pos = Position;GP = Games played; Min, TOI = Minutes played; W = Wins; L = Losses; T,T/OT = Ties; OTL = Overtime losses; GA = Goals-against; GAA = Goals-against average; SO = Shutouts; SA = Shots against; SV = Shots saved;SV% = Save percentage;

== Transactions ==
The Senators were involved in the following transactions during the 1923–24 season.

=== Trades ===
December 18, 1923	To Ottawa Senators Leth Graham	To Hamilton Tigers Cash

=== Free agents signed ===
January 2, 1924	From Toronto St. Patricks Rod Smylie
February 21, 1924	From Ottawa Montagnards (OCHL) Frank Finnigan

== See also ==
- 1923–24 NHL season
