= 1923–24 Montreal Canadiens season =

NHL hockey team season

1923–24 Montreal Canadiens
- Stanley Cup champions
- League: 2nd NHL
- 1923–24 record: 13–11–0
- Home record: 10–2–0
- Road record: 3–9–0
- Goals for: 59
- Goals against: 48

Team information
- General manager: Leo Dandurand
- Coach: Leo Dandurand
- Captain: Sprague Cleghorn
- Arena: Mount Royal Arena

Team leaders
- Goals: Billy Boucher (16)
- Assists: Billy Boucher (7)
- Points: Billy Boucher (23)
- Penalty minutes: Billy Boucher (48)
- Wins: Georges Vezina (13)
- Goals against average: Georges Vezina (1.97)

The 1923–24 Montreal Canadiens season was the team's 15th season and seventh as a member of the National Hockey League (NHL). The Canadiens once again returned to the playoffs and won their second Stanley Cup, defeating the Calgary Tigers.

== Regular season ==
This season was the rookie season of new star Howie Morenz. Placed on a line with Bill Boucher and Aurel Joliat, the Canadiens had an offensive line to terrorize the league. All three player were top 10 scorers, Boucher with 16, Joliat with 15 and Morenz with 13. The threesome scored 44 of Montreal's total of 59 goals in 24 games.

December was mild in Montreal and the situation forced the postponement of several games at the Mount Royal Arena. The Canadiens played their first three games on the road before opening at home on December 29, defeating Toronto 3–0.

The NHL held a mid-season meeting on January 26 to consider suspending Sprague Cleghorn. Ottawa claimed he was deliberately injuring opponents, citing a spearing incident against Cy Denneny. The league rejected the charges, and in a game against Ottawa shortly thereafter, Cleghorn charged Lionel Hitchman into the boards and earned a one-game suspension.

After the mild month of December, the winter was snowy. On February 20, the train from Ottawa carrying the Senators was snow-bound partway to Montreal. The Senators' Cy Denneny while out looking for food, fell down a well, but escaped without injury. The game took place the next day.

It was a defensive era in the NHL. The Canadiens scored only 59 goals in 24 games, giving up 48. Georges Vezina led the league in goals against average of 2.0 per game. All four team's starting goalies had GAA under 4. Bill Boucher led the Canadiens in offence, scoring 16 goals.

=== Final standings ===
National Hockey League
| | GP | W | L | T | Pts | GF | GA |
|---|---|---|---|---|---|---|---|
| **Ottawa Senators** | 24 | 16 | 8 | 0 | 32 | 74 | 54 |
| **Montreal Canadiens** | 24 | 13 | 11 | 0 | 26 | 59 | 48 |
| Toronto St. Patricks | 24 | 10 | 14 | 0 | 20 | 59 | 85 |
| Hamilton Tigers | 24 | 9 | 15 | 0 | 18 | 63 | 68 |

Note: W = Wins, L = Losses, T = Ties, GF = Goals For, GA = Goals Against, Pts = Points
Teams that qualified for the playoffs are highlighted in bold.

=== Record vs. opponents ===
1923–24 NHL records
| Team | HAM | MTL | OTT | TOR |
|---|---|---|---|---|
| Hamilton | — | 2–6 | 2–6 | 4–4 |
| Montreal | 6–2 | — | 3–5 | 4–4 |
| Ottawa | 6–2 | 5–3 | — | 6–2 |
| Toronto | 4–4 | 4–4 | 2–6 | — |

== Schedule and results ==
1923–24 regular season
December

| Game | Result | Date | Score | Opponent | Record |
|---|---|---|---|---|---|
| 1 | L | December 15, 1923 | 1–2 | @ Toronto St. Patricks (1923–24) | 0–1–0 |
| 2 | W | December 19, 1923 | 3–1 | @ Hamilton Tigers (1923–24) | 1–1–0 |
| 3 | L | December 26, 1923 | 2–3 | @ Ottawa Senators (1923–24) | 1–2–0 |
| 4 | W | December 29, 1923 | 3–0 | Toronto St. Patricks (1923–24) | 2–2–0 |

January

| Game | Result | Date | Score | Opponent | Record |
|---|---|---|---|---|---|
| 5 | L | January 2, 1924 | 0–4 | @ Hamilton Tigers (1923–24) | 2–3–0 |
| 6 | W | January 5, 1924 | 5–1 | Hamilton Tigers (1923–24) | 3–3–0 |
| 7 | L | January 9, 1924 | 1–2 | @ Ottawa Senators (1923–24) | 3–4–0 |
| 8 | L | January 12, 1924 | 3–5 | @ Toronto St. Patricks (1923–24) | 3–5–0 |
| 9 | W | January 16, 1924 | 2–1 | Ottawa Senators (1923–24) | 4–5–0 |
| 10 | L | January 19, 1924 | 0–2 | Toronto St. Patricks (1923–24) | 4–6–0 |
| 11 | L | January 21, 1924 | 2–3 | Ottawa Senators (1923–24) | 4–7–0 |
| 12 | L | January 23, 1924 | 1–4 | @ Hamilton Tigers (1923–24) | 4–8–0 |
| 13 | L | January 26, 1924 | 1–2 | @ Toronto St. Patricks (1923–24) | 4–9–0 |
| 14 | W | January 30, 1924 | 5–2 | Hamilton Tigers (1923–24) | 5–9–0 |

February

| Game | Result | Date | Score | Opponent | Record |
|---|---|---|---|---|---|
| 15 | W | February 2, 1924 | 1–0 | Ottawa Senators (1923–24) | 6–9–0 |
| 16 | L | February 6, 1924 | 0–4 | @ Ottawa Senators (1923–24) | 6–10–0 |
| 17 | W | February 9, 1924 | 5–3 | Toronto St. Patricks (1923–24) | 7–10–0 |
| 18 | W | February 13, 1924 | 3–2 | @ Hamilton Tigers (1923–24) | 8–10–0 |
| 19 | W | February 16, 1924 | 2–1 | Hamilton Tigers (1923–24) | 9–10–0 |
| 20 | W | February 21, 1924 | 3–0 | Ottawa Senators (1923–24) | 10–10–0 |
| 21 | L | February 23, 1924 | 0–1 | @ Ottawa Senators (1923–24) | 10–11–0 |
| 22 | W | February 27, 1924 | 6–1 | Toronto St. Patricks (1923–24) | 11–11–0 |

March

| Game | Result | Date | Score | Opponent | Record |
|---|---|---|---|---|---|
| 23 | W | March 1, 1924 | 4–1 | @ Toronto St. Patricks (1923–24) | 12–11–0 |
| 24 | W | March 5, 1924 | 6–3 | Hamilton Tigers (1923–24) | 13–11–0 |

Legend: Win (2 points) Loss (0 points) Tie (1 point)

== Playoffs ==
The Montreal Canadiens defeated the defending Stanley Cup champion Ottawa Senators 5–2 in a two-game total-goals series. Out west, the PCHA second place Vancouver Maroons defeated the first place team (Seattle Metropolitans) also. Meanwhile, in the Western Canada Hockey League, the Calgary Tigers won the regular season and the playoffs. The Canadiens owner, Leo Dandurand, wanted Calgary and Vancouver to face off against each other and then have the Canadiens play the winner for the Stanley Cup. Frank Patrick, the president of the PCHA, refused to go along with that idea.

=== NHL Championship ===
All dates 1924

Montreal Canadiens vs. Ottawa Senators

| Date | Team | Score | Team | Score | Notes |
|---|---|---|---|---|---|
| March 8 | Montreal Canadiens | 1 | Ottawa Senators | 0 | |
| March 11 | Montreal Canadiens | 4 | Ottawa Senators | 2 | |

Montreal wins two game total goal series 5 goals to 2 to win the Prince of Wales Trophy.

=== Stanley Cup playoffs ===
==== Semi-finals ====
Since Leo Dandurand's request to have Vancouver and Calgary face off first was denied, the first round match-up was the Montreal Canadiens and Vancouver Maroons. This didn't dissuade Montreal at all as the Canadiens swept the best of three series two games to none.

Vancouver Maroons vs. Montreal Canadiens

| Date | Away | Score | Home | Score | Notes |
|---|---|---|---|---|---|
| March 18 | Vancouver Maroons | 2 | Montreal Canadiens | 3 | |
| March 20 | Vancouver Maroons | 1 | Montreal Canadiens | 2 | |

Montreal wins best-of-three two games to none

==== Finals ====
After sweeping Vancouver, Montreal's next opponent was the Calgary Tigers. Montreal swept them too in a best of three series. Howie Morenz was the star, scoring a hat trick in the first game, then another goal in the next game, which was transferred to Ottawa because of the slushy ice at Mount Royal Arena. Morenz was levelled by Cully Wilson of Calgary and suffered a chipped collarbone, but it was all in vain as Montreal won. The Canadiens swept all three teams they faced during the playoffs en route to their first Stanley Cup since their 1916 Cup win as a member of the NHA.

Calgary Tigers vs. Montreal Canadiens

| Date | Away | Score | Home | Score | Notes |
|---|---|---|---|---|---|
| March 22 | Calgary Tigers | 1 | Montreal Canadiens | 6 | |
| March 25 | Calgary Tigers | 0 | Montreal Canadiens | 3 | in Ottawa |

Montreal wins best-of-three two games to none for the Stanley Cup

== Awards ==
- O'Brien Cup – NHL champion
- Stanley Cup – Stanley Cup playoff champion

- Mouton, Claude (1987). The Montreal Canadiens. Key Porter Books. p. 155.

== See also ==
- 1923–24 NHL season
