= 1919–20 NHL transactions =

The following is a list of all team-to-team transactions that have occurred in the National Hockey League during the 1919–20 NHL season. It lists what team each player has been traded to, signed by, or claimed by, and for which player(s), if applicable.

== Rights retained ==
Note: This is the list of players who were retained with the return of the Quebec Athletics for the 1919–20 NHL season.

Date	Previous team	Name
November 25, 1919	Montreal Wanderers	George Carey
November 25, 1919	Montreal Canadiens	Jack Marks
November 25, 1919	Montreal Canadiens	Jack McDonald
November 25, 1919	Montreal Canadiens	Joe Malone
November 25, 1919	Ottawa Senators	Tommy Smith
November 25, 1919	Ottawa Senators	Rusty Crawford
November 25, 1919	Toronto St. Patricks	Harry Mummery
November 25, 1919	Toronto St. Patricks	Dave Ritchie
November 26, 1919	Montreal Wanderers	Goldie Prodgers

== Free agency ==
Date	Player	Team
November 25, 1919	Frank Brophy	Quebec Athletics
November 27, 1919	Cully Wilson	Toronto St. Patricks
November 29, 1919	Horace Merrill	Ottawa Senators
December 7, 1919	Howard McNamara	Montreal Canadiens
December 8, 1919	Frank Heffernan	Toronto St. Patricks
December 9, 1919	Duke Keats	Toronto St. Patricks
December 11, 1919	Don Smith	Montreal Canadiens
December 15, 1919	Eddie Carpenter	Montreal Canadiens
December 15, 1919	Howard Lockhart	Toronto St. Patricks
December 15, 1919	Ivan Mitchell	Toronto St. Patricks
December 15, 1919	Babe Dye	Toronto St. Patricks
December 16, 1919	Mickey Roach	Toronto St. Patricks
December 19, 1919	Jack MacKell	Ottawa Senators
December 21, 1919	George McNaughton	Quebec Athletics
January 5, 1920	Billy Stuart	Toronto St. Patricks
January 9, 1920	Alex Wellington	Quebec Athletics
January 13, 1920	Jack Coughlin	Quebec Athletics
January 16, 1918	Joe Matte	Toronto St. Patricks
February 2, 1920	Tommy McCarthy	Quebec Athletics
February 16, 1920	Fred McLean	Quebec Athletics
February 18, 1920	Jack Coughlin	Montreal Canadiens
February 28, 1920	Jake Forbes	Toronto St. Patricks

== Trades ==
December 7, 1919	To Toronto St. Patricks cash	To Vancouver Millionaires (PCHA) Alf Skinner; Jack Adams
December 7, 1919	To Toronto St. Patricks cash	To Victoria Aristocrats (PCHA) Harry Meeking
December 21, 1919	To Quebec Athletics Eddie Carpenter	To Montreal Canadiens Goldie Prodgers
January 14, 1920	To Toronto St. Patricks Goldie Prodgers	To Montreal Canadiens Harry Cameron
