= Chris Speyer =

Chris Speyer may refer to:

- Chris Speyer (ice hockey) (1902–1966), Canadian hockey player
- Chris Speyer (politician) (born 1941), Canadian politician, Member of Parliament from 1979 to 1988
