= Red green =

Red green or Red Green may refer to:

== Politics ==
- Eco-socialism, an ideology merging aspects of Marxism, socialism, green politics, ecology and alter-globalization
- Islamo-leftism, a political alliance of leftist (red) and Islamist (green) political movements
- Red-green alliance, an alliance of "red" social democratic or democratic socialist parties with "green" environmentalist parties
- Red-Green Alliance (Denmark), a revolutionary socialist and environmentalist political party in Denmark
- Red-Green Coalition, a centre-left coalition of Norwegian left-wing and environmentalist parties
- Red-Greens (Sweden), a cooperation of red (leftist) and green (environmentalist) political parties in Sweden

== People ==
- Red Green (ice hockey) (1899–1966), Canadian professional ice hockey left winger
- Steve Smith (comedian) (born 1945), Canadian comedian who portrayed his Red Green alterego on The Red Green Show

== See also ==
- Red–green color blindness, the inability to perceive differences between some of the colors that others can distinguish
- The Red Green Show (1991–2006), a Canadian television comedy
- RG color space, a color space that uses only two colors, red and green
