= California Hockey League =

US ice hockey league (1925–1933)

The California Hockey League was a professional ice hockey league that existed from 1925 until 1933.

== Background ==
The popularity of ice hockey in southern California grew rapidly between World War I and the Great Depression, as the region experienced a massive influx of population from other parts of North America. Los Angeles became a popular destination for relocated Canadians and New Englanders, and nearby mountain resorts offered tourists a venue for games on natural ice. The first amateur hockey league in California was founded in 1917, at the Los Angeles Ice Palace.

In early 1925, New York sports promoter Tex Rickard sent a proxy to the west coast to explore the possibility of standing up a western wing of the NHL on the Pacific Coast. This, along with a general boom in hockey interest, encouraged rink construction in Los Angeles and San Francisco. The California Amateur Hockey Association was founded after the 1925 opening of the modern Los Angeles Palais de Glace.

== Seasons ==
Although CAHA was, at least nominally, an amateur league it began to attract some former-professional talent. Former pros Lloyd Cook and Fred "Smokey" Harris, who had played extensively in the PCHA and NHL, gave the rosters some credibility; Cook became involved in management of the Hollywood Club. Within months of the league's founding, promoters issued "championship" challenges to top amateur teams across North America (including the Pittsburgh Yellow Jackets, Vancouver Monarchs, and Port Arthur Bearcats ).

In early 1926, league administrators abruptly reorganized the amateur league into a professional Commercial Hockey League. The founding teams were the Richfield Oilers, Palais-de-Glace, and Culver City. Flush with cash from sponsors (including the namesake Richfield Oil Corporation), the teams quickly assembled rosters of experienced pro players from across North America. Most prominent among these players were former PCHA star Bernie Morris and NHL veteran Ganton Scott. A separate amateur league was spun off, providing a platform for club and university amateurs. In April, Rickard sent the New York Americans to test the market with a barnstorming tour. Moose Johnson, one of hockey's best-known defensemen during the 1910s and a future member of the Hockey Hall of Fame, joined the Palais-de-Glace team against the Americans to kick off to his pro hockey comeback at age 40. Johnson was injured during his first game. Two weeks later, the Palais hosted an all-star benefit game with proceeds to benefit Johnson's recovery.

The following season, 1926–27, was the first full-season campaign as a professional league. Culver City became known as the Maroons, and a team sponsored by the Los Angeles Globe Ice Cream Company joined the league. At mid-season, the league accepted a challenge series from the Detroit Millionaires of the Michigan-Ontario amateur league. After the series concluded, several members of the Millionaires chose to remain in California and shore up the struggling Maroons team; the resulting team would eventually become known as the Hollywood Millionaires. The league gradually become known as the California Professional Hockey League (CPHL).

In March 1927, the Illinois-based promoter C. C. Pyle (representing football legend Red Grange) purchased the Winter Garden. Pyle, who had failed in attempts to buy the Toronto Maple Leafs and New York Americans, had a vision of a future "East-West World Series" to be played against the NHL. He brought an influx of cash and an agreement to restructure the CPHL into a 4-team professional league comprising Los Angeles, Hollywood, San Francisco, and Oakland. Even though Pyle would be out of the league within by 1929, his 4-team concept set the agenda for the CPHL in the late 1920s.

One of Pyle's first moves to increase the CPHL's exposure was to schedule a post-season series against the barnstorming Chicago Black Hawks. To make the Hawks' opponents more competitive, the league-champion Globe Ice Cream team was split between the Oilers and Maroons. The Globes never re-assembled, and in 1927-28 the league played with only the three remaining franchises.

In 1928-29, the league adopted Pyle's vision and for the first time became an inter-city league. Lloyd Cook's Maroons were relocated to San Francisco where they were nicknamed the Seals, after the local minor-league baseball team. A second franchise, the Oakland Sheiks, was stacked with talented young players who had jumped en masse from western amateur leagues, particularly in Saskatoon. Their goaltender was the prominent Hec Fowler, formerly a star in the PCHA. The Sheiks consistently dominated the league for the rest of its existence.

1929 proved to be the highwater mark of the CPHL. While still clearly the lowest-level minor league in North America, it regularly graduated players into the higher levels and even produced an occasional NHL contract. Its location opened up a variety of opportunities for publicity: boxing champion Willie Ritchie played goal for San Francisco, singer/actor Al Jolson and director Guy Empey owned shares of San Francisco and Hollywood respectively, and Hollywood stars regularly made cameos at games. Attendance in the 2000-4000 range was comparable to most minor league hockey operations of the era, and all games were broadcast on radio (a luxury that even some NHL teams had not yet adopted).

However, the unexpected death of Tex Rickard and the economic crash of 1929 brought an end to the notion of major-league expansion to the west coast. Expansion to a 5-team league (two teams in SF and Oakland, one in LA) in 1931 proved to be an ill-fated venture, and by 1933 the league was reduced to only 3 teams.

When low attendance forced the Hollywood Millionaires to drop out mid-season in 1933, reducing the schedule from 18 to only 10 weeks, the CPHL was forced to re-organize. While the Millionaires and Sheiks continued professional play the following season in two separate intra-city pro leagues, the concept of professional inter-city hockey in California was not revisited until the early 1940s.

== Legacy ==
While the league proved only a short-lived venture, it laid the groundwork for the development of ice hockey in California. Rinks built to host professional hockey became a basis for amateur hockey, including the survival of university-based teams which still survive to this day. By the end of the Depression, pro hockey had returned to the region and persisted in various forms until NHL expansion in 1967. The NHL teams located in Southern California bore names (Kings and Seals) which were linked to prominent teams of the 1930s (the amateur LA Monarchs and San Francisco Seals).

The CPHL was more often viewed as destination for veteran players close to retirement, than as a developmental league. Still, it produced the occasional up-and-coming talent. Alumni who went on to play in the NHL included Art Giroux, Bud Cook, and Gene Carrigan.

Hockey Hall of Famers Jack Walker, Tommy Dunderdale, and Moose Johnson played their final seasons in the California league before retiring.

== Franchises ==
- Hollywood Millionaires

Debuted with the league in 1927. They became dormant in 1930. In 1931 they were revived and renamed the Hollywood Stars. In 1932 they returned to their original name of Hollywood Millionaires. They folded on January 28, 1933.

- Oakland Sheiks

Debuted in 1928. Folded with league in 1933.

- Oakland Checkers

A second Oakland team that debuted in 1930 and folded after one season in 1931.

- Los Angeles Richfields

Debuted with league in 1927. In 1930 they were renamed the Los Angeles Millionaires. In 1931 they were renamed the Los Angeles Angels. They folded in 1932.

- San Francisco Tigers

Debuted in 1928. Folded January 12, 1931.

- San Francisco Black Hawks

A second San Francisco team that debuted in 1930. Folded January 23, 1931.

- San Francisco Rangers

Debuted in 1931. Folded with league in 1933.

== Champions ==
- 1926 - Palais de Glace
- 1927 - Globe Ice Cream
- 1928 - Richfield Oilers
- 1929 - Oakland Sheiks
- 1930 - Oakland Sheiks
- 1931 - Oakland Sheiks
- 1932 - Hollywood Stars
- 1933 - Oakland Sheiks

== Career points leaders ==
Note: Complete statistics only exist for seasons from 1927-28 to 1931-32. Guy Poole led the league in scoring the following season with 31 goals and 61 points, reflecting an extremely high rate of scoring in the league's final season

Player	Goals	Assists	Points
Guy Poole	84	60	144
Ganton Scott	86	32	118
Fred "Smokey" Harris	42	48	90
Wilf Peltier	54	34	88
Berge Irving	58	27	85
Ed Vokes	58	23	81
Don Cummings	55	24	79
Louis Coupez	52	24	76
Dan Carrigan	29	43	72
George Bond	42	28	70
