= Charles Fraser (ice hockey) =

Canadian ice hockey player (1897–1970)

- Born: August 9, 1891 Stellarton, Nova Scotia, Canada
- Died: August 9, 1970 (aged 79) Montreal, Quebec, Canada
- Position: Defence
- Shot: Left
- Played for: Hamilton Tigers
- Playing career: 1919–1925

Charles Everett Fraser (August 9, 1891 – August 9, 1970, named Jack Fraser in one source) was a Canadian ice hockey defenceman who played in one National Hockey League game for the Hamilton Tigers during the 1923–24 NHL season. He played on December 22, 1923 against the Toronto St. Pats. The rest of his career was spent in amateur leagues in Nova Scotia, and he retired in 1925.

== Career statistics ==
=== Regular season and playoffs ===
			Regular season					Playoffs
Season	Team	League	GP	G	A	Pts	PIM	GP	G	A	Pts	PIM
1919–20	Stellarton Seniors	NSSHL	11	4	0	4	—	—	—	—	—	—
1920–21	Stellarton Seniors	NSSHL	3	0	0	0	6	2	0	0	0	3
1921–22	New Glasgow Black Foxes	NSSHL	—	—	—	—	—	—	—	—	—	—
1921–22	Stellarton Professionals	MIL	—	—	—	—	—	6	4	0	4	—
1922–23	Stellarton Professionals	MIL	5	0	0	0	6	—	—	—	—	—
1922–23	Amherst Ramblers	MIL	7	3	0	3	14	—	—	—	—	—
1923–24	Hamilton Tigers	NHL	1	0	0	0	0	—	—	—	—	—
1923–24	Amherst Ramblers	MIL	15	3	3	6	22	—	—	—	—	—
1924–25	Stellarton Pros	Exhib	2	4	0	4	2	1	0	0	0	5
NHL totals			1	0	0	0	0	—	—	—	—	—

== See also ==
- List of players who played only one game in the NHL
