= Ed Vokes =

Canadian ice hockey player

- Born: April 1, 1908; Quill Lake, Saskatchewan, Canada
- Died: June 29, 1967 (aged 59)
- Height: 5 ft 9 in (175 cm)
- Weight: 160 lb (73 kg; 11 st 6 lb)
- Position: Left Wing
- Shot: Left
- Played for: Chicago Black Hawks
- Playing career: 1928–1933

Edwin Hoskin "Eddie" Vokes (April 1, 1908 – June 29, 1967) was a Canadian ice hockey player who played five games in the National Hockey League with the Chicago Black Hawks during the 1930–31 season. The rest of his career, which lasted from 1928 to 1933, was mainly spent in the California Hockey League. He was born in Quill Lake, Saskatchewan.

== Career statistics ==
=== Regular season and playoffs ===
			Regular season					Playoffs
Season	Team	League	GP	G	A	Pts	PIM	GP	G	A	Pts	PIM
1928–29	Oakland Sheiks	CalHL	10	0	0	0	—	—	—	—	—	—
1929–30	Oakland Sheiks	CalHL	—	25	8	33	29	—	—	—	—	—
1930–31	Chicago Black Hawks	NHL	5	0	0	0	0	—	—	—	—	—
1930–31	London Tecumsehs	IHL	12	0	0	0	0	—	—	—	—	—
1930–31	Niagara Falls Cataracts	Can-Pro	2	0	0	0	4	—	—	—	—	—
1931–32	San Francisco Rangers	CalHL	—	29	9	38	—	—	—	—	—	—
1932–33	San Francisco Rangers	CalHL	—	—	—	—	—	—	—	—	—	—
NHL totals			5	0	0	0	0	—	—	—	—	—
