= Wilf Loughlin =

Canadian ice hockey player

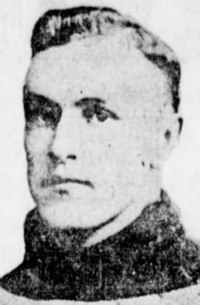
- Loughlin circa 1919
- Born: February 28, 1896 Carroll, Manitoba, Canada
- Died: June 25, 1966 (aged 70)
- Height: 6 ft 2 in (188 cm)
- Weight: 200 lb (91 kg; 14 st 4 lb)
- Position: Defence
- Shot: Left
- Played for: Edmonton Eskimos; Regina Capitals; Toronto St. Pats; Victoria Cougars; Victoria Aristocrats
- Playing career: 1915–1927

John Wilfred Loughlin (February 28, 1896 – June 25, 1966) was a Canadian ice hockey player who played one season in the National Hockey League for the Toronto St. Patricks. Loughlin appeared in 14 games during the 1923–24 season. He also played five seasons in the Pacific Coast Hockey Association, and two in the Western Canada Hockey League between 1919 and 1926, retiring in 1927.

He was born in Carroll, Manitoba. His older brother Clem Loughlin was also a professional ice hockey player.

== Career ==
In October 1923, Loughlin was traded for cash to the Toronto St. Patricks where he played 14 games, with 0 points and 2 penalty minutes. He later played for the Regina Capitals, the Edmonton Eskimos, the Winnipeg Maroons, and the Moose Jaw Maroons. He retired in 1927.

== Career statistics ==
=== Regular season and playoffs ===
			Regular season					Playoffs
Season	Team	League	GP	G	A	Pts	PIM	GP	G	A	Pts	PIM
1915–16	Winnipeg Monarchs	WSrHL	1	0	0	0	6	—	—	—	—	—
1916–17	Winnipeg Monarchs	WSrHL	8	5	3	8	10	—	—	—	—	—
1917–18	Winnipeg Vimy	WSrHL	10	10	4	14	12	—	—	—	—	—
1918–19	Victoria Aristocrats	PCHA	7	1	3	4	0	—	—	—	—	—
1918–19	Winnipeg Monarchs	MHL	8	12	3	15	6	—	—	—	—	—
1919–20	Victoria Aristocrats	PCHA	20	4	1	5	19	—	—	—	—	—
1920–21	Victoria Aristocrats	PCHA	24	8	5	13	15	—	—	—	—	—
1921–22	Victoria Aristocrats	PCHA	24	8	3	11	27	2	0	0	0	0
1922–23	Victoria Cougars	PCHA	27	0	0	0	9	2	0	0	0	0
1923–24	Toronto St. Pats	NHL	14	0	0	0	2	—	—	—	—	—
1924–25	Regina Capitals	WCHL	18	0	0	0	6	—	—	—	—	—
1925–26	Edmonton Eskimos	WHL	5	1	0	1	0	—	—	—	—	—
1925–26	Winnipeg Maroons	AHA	3	0	0	0	0	—	—	—	—	—
1926–27	Moose Jaw Maroons	PrHL	5	0	0	0	0	—	—	—	—	—
PCHA totals			102	21	12	33	70	2	0	0	0	0
NHL totals			14	0	0	0	2	—	—	—	—	—

== Awards and achievements ==
- PCHA Second All-Star Team (1921)
