= Thomas Duggan =

Canadian sports promoter

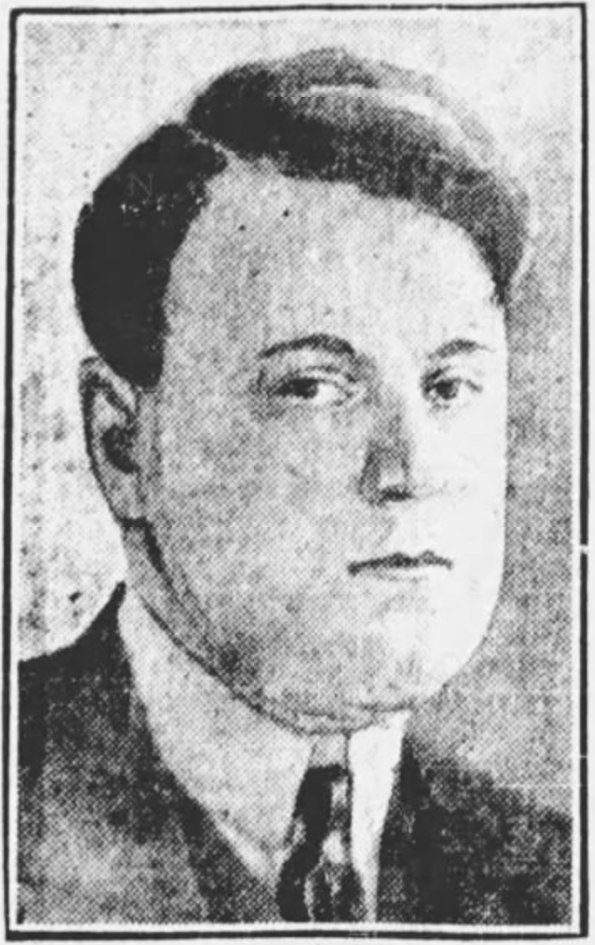
- Duggan c. 1921
- Born: Thomas Joseph Duggan; January 9, 1882; Montreal, Quebec, Canada
- Died: July 22, 1930 (aged 48); Montreal, Quebec, Canada
- Occupation: sports promoter
- Known for: founder of New York Americans and Boston Bruins

Thomas Joseph Duggan (January 9, 1882 – July 22, 1930) was a Canadian sports promoter with interests in horse racing, ice hockey, dog racing and arena management. He was the co-owner of the Mount Royal Arena and founder of the New York Americans and Boston Bruins of the National Hockey League (NHL).

== Biography ==
Tom Duggan was involved in advertising and real estate activities in Montreal before becoming involved in one of his first sports ventures, the Buffalo franchise of baseball's upstart Federal League. When this league failed in 1915, Duggan turned his attention to horse racing, helping to build the Mount Royal track in Montreal and the Devonshire track in Windsor, Ontario, which had opened in 1916 in partnership with American entrepreneur Grant Hugh Browne.

In 1919, when Montreal's Jubilee Rink burned to the ground, Duggan joined up with George Kennedy, the owner of the NHL's Montreal Canadiens, the Jubilee's tenants, to build the Mount Royal Arena on the south side of Mont-Royal avenue between Clark and St. Urbain Streets. From there, Duggan and Kennedy promoted boxing, wrestling and hockey events under the banner of the National Sporting Club, and Duggan tried to get a franchise in the NHL for an English Montreal team to complement the Canadiens. When unsuccessful, he turned his sights southwards and obtained options for NHL franchises in the United States (where the league was looking to expand to thwart competition), selling one franchise to Boston grocery magnate Charles F. Adams and keeping another for himself (financed by bootlegger Bill Dwyer) to play in New York's Madison Square Garden.

Despite setbacks in Boston, where he accused Adams of reneging on the deal to give him half the profits, and New York, where an onerous lease arrangement constrained the profitability of the Americans, Duggan continued to be active in the various attempts to expand the NHL into the US northeast in the later part of the 1920s. At this time he also became interested in greyhound racing, but failed in his attempt to introduce the sport into Chicago Stadium. He had shifted his hopes to establish the sport in New York when he died suddenly at his home in Montreal on July 22, 1930. Coincidentally, Duggan died shortly after being interviewed about the sudden death of Paddy Harmon, the builder of Chicago Stadium and another failed NHL aspirant.

Although Duggan was an important pioneer in the expansion of professional hockey in the United States, his legacy has often been overlooked in favour of other men like Tommy Gorman, Tex Rickard and Bill Dwyer. As Baz O'Meara wrote in the Montreal Daily Star: "Essentially a pioneer and trustful to an unusual degree, he lost a considerable portion of the fruits of his vision." Duggan had predicted that hockey would be the greatest attendance-getter of all sports in America and, while it never rivaled baseball, during the Depression it superseded boxing and other sports and proved the salvation of many arenas, including Madison Square Garden.
