= Chris Speyer (ice hockey) =

Canadian ice hockey player

- Born: February 9, 1902 Toronto, Ontario, Canada
- Died: December 26, 1966 (aged 64) Toronto, Ontario, Canada
- Height: 5 ft 10 in (178 cm)
- Weight: 173 lb (78 kg; 12 st 5 lb)
- Position: Defence
- Shot: Left
- Played for: Toronto St. Pats; New York Americans
- Playing career: 1923–1936

Christopher Francis "Duke" Speyer (February 9, 1902 in Toronto, Ontario – December 26, 1966 in Toronto, Ontario) was a Canadian professional ice hockey forward who played 14 games in the National Hockey League. He played 5 games for the Toronto St. Pats in 1924, and 9 games for the New York Americans in 1934. The rest of his career, which lasted from 1923 to 1936, was mainly spent in the Canadian–American Hockey League.

== Playing career ==
Played with Toronto St. Pats for two seasons, 1923–24 and 1924–25. He then played with the London Panthers with the CPHL, Niagara Falls Cataracts, New Haven Eagles with the CAHL, New York Americans with the NHL, Providence Reds and finally Springfield Indians, both CAHL. He retired 1935–36 season.

== Career statistics ==
=== Regular season and playoffs ===
			Regular season					Playoffs
Season	Team	League	GP	G	A	Pts	PIM	GP	G	A	Pts	PIM
1921–22	Toronto Granites	OHA Jr	5	0	1	1	—	—	—	—	—	—
1922–23	Toronto Aura Lee	OHA Sr	12	1	0	1	—	—	—	—	—	—
1923–24	Toronto St. Pats	NHL	3	0	0	0	0	—	—	—	—	—
1923–24	Toronto Aura Lee	OHA Sr	6	3	1	4	—	—	—	—	—	—
1924–25	Toronto St. Pats	NHL	2	0	0	0	0	—	—	—	—	—
1926–27	Niagara Falls Cataracts	Can-Pro	20	3	0	3	22	—	—	—	—	—
1926–27	London Panthers	Can-Pro	4	0	0	0	2	4	0	0	0	0
1927–28	Niagara Falls Cataracts	Can-Pro	38	3	5	8	46	—	—	—	—	—
1928–29	New Haven Eagles	Can-Am	39	3	2	5	38	2	0	0	0	6
1929–30	New Haven Eagles	Can-Am	40	8	8	16	87	—	—	—	—	—
1930–31	New Haven Eagles	Can-Am	40	8	10	18	83	—	—	—	—	—
1931–32	New Haven Eagles	Can-Am	38	6	13	19	53	2	1	1	2	2
1932–33	New Haven Eagles	Can-Am	48	13	13	26	50	—	—	—	—	—
1933–34	New York Americans	NHL	9	0	0	0	0	—	—	—	—	—
1933–34	Syracuse Stars	IHL	4	0	0	0	0	—	—	—	—	—
1933–34	New Haven Eagles	Can-Am	20	2	3	5	10	—	—	—	—	—
1934–35	Providence Reds	Can-Am	47	7	3	10	21	6	0	1	1	0
1935–36	Springfield Indians	Can-Am	48	8	12	20	18	2	0	1	1	2
Can-Am totals			320	55	64	119	360	12	1	3	4	10
NHL totals			14	0	0	0	0	—	—	—	—	—
