= Alex McKinnon (ice hockey) =

Canadian ice hockey player

- Born: April 17, 1895 Sault Ste. Marie, Ontario, Canada
- Died: October 8, 1949 (aged 54)
- Height: 5 ft 8 in (173 cm)
- Weight: 175 lb (79 kg; 12 st 7 lb)
- Position: Right wing
- Shot: Right
- Played for: Chicago Black Hawks; New York Americans; Hamilton Tigers
- Playing career: 1913–1930

Robert Alexander McKinnon (April 17, 1895 – October 8, 1949) was a Canadian ice hockey forward who played five seasons in the National Hockey League for the Hamilton Tigers, New York Americans and Chicago Black Hawks between 1924 and 1929. He also played several years of amateur hockey, primarily with the Sudbury Wolves. Prior to turning professional McKinnon served in World War I.

== Playing career ==
After serving his country for two years during World War I, McKinnon joined the Sudbury Wolves of the Northern Ontario Hockey Association, with whom he had played a few games over three seasons prior to his tour with the army. In 1923–24 he joined the Pittsburgh Yellow Jackets of the United States Amateur Hockey Association, and he made his NHL debut in 1924–25 with the Hamilton Tigers. In that season, he scored eight goals with three assists, mostly while playing defence.

The Hamilton franchise moved prior to the 1925–26 season, becoming the New York Americans. McKinnon moved with the team, and played with them for three seasons. He was traded to the Chicago Black Hawks for the 1928–29 season in exchange for Charley McVeigh. He played one season for Chicago, and subsequently retired from playing to become a coach for the Sudbury Wolves.

== Career statistics ==
=== Regular season and playoffs ===
			Regular season					Playoffs
Season	Team	League	GP	G	A	Pts	PIM	GP	G	A	Pts	PIM
1913–14	Sudbury Wolves	NOHA	4	1	0	1	0	—	—	—	—	—
1914–15	Sudbury Wolves	NOHA	13	15	4	19	—	—	—	—	—	—
1914–15	Sudbury Wolves	Al-Cup	—	—	—	—	—	3	1	0	1	0
1915–16	Sudbury Wolves	Exhib	—	—	—	—	—	—	—	—	—	—
1916–17	Hamilton 227th Battalion	OHA	6	5	0	5	—	—	—	—	—	—
1918–19	Sudbury Wolves	NOHA	—	—	—	—	—	—	—	—	—	—
1919–20	Sudbury Wolves	NOHA	6	5	10	15	10	7	3	7	10	8
1920–21	Sudbury Wolves	NOHA	9	7	5	12	19	—	—	—	—	—
1921–22	Sudbury Wolves	NOHA	9	10	8	18	18	—	—	—	—	—
1922–23	Sudbury Wolves	NOHA	4	1	2	3	6	2	2	0	2	2
1923–24	Pittsburgh Yellow Jackets	USAHA	20	9	0	9	—	13	4	0	4	—
1924–25	Hamilton Tigers	NHL	29	8	3	11	47	—	—	—	—	—
1925–26	New York Americans	NHL	35	5	3	8	34	—	—	—	—	—
1926–27	New York Americans	NHL	42	2	1	3	29	—	—	—	—	—
1927–28	New York Americans	NHL	43	3	3	6	71	—	—	—	—	—
1928–29	Chicago Black Hawks	NHL	44	1	1	2	56	—	—	—	—	—
1929–30	Sudbury Wolves	NOHA	7	1	1	2	0	—	—	—	—	—
NHL totals			193	19	11	30	237	—	—	—	—	—
