= Billy Boucher =

Canadian ice hockey player (1899–1958)

- Born: November 10, 1899 Ottawa, Ontario, Canada
- Died: November 10, 1958 (aged 59)
- Height: 5 ft 7 in (170 cm)
- Weight: 155 lb (70 kg; 11 st 1 lb)
- Position: Right wing
- Shot: Right
- Played for: Hamilton Tigers; Montreal Canadiens; Boston Bruins; New York Americans
- Playing career: 1921–1933

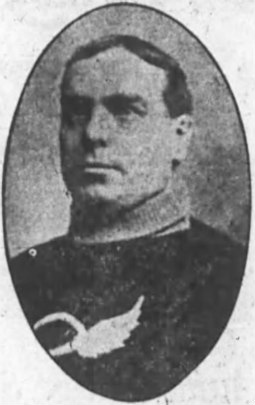
Billy's father Tom Boucher while a rugby football player at Ottawa College in the 1890s.

William Martin Boucher (November 10, 1899 – November 10, 1958) was a Canadian professional ice hockey player. Boucher played in the National Hockey League (NHL) with the Hamilton Tigers, Montreal Canadiens, Boston Bruins and New York Americans from 1921 to 1928. With the Canadiens he won the Stanley Cup in 1924. His brothers Bobby, Frank and Georges were also professional ice hockey players and all four were members of Stanley Cup championship teams.

== Playing career ==
He played in the National Hockey League for the Hamilton Tigers, Montreal Canadiens, Boston Bruins and New York Americans. He also played for the New Haven Eagles and Bronx Tigers of the Canadian-American Hockey League. Boucher signed with the Canadiens in 1921, and scored 17 goals in his rookie season. Boucher scored 24 goals in 24 games in his second season. In his third season, 1923–24 Boucher was placed on a line with rookie Howie Morenz and Aurele Joliat in a high-scoring trio. Boucher led the Canadiens in scoring, and runner-up in the league. The team defeated defending champion Ottawa in the NHA playoffs and the Calgary Tigers in the Stanley Cup Finals. When the team played its first game in the Montreal Forum in November 1924, Boucher scored the first goal in the facility, and the first hat trick. In the 1926–27 season, Boucher was loaned to the Boston Bruins before being traded to the New York Americans, where he finished his NHL career.

== Personal life ==
Born in Ottawa, Ontario, Billy was one of six sons born to Tom Boucher and Annie Carroll: Billy, Bobby, Carroll, Frank, George and Joseph and two sisters, Irene and Lily. His paternal grandfather, Antoine Boucher was French while his other grandparents were of Irish descent. Tom Boucher played rugby football, winning the Canadian championship in 1894, 1896, 1897 and 1901 with teams in Ottawa. Boucher attended St. Joseph's Separate School in Ottawa. Boucher married Theresa Payette in 1921. They had two sons: E. William and Robert J., and daughter June.

After finishing with hockey, Boucher returned to Ottawa and worked for the Defence Department of the Canadian government. Boucher died of a heart attack on his 59th birthday, November 10, 1958. Boucher was buried in Notre Dame Cemetery in Ottawa.

== Career statistics ==
=== Regular season and playoffs ===
			Regular season					Playoffs
Season	Team	League	GP	G	A	Pts	PIM	GP	G	A	Pts	PIM
1915–16	Creighton	HS-CA	—	—	—	—	—	—	—	—	—	—
1916–17	Ottawa Munitions	OCJHL	10	1	0	1	6	—	—	—	—	—
1917–18	Ottawa Munitions	OCHL	6	5	0	5	24	1	1	0	1	0
1918–19	Ottawa Munitions	OCHL	8	6	3	9	18	—	—	—	—	—
1919–20	Ottawa Munitions	OCHL	8	4	0	4	—	5	11	4	15	—
1920–21	Iroquois Falls Papermakers	NOHA	5	5	0	5	—	—	—	—	—	—
1921–22	Montreal Canadiens	NHL	24	17	5	22	18	—	—	—	—	—
1922–23	Montreal Canadiens	NHL	24	24	7	31	55	2	1	0	1	2
1923–24	Montreal Canadiens	NHL	23	16	6	22	48	2	1	0	1	9
1923–24	Montreal Canadiens	St-Cup	—	—	—	—	—	4	5	1	6	6
1924–25	Montreal Canadiens	NHL	30	17	13	30	92	2	1	0	1	4
1924–25	Montreal Canadiens	St-Cup	—	—	—	—	—	4	1	1	2	13
1925–26	Montreal Canadiens	NHL	34	8	5	13	112	—	—	—	—	—
1926–27	Montreal Canadiens	NHL	21	4	0	4	14	—	—	—	—	—
1926–27	Boston Bruins	NHL	14	2	0	2	12	8	0	0	0	2
1927–28	New York Americans	NHL	43	5	2	7	58	—	—	—	—	—
1928–29	New Haven Eagles	Can-Am	38	11	1	12	117	2	0	0	0	4
1929–30	New Haven Eagles	Can-Am	32	8	7	15	54	—	—	—	—	—
1930–31	New Haven Eagles	Can-Am	38	20	8	28	98	—	—	—	—	—
1931–32	Bronx Tigers	Can-Am	39	3	4	7	25	1	0	0	0	0
1932–33	Quebec Granites	ECHA	—	—	—	—	—	—	—	—	—	—
NHL totals			213	93	38	131	409	12	2	0	2	8
