= Charles Querrie =

Canadian hockey team manager

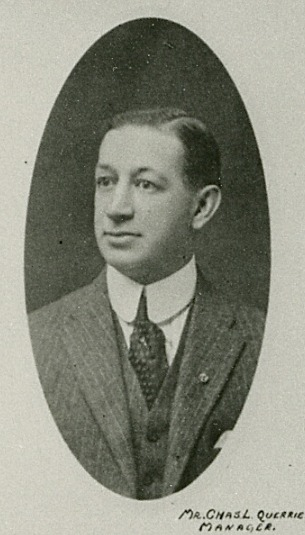
- Querrie in the 1917–18 season.
- Born: Charles Laurens Querrie; July 25, 1877; Markham, Ontario, Canada
- Died: April 5, 1950 (aged 72); Toronto, Ontario, Canada
- Occupations: Former ice hockey coach and general manager

Charles Laurens Querrie (July 25, 1877 – April 5, 1950) was the first General Manager of the Toronto Maple Leafs, at the time called the Toronto Arenas (1917–20) and the Toronto St. Patricks (1920–27).

Querrie was born in Markham, Ontario, around the area now known as Victoria Square.

== Career ==
Querrie won two Stanley Cups with the team, in 1917–18 and again in 1921–22. Prior to his career in hockey coaching and management, Querrie was a prominent lacrosse player in amateur and professional leagues in his hometown of Markham (member of Lacrosse Hall of Fame) as well as in Toronto.

In 1927 Querrie sold his majority stake of the St. Pat's to Conn Smythe, who had purchased the team along with several partners including St. Pat's minority owner Jack Bickell.

He was inducted into the Canadian Lacrosse Hall of Fame as a field player in 1965, the first year of inductees.

== Later years ==
He died on April 5, 1950, at Toronto General Hospital of a heart attack.

== Coaching record ==
| Team | Year | Regular Season | | | | | | | Post Season |
| Team | Year | G | W | L | T | OTL | Pts | Finish | Result |
|---|---|---|---|---|---|---|---|---|---|
| Toronto St. Patricks | 1922–23 | 19 | 11 | 7 | 1 | – | 23 | 3rd in NHL | Did not qualify |
| Toronto St. Patricks | 1923–24 | 24 | 10 | 14 | 0 | – | 20 | 3rd in NHL | Did not qualify |
| Toronto St. Patricks | 1926–27 | 29 | 8 | 17 | 4 | – | 20 | 5th in Canadian | Resigned |
| Total | | 72 | 29 | 38 | 5 | | | | |

| Preceded by Toronto Arena Company | Principal owner, Toronto Maple Leafs; 1919–1927 | Succeeded by Conn Smythe |
| Preceded by Position created | General Manager of the Toronto; Arenas/St. Particks/Maple Leafs; 1917–27 | Succeeded by Conn Smythe |
| Preceded by George O'Donoghue; Eddie Powers | Head coach of the Toronto St. Patricks; 1922-24; 1926-27 | Succeeded by Eddie Powers; Mike Rodden |
