= Amos Arbour =

Canadian ice hockey player

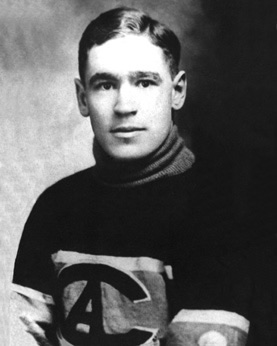
- Born: January 26, 1895 Waubaushene, Ontario, Canada
- Died: November 1, 1943 (aged 48) Orillia, Ontario, Canada
- Height: 5 ft 8 in (173 cm)
- Weight: 160 lb (73 kg; 11 st 6 lb)
- Position: Left wing
- Shot: Left
- Played for: Montreal Canadiens; Toronto 228th Battalion; Hamilton Tigers; Toronto St. Patricks
- Playing career: 1915–1924

Joseph Amos Hermas "Butch" Arbour (January 26, 1895 – November 1, 1943) was a Canadian professional ice hockey player. A left winger, Arbour played two seasons in the National Hockey Association and six seasons in the National Hockey League for Montreal Canadiens, Hamilton Tigers and Toronto St. Patricks. Arbour was a member of the Montreal Canadiens 1916 Stanley Cup-winning team.

His World War I attestation papers list his trade or calling as a butcher.

He died in Orillia, Ontario.

== Career statistics ==
=== Regular season and playoffs ===
			Regular season					Playoffs
Season	Team	League	GP	G	A	Pts	PIM	GP	G	A	Pts	PIM
1914–15	Victoria Harbour Station	OHA	—	—	—	—	—	—	—	—	—	—
1915–16	Montreal Canadiens	NHA	20	5	0	5	6	—	—	—	—	—
1915–16	Montreal Canadiens	St-Cup	—	—	—	—	—	4	3	0	3	11
1916–17	Toronto 228th Battalion	NHA	10	13	2	15	6	—	—	—	—	—
1918–19	Montreal Canadiens	NHL	1	0	0	0	0	—	—	—	—	—
1919–20	Montreal Canadiens	NHL	22	21	5	26	13	—	—	—	—	—
1920–21	Montreal Canadiens	NHL	23	15	3	18	40	—	—	—	—	—
1921–22	Hamilton Tigers	NHL	23	9	6	15	8	—	—	—	—	—
1922–23	Hamilton Tigers	NHL	23	6	3	9	12	—	—	—	—	—
1923–24	Toronto St. Patricks	NHL	21	1	3	4	4	—	—	—	—	—
NHA totals			30	18	2	20	12	—	—	—	—	—
NHL totals			113	52	20	72	77	—	—	—	—	—

== Transactions ==
- January 23, 1919 – Signed as a free agent by Montreal Canadiens
- November 26, 1921 – Traded to Hamilton Tigers by Montreal with Harry Mummery for Sprague Cleghorn
- December 14, 1923 – Traded to Toronto by Hamilton with Bert Corbeau and George Carey for Ken Randall, the NHL rights to Corb Denneny and cash
