= Leth Graham =

Canadian ice hockey player

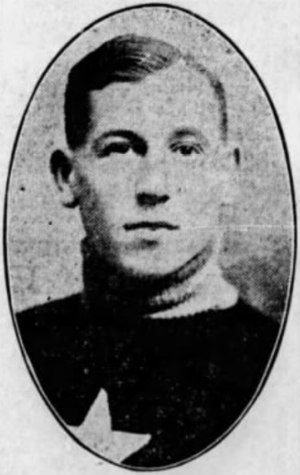
- Graham with the Ottawa Stars lacrosse team around 1912
- Born: October 10, 1894 Ottawa, Ontario, Canada
- Died: January 18, 1944 (aged 49) Wrightville, Quebec, Canada
- Height: 5 ft 6 in (168 cm)
- Weight: 150 lb (68 kg; 10 st 10 lb)
- Position: Left wing
- Shot: Left
- Played for: Ottawa Stewartons; Ottawa Senators; Hamilton Tigers
- Playing career: 1913–1926

Andrew Letham Graham (October 10, 1894 – January 18, 1944) was a Canadian ice hockey player. Graham played left wing for six seasons in the National Hockey League for the Ottawa Senators and Hamilton Tigers. He was born in Ottawa, Ontario. He won the Stanley Cup with Ottawa in 1921 and retired in 1925. He also appeared in the 1915 Stanley Cup Final with the Ottawa Hockey Club against the Vancouver Millionaires, a losing effort.

== Life outside of hockey career ==
Graham participated in World War I and did not play any competitive hockey between the 1915–16 and 1919–20 seasons. While serving in Europe he was exposed to poison gas which permanently affected his physical condition and his level of play.

On July 2, 1939, Graham was seriously injured with severe lacerations to his scalp when his car flew over a fence and turned over in a ditch in a single-vehicle accident in Ottawa. He died less than five years later on January 18, 1944, of a sudden heart attack in Wrightville, Quebec while sitting in the grill room of the Regal Hotel, St. Joseph's Boulevard.

== Career statistics ==
=== Regular season and playoffs ===
			Regular season					Playoffs
Season	Team	League	GP	G	A	Pts	PIM	GP	G	A	Pts	PIM
1909–10	Hull Excelsiors	H-OHL	5	4	0	4	—	—	—	—	—	—
1910–11	Ottawa New Edinburghs	IPAHU	1	1	0	1	0	—	—	—	—	—
1910–11	Ottawa Stewartons	OCHL	5	2	0	2	3	—	—	—	—	—
1911–12	Ottawa Stewartons	IPAHU	8	8	0	8	6	—	—	—	—	—
1912–13	Ottawa Stewartons	IPAHU	7	7	0	7	18	—	—	—	—	—
1913–14	Ottawa Senators	NHA	17	1	1	2	2	—	—	—	—	—
1914–15	Ottawa Senators	NHA	17	9	3	12	34	5	1	0	1	—
1920–21	Ottawa Senators	NHL	14	0	0	0	0	1	0	0	0	0
1921–22	Ottawa Senators	NHL	1	2	0	2	0	—	—	—	—	—
1922–23	Hamilton Tigers	NHL	5	1	0	1	0	—	—	—	—	—
1923–24	Ottawa Senators	NHL	3	0	0	0	0	—	—	—	—	—
1924–25	Ottawa Senators	NHL	3	0	0	0	0	—	—	—	—	—
NHL totals			26	3	0	3	0	1	0	0	0	0
