= Howie Lockhart =

Canadian ice hockey player

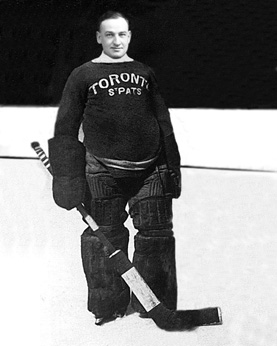
- Lockhart with the Toronto St. Pats
- Born: April 22, 1896 North Bay, Ontario, Canada
- Died: August 2, 1956 (aged 60) Haliburton, Ontario, Canada
- Height: 5 ft 8 in (173 cm)
- Weight: 180 lb (82 kg; 12 st 12 lb)
- Position: Goaltender
- Caught: Left
- Played for: Hamilton Tigers
- Playing career: 1916–1925

Howard Bond Lockhart (April 22, 1896 - August 2, 1956) was a Canadian ice hockey goaltender who played six seasons in the National Hockey Association and the National Hockey League for the Northern Fusiliers, Toronto St. Pats, Quebec Bulldogs, Hamilton Tigers and Boston Bruins. He played 12 games in the NHA and 59 in the NHL and finished with a combined record of 23 wins and 46 losses.

The nickname "Holes" is associated with Lockhart, but there are no contemporaneous uses of the term for him, and it appears to have been coined by hockey writer Stan Fischler sometime in the 1970s.

Lockhart holds the records for the most five-or-more goal games allowed to opposing players, with four.

== Career statistics ==
=== Regular season and playoffs ===
			Regular season								Playoffs
Season	Team	League	GP	W	L	T	Min	GA	SO	GAA	GP	W	L	T	Min	GA	SO	GAA
1911–12	North Bay Juniors	NOJHA	—	—	—	—	—	—	—	—	—	—	—	—	—	—	—	—
1912–13	North Bay Seniors	NOHA	8	5	3	0	480	36	0	4.50	2	1	1	0	120	16	0	8.00
1913–14	North Bay Intermediates	NOHA-Int	—	—	—	—	—	—	—	—	—	—	—	—	—	—	—	—
1914–15	North Bay Intermediates	NOHA-Int	—	—	—	—	—	—	—	—	—	—	—	—	—	—	—	—
1915–16	North Bay Intermediates	NOHA-Int	—	—	—	—	—	—	—	—	—	—	—	—	—	—	—	—
1916–17	Toronto 228th Battalion	NHA	12	7	5	0	720	69	1	5.75	—	—	—	—	—	—	—	—
1919–20	Toronto St. Pats	NHL	7	4	2	0	310	25	0	4.84	—	—	—	—	—	—	—	—
1919–20	Quebec Bulldogs	NHL	1	0	1	0	60	11	0	11.00	—	—	—	—	—	—	—	—
1920–21	Hamilton Tigers	NHL	24	6	18	0	1454	132	1	5.45	—	—	—	—	—	—	—	—
1921–22	Hamilton Tigers	NHL	24	6	17	0	1408	103	0	4.39	—	—	—	—	—	—	—	—
1923–24	Toronto St. Pats	NHL	1	0	1	0	60	5	0	5.00	—	—	—	—	—	—	—	—
1924–25	Boston Bruins	NHL	2	0	2	0	120	11	0	5.50	—	—	—	—	—	—	—	—
1926–27	Hamilton Tigers	Can-Pro	19	9	9	1	1165	50	0	1.58	—	—	—	—	—	—	—	—
NHA totals			12	7	5	0	720	69	1	5.75	—	—	—	—	—	—	—	—
NHL totals			59	16	41	0	3413	287	1	5.05	—	—	—	—	—	—	—	—
