= Ganton Scott =

Canadian ice hockey player

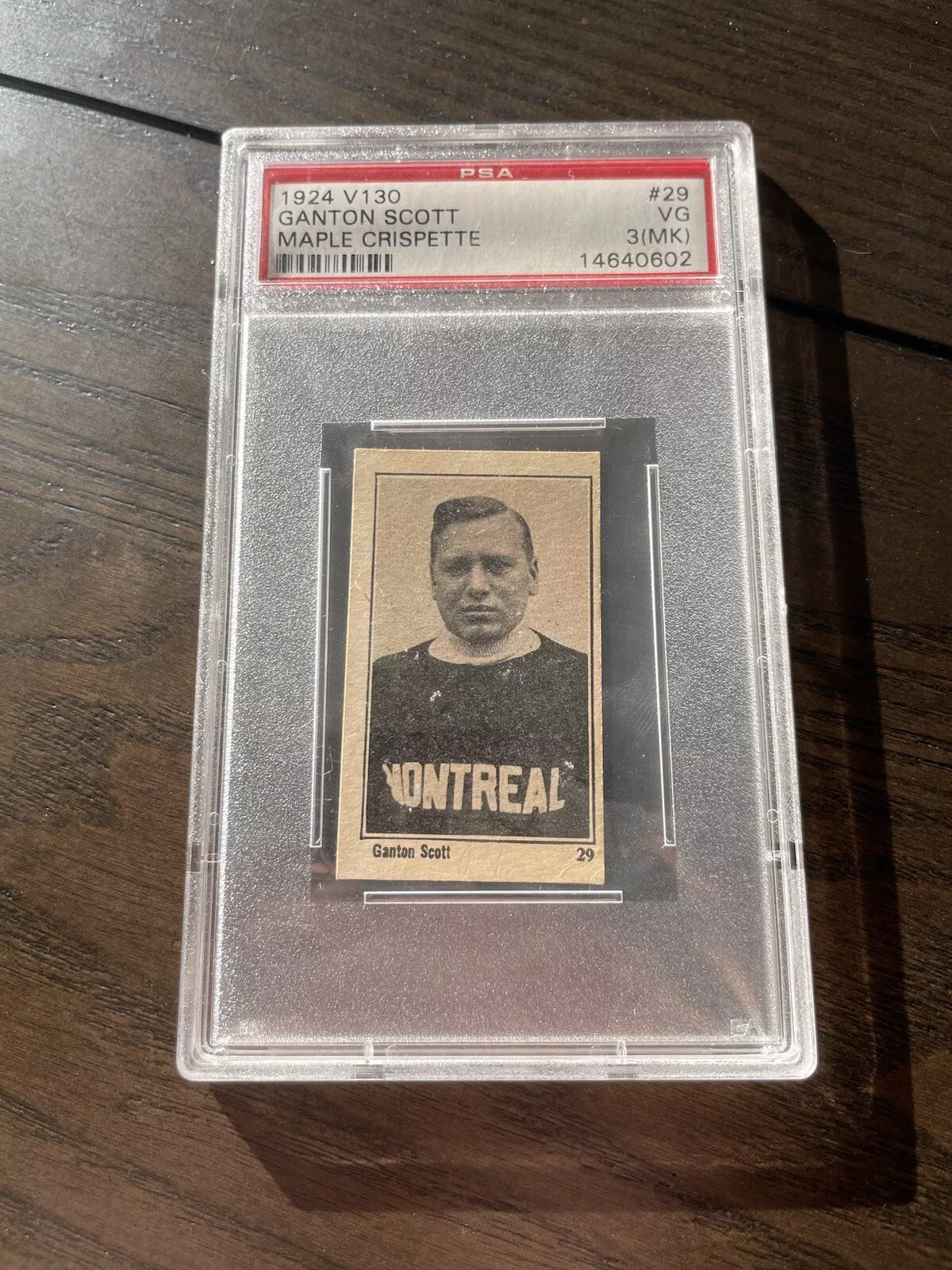
- Born: March 23, 1903 Little Current, Ontario, Canada
- Died: June 9, 1977 (aged 74) San Diego, California, US
- Height: 5 ft 9 in (175 cm)
- Weight: 165 lb (75 kg; 11 st 11 lb)
- Position: Right wing
- Shot: Right
- Played for: Hamilton Tigers; Montreal Maroons; Toronto St. Pats; Toronto Maple Leafs
- Playing career: 1922–1932

Ganton Scott (March 23, 1903 – June 9, 1977) was a Canadian ice hockey right winger who played four seasons in the National Hockey League during the 1920s for the Toronto St. Pats, Hamilton Tigers, Montreal Maroons and Toronto Maple Leafs. He also played in the Western Hockey League and the California Hockey League, retiring in 1932 He was born in Little Current, Ontario, and died in San Diego, California.

== Playing career ==
As a teenage amateur player, Scott first attracted the attention of professional scouts in 1922 when he led the Toronto Aura Lee junior team in scoring. That team, which also featured future NHL'ers "Baldy" Cotton and Alfie Moore, won the Eastern Canadian championship and was eliminated by the eventual Memorial Cup champion Fort William War Veterans. That October, Scott signed a professional contract to play for the Toronto St. Pats.

Despite his reputation as a prolific scorer in juniors, Scott failed to thrive in the NHL. His playing time in Toronto dwindled, and after 21 scoreless games, he was traded to the Hamilton Tigers in January 1924. The Tigers declined to retain him, and Scott signed with the Montreal Maroons as a free agent in October 1924. He played a career-high 28 games for the Maroons, scoring his only NHL goal on January 17, 1925, against his former St. Pats team.

With only 1 goal and 1 assist in 53 career games, Scott left the NHL to sign with the Edmonton Eskimos of the Western Hockey League in December 1925. After 7 scoreless games, his rights were traded to the Saskatoon Crescents. Scott played 6 games in Saskatoon, scoring 1 assist. In February, he left the financially unstable WHL to sign with the Palais-de-Glace team of the upstart California Professional Hockey League.

Now playing at a much lower level of competition, Scott became a star in the California circuit. He played for 6 different teams between 1926 and 1932, leading the league in goals and points in 1928–29. From 1927–28 to 1932–33, the only seasons in which complete CPHL statistics are available, Scott led all players in goals with 86 and was second in points with 118.

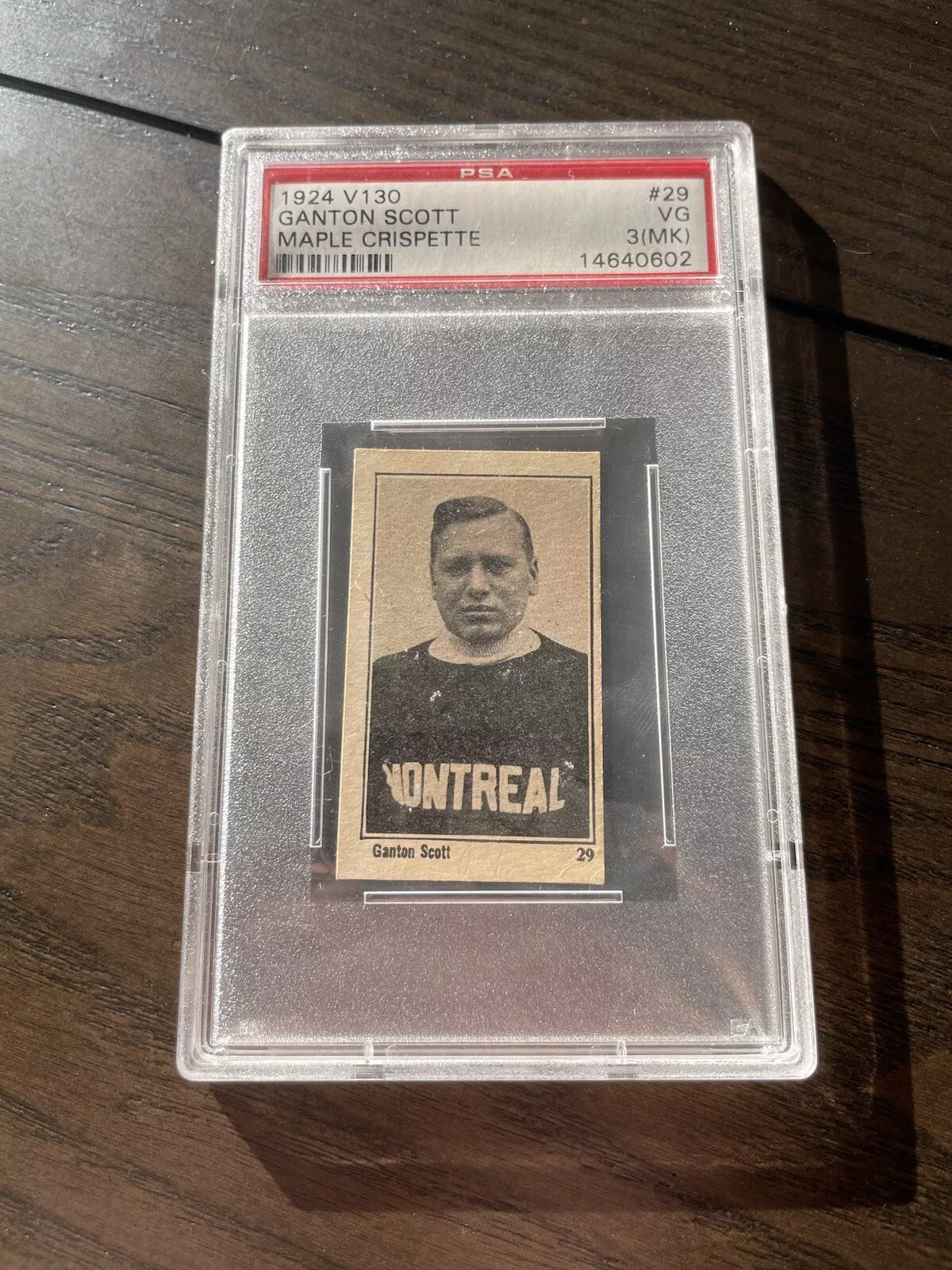
Ganton Scott's 1924 Maple Crispette hockey card

== Career statistics ==
=== Regular season and playoffs ===
			Regular season					Playoffs
Season	Team	League	GP	G	A	Pts	PIM	GP	G	A	Pts	PIM
1921–22	Toronto Aura Lee	OHA Jr	6	11	1	12	—	—	—	—	—	—
1922–23	Toronto St. Pats	NHL	17	0	0	0	0	—	—	—	—	—
1923–24	Toronto St. Pats	NHL	4	0	0	0	0	—	—	—	—	—
1923–24	Hamilton Tigers	NHL	8	0	0	0	0	—	—	—	—	—
1924–25	Montreal Maroons	NHL	28	1	1	2	0	—	—	—	—	—
1925–26	Edmonton Eskimos	WHL	7	0	1	1	0	—	—	—	—	—
1925–26	Saskatoon Crescents	WHL	6	0	1	1	2	—	—	—	—	—
1925–26	Los Angeles Palais-de-Glace	CPHL	—	—	—	—	—	—	—	—	—	—
1926–27	Los Angeles Richfields	CPHL	—	—	—	—	—	—	—	—	—	—
1927–28	Los Angeles Richfields	CPHL	—	—	—	—	—	—	—	—	—	—
1928–29	San Francisco Tigers	CPHL	—	31	6	37	32	—	—	—	—	—
1929–30	San Francisco Tigers	CPHL	—	12	6	18	—	—	—	—	—	—
1930–31	San Francisco Tigers	CPHL	—	11	10	21	29	—	—	—	—	—
1931–32	Oakland Sheiks	CPHL	—	15	5	20	—	—	—	—	—	—
NHL totals			57	1	1	2	0	—	—	—	—	—
