= Barton Street Arena =

Sports arena in Hamilton, Ontario, Canada

- Interactive map of Barton Street Arena
- Location: Hamilton, Ontario, Canada
- Coordinates: 43°15′25″N 79°50′47″W
- Capacity: 4,500 (originally); 2,800 (1977)
- Surface: Multi-surface

Construction
- Opened: 1910
- Demolished: 1977

Tenants
- Hamilton Tigers (NHL) (1920–1925); Hamilton Tigers (CPHL) (1926-1930); Hamilton Tiger Cubs (1953–1960); Hamilton Red Wings (1960–1974); Hamilton Fincups (1974–1977)

Barton Street Arena, also known as the Hamilton Forum, was the main sports arena located in Hamilton, Ontario, on Barton Street between Sanford Street and Wentworth Street. It was built in 1910 at what was at that time the east end of the city by Andrew Ross (original owner) who was a local Hamilton businessman.

Originally, the arena had a seating capacity of 4,500 and standing room for roughly 500 people. By 1977 it had a seating capacity of 2800 people. It was torn down in 1977 when the ice-making equipment broke down and the city decided it would be cheaper to demolish the arena than replace the old machinery. A new and much larger arena, Copps Coliseum, was constructed six years later. Today, the Barton Street Arena site is occupied by residential housing.

There were six entrances—three on Barton, and three on Bristol Street. The north side of the arena (the Barton Street side) housed the coat-check and the ladies' washroom. The five dressing rooms were located on the Bristol Street side, as well as a "smoking room". The press box was also on the south side, above the stands. The building was steam heated so patrons could watch the game in comfort. The ice surface itself, at 200-feet by 80-feet, was lit by twenty-eight five-hundred-candle-power lights. After the first National Hockey League game was played in the arena between Hamilton and the Montreal Canadiens; Montreal owner George Kennedy commented: "This is a fine arena. It's a lot better than I looked for. The lighting is excellent, the seating fine, and the ice surface the largest in the NHL. I am surely surprised."

It was home arena to the NHL's Hamilton Tigers, the minor pro Hamilton Tigers, and the OHL's Hamilton Tiger Cubs, Hamilton Red Wings and Hamilton Fincups. The arena hosted the first game of the 1962 Memorial Cup. The Hamilton Red Wings won that game 5–2 versus the Edmonton Oil Kings.

Licences for private commercial radio stations in Canada were first granted in 1922, when Hamilton's CKOC went on the air. In 1923, Ivan Miller began broadcasting games on CKOC from the Barton Street Arena.

== Sources ==
- The OHL Arena & Travel Guide - Hamilton Forum
- Hamilton's Hockey Tigers, Sam Wesley w/ David Wesley (James Lorimer & Company Ltd., 2005)
- 20th Century Hockey Chronicle, Stan Fischler, Shirley Fischler, Morgan Hughes, Joseph Romain, James Duplacey (Publications International Ltd., 1999)
- Dictionary of Hamilton Biography, Vol III.(1925–39), Thomas Bailey Melville (W.L. Griffin Ltd., 1981)
- Hamilton Herald Newspaper articles, (1920–1925)
