= Ken Randall =

Canadian ice hockey player

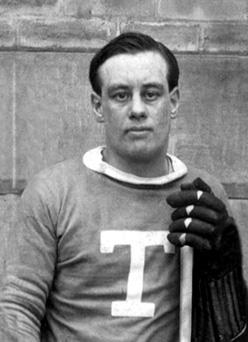
- Born: December 14, 1887 Kingston, Ontario, Canada
- Died: June 14, 1947 (aged 58) Toronto, Ontario, Canada
- Height: 5 ft 10 in (178 cm)
- Weight: 180 lb (82 kg; 12 st 12 lb)
- Position: Right wing/Defence
- Shot: Right
- Played for: Brantford Indians (OPHL); Port Hope Professionals (EOPHL); Saskatoon Hoo Hoos (SPHL); Saskatoon Real Estate (SPHL); Toronto Blueshirts (NHA); Sydney Millionaires (MaPHL); Montreal Wanderers (NHA); Toronto Arenas (NHL); Toronto St. Patricks (OPHL); Hamilton Tigers (NHL); New York Americans (NHL); Niagara-Falls Hamilton (Can-Pro HL); Providence Reds (CAHL); Ottawa Patricias (OPHL)
- Playing career: 1909–1931

Kenneth Fenwick "The Pepper Kid" Randall (December 14, 1887 – June 14, 1947) was a Canadian professional ice hockey player who played for 20 seasons, including ten seasons in the National Hockey League from 1917 to 1927 for the Toronto Arenas, Toronto St. Patricks, Hamilton Tigers and New York Americans. He was a two-time Stanley Cup Champion.

== Playing career ==
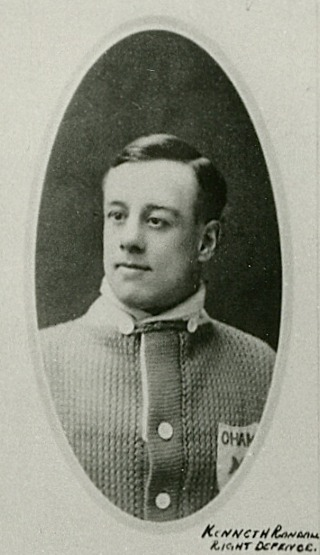
Randall with the Toronto Arenas.

Randall had a long and varied playing career at a time when the professional ice hockey world was changing. He was an accomplished scorer when playing forward, and was a good defencemen which he became exclusively later in his career. He turned professional in the Ontario Professional Hockey League (OPHL), and played in the Maritime Professional Hockey League, the Eastern Ontario Professional Hockey League and the Saskatchewan Professional Hockey League before joining the Toronto Blueshirts of the National Hockey Association (NHA) in 1915. He played for the organization until 1923, as it changed from the Blueshirts to Arenas to St. Patricks, winning two Stanley Cups, in 1918 and 1922.

In 1923, Randall joined the Hamilton Tigers, which in 1924 became embroiled in a labor conflict and his contract was sold to the new New York Americans, for which he played two years before becoming a player coach with the Providence Reds. He became a full-time coach in 1928, but still had some playing time left in him, playing for the Oshawa Patricias when the OPHL was revived in 1930.

== Career statistics ==
=== Regular season and playoffs ===
			Regular season					Playoffs
Season	Team	League	GP	G	A	Pts	PIM	GP	G	A	Pts	PIM
1906–07	Lindsay Midgets	OHA-Jr.	4	2	0	2	—	6	9	0	9	—
1907–08	Lindsay Midgets	OHA-Jr.	6	10	0	10	—	—	—	—	—	—
1908–09	Lindsay Midgets	OHA-Jr.	—	—	—	—	—	—	—	—	—	—
1909–10	Brantford Indians	OPHL	10	10	0	10	—	—	—	—	—	—
1910–11	Port Hope Pros	EOPHL	6	19	0	19	—	—	—	—	—	—
1911–12	Montreal Wanderers	NHA	1	0	0	0	0	—	—	—	—	—
1911–12	Saskatoon Hoo-Hoos	Sask-Pro	1	0	0	0	0	—	—	—	—	—
1911–12	Saskatoon Real Estates	Sask-Pro	2	2	0	2	—	—	—	—	—	—
1912–13	Toronto Blueshirts	NHA	2	0	0	0	0	—	—	—	—	—
1912–13	Sydney Millionaires	MaPHL	12	17	0	17	18	2	1	0	1	0
1913–14	Sydney Millionaires	MaPHL	24	28	0	28	68	2	5	0	5	8
1914–15	Sydney Millionaires	MaPHL	8	11	0	11	17	—	—	—	—	—
1915–16	Toronto Blueshirts	NHA	24	7	5	12	111	—	—	—	—	—
1916–17	Toronto Blueshirts	NHA	13	8	2	10	64	—	—	—	—	—
1916–17	Montreal Wanderers	NHA	5	3	2	5	40	—	—	—	—	—
1917–18	Toronto Arenas	NHL	21	12	2	14	96	2	1	1	2	12
1917–18	Toronto Arenas	St-Cup	—	—	—	—	—	5	1	0	1	12
1918–19	Toronto Arenas	NHL	14	8	6	14	27	—	—	—	—	—
1919–20	Toronto St. Patricks	NHL	22	10	8	18	42	—	—	—	—	—
1920–21	Toronto St. Patricks	NHL	22	6	5	11	74	2	0	0	0	11
1921–22	Toronto St. Patricks	NHL	24	10	6	16	32	2	1	0	1	4
1921–22	Toronto St. Patricks	St-Cup	—	—	—	—	—	4	1	0	1	22
1922–23	Toronto St. Patricks	NHL	24	3	5	8	58	—	—	—	—	—
1923–24	Hamilton Tigers	NHL	24	7	6	13	58	—	—	—	—	—
1924–25	Hamilton Tigers	NHL	30	8	10	18	52	—	—	—	—	—
1925–26	New York Americans	NHL	34	4	2	6	94	—	—	—	—	—
1926–27	New York Americans	NHL	3	0	0	0	0	—	—	—	—	—
1926–27	Niagara Falls Cataracts	Can-Pro	15	4	0	4	25	—	—	—	—	—
1926–27	Hamilton Tigers	Can-Pro	13	3	2	5	21	2	0	0	0	7
1927–28	Providence Reds	Can-Am	19	0	0	0	6	—	—	—	—	—
1930–31	Ottawa Patricias	OPHL	2	0	0	0	0	7	0	0	0	4
NHA totals			45	18	9	27	215	—	—	—	—	—
NHL totals			218	68	50	118	533	6	2	1	3	27

== Coaching record ==
Team	Year	Regular season						Post season
Team	Year	G	W	L	T	Pts	Division rank	Result
Hamilton Tigers	1923–24	14	6	8	0	(12)	4th in NHL	(interim player-coach)

Preceded by Position created	Toronto Arenas captain 1917–18	Succeeded by Toronto St. Pats captains Reg Noble
Preceded by Art Ross	Interim Head coach of the Hamilton Tigers; 1923–24	Succeeded by Percy LeSueur
