= George Carey (ice hockey) =

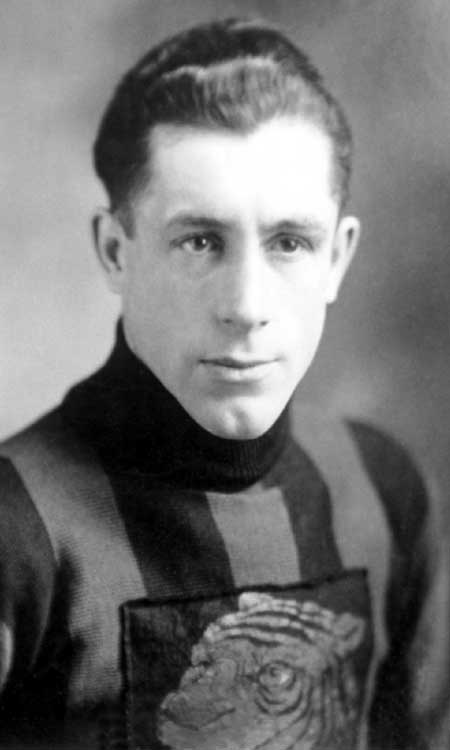
- Born: November 4, 1892 Montreal, Quebec, Canada
- Died: December 31, 1974 (aged 82) Toronto, Ontario, Canada
- Height: 5 ft 6 in (168 cm)
- Weight: 140 lb (64 kg; 10 st 0 lb)
- Position: Right wing
- Shot: Right
- Played for: Quebec Bulldogs; Hamilton Tigers; Toronto St. Pats
- Playing career: 1911–1924

George William Carey (November 4, 1892 – December 31, 1974) was a Canadian ice hockey right winger. He was born in Montreal, Quebec, to Scottish parents. He first played professionally with the Quebec Bulldogs in the National Hockey Association, playing one game for them in the 1911–12 season and winning the Stanley Cup in 1912. He played amateur hockey for several years after that before returning to the Bulldogs in 1916–17, and spent one final season with the team in 1919–20 when they were in the National Hockey League. The team moved and became the Hamilton Tigers in 1920 and Carey spent two seasons and part of a third there, spending a partial season with the Calgary Tigers of the Western Canada Hockey League before one final year in the NHL with the Toronto St. Pats, retiring in 1924. He died in 1974 and was buried at Prospect Cemetery in Toronto.

== Career statistics ==
=== Regular season and playoffs ===
			Regular season					Playoffs
Season	Team	League	GP	G	A	Pts	PIM	GP	G	A	Pts	PIM
1911–12	Quebec Crescents	QCHL	—	—	—	—	—	—	—	—	—	—
1911–12	Quebec Bulldogs	NHA	1	0	0	0	0	—	—	—	—	—
1912–13	Shawinigan Seniors	IPAHU	6	3	0	3	3	—	—	—	—	—
1913–14	Quebec St. Pats	IPAHU	7	7	0	7	—	—	—	—	—	—
1914–15	Quebec YMCA	QCHL	9	16	0	16	—	—	—	—	—	—
1915–16	Quebec Sons of Ireland	QCHL	8	17	0	17	—	2	6	0	6	—
1916–17	Quebec Bulldogs	NHA	19	8	13	21	11	—	—	—	—	—
1919–20	Quebec Bulldogs	NHL	20	11	9	20	6	—	—	—	—	—
1920–21	Hamilton Tigers	NHL	20	6	1	7	8	—	—	—	—	—
1921–22	Hamilton Tigers	NHL	23	3	2	5	6	—	—	—	—	—
1922–23	Hamilton Tigers	NHL	5	1	0	1	0	—	—	—	—	—
1922–23	Calgary Tigers	WCHL	16	3	4	7	0	—	—	—	—	—
1923–24	Toronto St. Pats	NHL	4	0	0	0	0	—	—	—	—	—
NHA totals			20	8	13	21	11	—	—	—	—	—
NHL totals			72	21	12	33	20	—	—	—	—	—
