= Bert Corbeau =

Canadian ice hockey player

- Born: February 9, 1894 Penetanguishene, Ontario, Canada
- Died: September 21, 1942 (aged 48) Georgian Bay, Ontario, Canada
- Height: 5 ft 11 in (180 cm)
- Weight: 200 lb (91 kg; 14 st 4 lb)
- Position: Defence
- Shot: Right
- Played for: NHL; Montreal Canadiens; Hamilton Tigers; Toronto St. Pats; Toronto Maple Leafs
- Playing career: 1914–1927

Bertram Orion "Pig Iron" Corbeau (February 9, 1894 – September 21, 1942) was a Canadian professional ice hockey defenceman who played ten seasons in the National Hockey League for the Montreal Canadiens, Hamilton Tigers, Toronto St. Pats and Toronto Maple Leafs. He was a member of the Canadiens' first Stanley Cup championship team in 1916. His brother Con also played professional ice hockey.

== Playing career ==
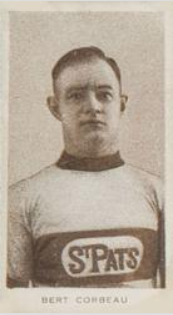
1924-25 card of Bert Corbeau for Toronto St. Pats

Corbeau played junior hockey for the Penetang Hockey Club from 1910 until 1912, when he moved up to the Penetang intermediate team. Corbeau signed as a professional with the Halifax Crescents in 1913, playing one season before signing with the Montreal Canadiens in 1914. Corbeau would be a member of the Canadiens until October 1922 when he was traded to the Hamilton Tigers for cash. In December 1923, he became a member of the Toronto St. Pats as part of a trade. He stayed with the Toronto franchise and was one of the original Toronto Maple Leafs before being waived in October 1927. He then played two seasons in the minor Canadian Professional Hockey League with Toronto Ravinia and the London Panthers before retiring as a player. From 1928 to 1929 he coached the Panthers and then for a decade was an NHL referee. Corbeau then returned to coaching with the Atlantic City Seagulls of the Eastern Hockey League from 1939 to 1942.

Corbeau finally left hockey and returned to Penetanguishene, where he lived and worked as a plant superintendent at the Midland Foundry and Machine Company (supporting Canada in World War II) until his death from a boating accident.

Corbeau was the first player to play for both the Canadiens and the Maple Leafs. In the 1926–27 season, he became the first player to record 100 minutes in penalties in one season. He was posthumously inducted into the Penetanguishene Sports Hall of Fame in 1987.

== Awards and achievements ==
- 1916 Stanley Cup Champion (Montreal)
- 1940–1941 United States National Championships Finals
- 1987 Inducted into the Penetanguishene Sports Hall of Fame

== Death ==
On September 21, 1942, Corbeau died as the result of a boating accident in Georgian Bay. During a party hosted by Corbeau aboard his boat, the boat struck a sand bar. Portholes on the sides of the boat were open and water entered the boat through them, sinking the boat within a matter of minutes. Of the 42 persons aboard, 25 died, including Corbeau.

== Hockey card ==
A collectible hockey card featuring Corbeau from the 1923–24 season is one of the rarest cards in existence. Only a handful were made by a company that featured them in a contest. Contestants who collected a complete set of 40 cards were awarded a pair of skates. The Corbeau card was "short printed" to limit the number of winners.

== Career statistics ==
=== Regular season and playoffs ===
			Regular season					Playoffs
Season	Team	League	GP	G	A	Pts	PIM	GP	G	A	Pts	PIM
1913–14	Halifax Crescents	MPHL	22	5	0	5	31	—	—	—	—	—
1914–15	Montreal Canadiens	NHA	18	1	1	2	35	—	—	—	—	—
1915–16	Montreal Canadiens	NHA	23	7	0	7	134	—	—	—	—	—
1916–17	Montreal Canadiens	NHA	18	7	5	12	87	2	2	0	2	0
1917–18	Montreal Canadiens	NHL	21	8	8	16	41	2	1	1	2	11
1918–19	Montreal Canadiens	NHL	16	2	3	5	51	5	1	1	2	17
1919–20	Montreal Canadiens	NHL	23	11	6	17	65	—	—	—	—	—
1920–21	Montreal Canadiens	NHL	24	11	2	13	86	—	—	—	—	—
1921–22	Montreal Canadiens	NHL	22	3	7	10	26	—	—	—	—	—
1922–23	Hamilton Tigers	NHL	21	10	4	14	22	—	—	—	—	—
1923–24	Toronto St. Pats	NHL	24	8	6	14	55	—	—	—	—	—
1924–25	Toronto St. Pats	NHL	30	4	6	10	74	2	0	0	0	10
1925–26	Toronto St. Pats	NHL	36	5	5	10	121	—	—	—	—	—
1926–27	Toronto St. Pats/Maple Leafs	NHL	41	1	2	3	88	—	—	—	—	—
1927–28	Toronto Ravinas	Can-Pro	41	5	2	7	112	2	0	0	0	10
1928–29	London Panthers	Can-Pro	9	0	0	0	6	—	—	—	—	—
NHA totals			59	15	6	21	256	2	2	0	2	0
NHL totals			258	63	49	112	629	9	2	2	4	38

Source: Hockey Hall of Fame

Preceded by John Ross Roach	Toronto St. Pats / Toronto Maple Leafs captain 1925–27	Succeeded by Hap Day
