= 1923–24 NHL season =

Professional ice hockey league season

- League: National Hockey League
- Sport: Ice hockey
- Duration: December 15, 1923 – March 11, 1924
- Games: 24
- Teams: 4

Regular season
- Season champions: Ottawa Senators
- Season MVP: Frank Nighbor (Senators)
- Top scorer: Cy Denneny (Senators)

O'Brien Cup
- Champions: Montreal Canadiens
- Runners-up: Ottawa Senators

NHL seasons
- ← 1922–23 1924–25 →

The 1923–24 NHL season was the seventh season of the National Hockey League. Four teams each played 24 games. The league champions were the Montreal Canadiens, who defeated the first-place Ottawa Senators in the league playoff. The Canadiens then defeated the Calgary Tigers of the Western Canada Hockey League (WCHL) and Vancouver Maroons of the Pacific Coast Hockey Association (PCHA) to win their second Stanley Cup championship.

== League business ==
At the NHL meeting of February 9, 1924, the NHL discussed plans for expansion into the United States. The same meeting saw the introduction of the new Hart Trophy, to be awarded to the player judged most valuable to his team.

After the suspensions of their own players by the Canadiens, in 1922–23. the NHL decided to take a further role in discipline, as it redefined match fouls, changed fines and adds presidential review for possible further punishment.

== Arena changes ==
The Ottawa Senators moved from The Arena to the Ottawa Auditorium.

== Regular season ==
A newcomer that would become the NHL's first drawing card, Howie Morenz, started his career with the Montreal Canadiens this year. Morenz scored the first goal of his career on December 27, 1923, in the inaugural NHL game at the new Ottawa Auditorium. It was the first of a career 270 goals.

The Hamilton Tigers added Billy Burch and the Green brothers, Shorty and Redvers (nicknamed Red) and now they had a team that could compete nicely with the rest of the league. On December 28, Shorty Green scored at 12:22 of overtime to give Hamilton its first ever road victory over the Ottawa Senators in Ottawa. However, the changes did not pay off this season. The Hamilton Tigers finished last for the fifth season in a row (counting one season as the Quebec Athletics).

The NHL held a mid-season meeting to consider Sprague Cleghorn's suspension. Ottawa claimed he was deliberately injuring opponents, citing a spearing incident against Cy Denneny. The league rejected the charges, and in a game against Ottawa shortly thereafter, Cleghorn charged Lionel Hitchman into the boards and earned a one-game suspension.

A game between Ottawa and the Canadiens was postponed due to a bizarre incident near the end of the season. On their way to Montreal, the Ottawa's train got snowbound near Hawkesbury, Ontario. The team was stuck all night and so Cy Denneny decided to scrounge around for some food, and somehow fell down a well. He was not injured. The game was postponed until the next night and Georges Vezina shut out the Senators 3–0.

=== Final standings ===
National Hockey League
	GP	W	L	T	Pts	GF	GA
**Ottawa Senators**	24	16	8	0	32	74	54
**Montreal Canadiens**	24	13	11	0	26	59	48
Toronto St. Patricks	24	10	14	0	20	59	85
Hamilton Tigers	24	9	15	0	18	63	68

Note: W = Wins, L = Losses, T = Ties, GF = Goals For, GA = Goals Against, Pts = Points
Teams that qualified for the playoffs are highlighted in bold.

== Playoffs ==
This was the last season that three leagues competed for the Stanley Cup as, after the season, the PCHA folded. Two of its teams, the Vancouver Maroons and Victoria Cougars, joined the WCHL for the 1924–25 WCHL season.

=== NHL Championship ===
In the O'Brien Cup playoffs, the second-place Montreal Canadiens upset the regular-season champion Ottawa Senators in a two-game total-goals series for the NHL Championship. Early in the 1925–26 season, when they were given placeholder possession of the new Prince of Wales Trophy – which duplicated the O'Brien Cup as an award for the NHL playoff championship – the Canadiens retroactively engraved this 1924 championship on the new trophy.

March 8	Ottawa Senators	0–1	Montreal Canadiens	Mount Royal Arena	Recap
No scoring		First period	No scoring
No scoring		Second period	5:00 - Howie Morenz (1)
No scoring		Third period	No scoring
Clint Benedict		Goalie stats	Georges Vezina

March 11	Montreal Canadiens	4–2	Ottawa Senators	Ottawa Auditorium	Recap
Howie Morenz (2) - 12:20		First period	13:20 - Cy Denneny (1)
Howie Morenz (3) - 3:30; Aurele Joliat (1) - 6:30; Billy Boucher (1) - 18:05		Second period	10:25 - pp - Cy Denneny (2)
No scoring		Third period	No scoring
Georges Vezina		Goalie stats	Clint Benedict

Montreal won the series on total goals 5-2

=== Stanley Cup playoffs ===
The second place Vancouver Maroons of the PCHA once again faced the first place Seattle Metropolitans and once again, Vancouver would come out on top winning the PCHA league championship. Meanwhile, in the Western Canada Hockey League, the Calgary Tigers won the regular season and the playoffs. The Canadiens owner, Leo Dandurand, wanted Calgary and Vancouver to face off against each other and then have the Canadiens play the winner for the Stanley Cup. Frank Patrick, the president of the PCHA, refused to go along with that idea.

==== Semi-final ====
Since Leo Dandurand's request to have Vancouver and Calgary face off first was denied, the first round match-up was the Montreal Canadiens and Vancouver Maroons. The Canadiens swept the best-of-three series two games to none. Game one was played under eastern rules. Game two was played under western rules.

March 18	Vancouver Maroons	2–3	Montreal Canadiens	Mount Royal Arena	Recap
Helge Bostrom (1) - 5:10		First period	No scoring
No scoring		Second period	1:00 - Sprague Cleghorn (1); 18:00 - Aurele Joliat (2)
Joe Matte (1) - 7:00		Third period	8:00 - Billy Boucher (2)
Hugh Lehman		Goalie stats	Georges Vezina

March 20	Vancouver Maroons	1–2	Montreal Canadiens	Mount Royal Arena	Recap
No scoring		First period	No scoring
No scoring		Second period	No scoring
Frank Boucher (1) - 15:00		Third period	5:00 - Billy Boucher (3); 14:00 - Billy Boucher (4)
Hugh Lehman		Goalie stats	Georges Vezina

Montreal won the series 2-0

==== Finals ====
After sweeping Vancouver, Montreal's next opponent was the Calgary Tigers. Montreal swept them too in a best-of-three series. Howie Morenz scored a hat trick in game one and another goal in the game two, which was transferred to Ottawa because of the slushy ice at Mount Royal Arena. Morenz was body-checked by Cully Wilson of Calgary and suffered a chipped collarbone. The Canadiens swept all three teams they faced during the playoffs en route to their first Stanley Cup since their 1916 Cup win as a member of the NHA.

March 22	Calgary Tigers	1–6	Montreal Canadiens	Mount Royal Arena	Recap
No scoring		First period	19:10 – Howie Morenz (4)
Herb Gardiner (1) – 19:30		Second period	00:40 – Howie Morenz (5); 11:20 – Billy Boucher (5); 15:55 – Howie Morenz (6)
No scoring		Third period	03:40 – Aurele Joliat (3); 04:50 – Sprague Cleghorn (2)
Charlie Reid		Goalie stats	Georges Vezina

March 25	Calgary Tigers	0–3	Montreal Canadiens	Ottawa Auditorium	Recap
No scoring		First period	04:55 – Howie Morenz (7)
No scoring		Second period	No scoring
No scoring		Third period	03:30 – Billy Boucher (6); 13:50 – Aurele Joliat (4)
Charlie Reid		Goalie stats	Georges Vezina

Montreal won series 2–0

=== Playoff scoring leader ===
Note: GP = Games played; G = Goals; A = Assists; Pts = Points

Player	Team	GP	G	A	Pts
Howie Morenz	Montreal Canadiens	6	7	3	10

== Awards ==
The league introduced its first individual award, the Hart Trophy, to the player judged to be "the most valuable player" to their team.

1923–24 NHL awards
Hart Trophy: (Most valuable player)	Frank Nighbor, Ottawa Senators
O'Brien Cup: (League champion)	Montreal Canadiens
Prince of Wales Trophy: (League champion)	Montreal Canadiens

Note: The Prince of Wales Trophy was not in existence yet in 1924. The 1923–24 Canadiens were engraved onto the trophy in 1925–26.

== Player statistics ==
=== Scoring leaders ===
Note: GP = Games played; G = Goals; A = Assists; Pts = Points

Player	Team	GP	G	A	Pts
Cy Denneny	Ottawa Senators	21	22	2	24
Billy Boucher	Montreal Canadiens	23	16	6	22
Aurel Joliat	Montreal Canadiens	24	15	5	20
Babe Dye	Toronto St. Patricks	19	17	2	19
George Boucher	Ottawa Senators	21	14	5	19
Billy Burch	Hamilton Tigers	24	16	2	18
Jack Adams	Toronto St. Patricks	22	13	3	16
Howie Morenz	Montreal Canadiens	24	13	3	16
King Clancy	Ottawa Senators	24	8	8	16
Reg Noble	Toronto St. Patricks	23	12	3	14

Source: NHL.

=== Leading goaltenders ===
Note: GP = Games Played, GA = Goals Against, SO = Shutouts, GAA = Goals Against Average

Name	Team	GP	Mins	W	L	T	GA	SO	GAA
Georges Vezina	Montreal Canadiens	24	1459	13	11	0	48	3	1.97
Clint Benedict	Ottawa Senators	22	1356	15	7	0	45	3	1.99
Jake Forbes	Hamilton Tigers	24	1483	9	15	0	68	1	2.75
John Ross Roach	Toronto St. Patricks	23	1380	10	13	0	80	1	3.48
Sammy Hebert	Ottawa Senators	2	120	1	1	0	9	0	4.50

Source: NHL

== Coaches ==
- Hamilton Tigers: Percy Lesueur and Ken Randall
- Montreal Canadiens: Leo Dandurand
- Ottawa Senators: Tommy Gorman
- Toronto St. Patricks: Charles Querrie

== Debuts ==
The following is a list of players of note who played their first NHL game in 1923–24 (listed with their first team, asterisk(*) marks debut in playoffs):

- Red Green, Hamilton Tigers
- Shorty Green, Hamilton Tigers
- Howie Morenz, Montreal Canadiens
- Sylvio Mantha, Montreal Canadiens
- Frank Finnigan, Ottawa Senators

== Last games ==
The following is a list of players of note that played their last game in the NHL in 1923–24 (listed with their last team):

- Joe Malone, Montreal Canadiens
- Jack Darragh, Ottawa Senators
- Amos Arbour, Toronto St. Patricks

== Free agency ==
Date	Players	Team
September 30, 1923	Howie Morenz	Montreal Canadiens
December 3, 1923	Sylvio Mantha	Montreal Canadiens
February 21, 1924	Frank Finnigan	Ottawa Senators

== Transactions ==
December 14, 1923	To Toronto St. Patricks Amos Arbour; Bert Corbeau; George Carey	To Hamilton Tigers Ken Randall; Rights to Corbett Denneny cash
December 18, 1923	To Ottawa Senators Leth Graham	To Hamilton Tigers cash
January 16, 1924	To Hamilton Tigers Ganton Scott	To Toronto St. Patricks cash

== See also ==
- List of Stanley Cup champions
- Pacific Coast Hockey Association
- Western Canada Hockey League
- List of pre-NHL seasons
- Ice hockey at the 1924 Winter Olympics
- 1923 in sports
- 1924 in sports
