= Red Green (ice hockey) =

Canadian ice hockey player (1899–1966)

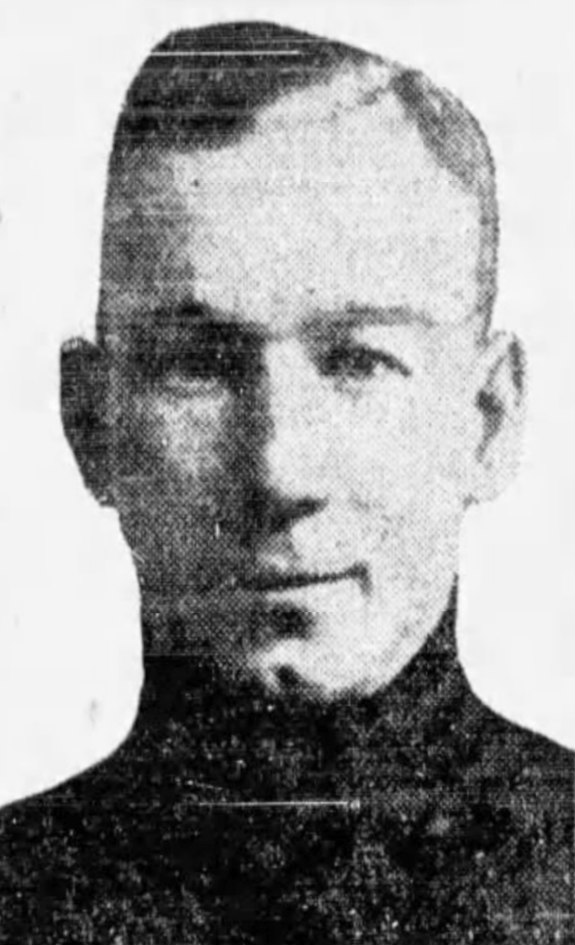
- Born: December 12, 1899 Sudbury, Ontario, Canada
- Died: July 25, 1966 (aged 66)
- Height: 5 ft 8 in (173 cm)
- Weight: 148 lb (67 kg; 10 st 8 lb)
- Position: Left wing
- Shot: Left
- Played for: Hamilton Tigers; New York Americans; Boston Bruins; Detroit Cougars
- Playing career: 1919–1932

Christopher Redvers Green (December 12, 1899 – July 25, 1966) was a Canadian professional ice hockey left winger.

== Career ==
Green played six seasons in the National Hockey League for the Hamilton Tigers, New York Americans and Boston Bruins. He won the Stanley Cup in 1929 with the Boston Bruins. Green was born in Sudbury, Ontario.

== Personal life ==
Green's older brother Shorty Green was also a hockey player in the NHL.

== Career statistics ==
=== Regular season and playoffs ===
			Regular season					Playoffs
Season	Team	League	GP	G	A	Pts	PIM	GP	G	A	Pts	PIM
1917–18	Toronto De La Salle	OHA-Jr.	—	—	—	—	—	—	—	—	—	—
1918–19	Parkdale Canoe Club	OHA-Jr.	—	—	—	—	—	—	—	—	—	—
1919–20	Sudbury Wolves	NOHA	5	15	4	19	2	2	13	3	16	2
1920–21	Port Colborne Sailors	OHA-Sr.	—	—	—	—	—	—	—	—	—	—
1921–22	Sudbury Wolves	NOHA	9	22	9	31	8	—	—	—	—	—
1922–23	Sudbury Wolves	NOHA	7	6	5	11	16	2	1	2	3	4
1923–24	Hamilton Tigers	NHL	23	11	2	13	31	—	—	—	—	—
1924–25	Hamilton Tigers	NHL	30	19	15	34	81	—	—	—	—	—
1925–26	New York Americans	NHL	35	13	4	17	42	—	—	—	—	—
1926–27	New York Americans	NHL	43	10	4	14	53	—	—	—	—	—
1927–28	New York Americans	NHL	40	6	1	7	67	—	—	—	—	—
1928–29	Detroit Cougars	NHL	2	0	0	0	0	—	—	—	—	—
1928–29	Boston Bruins	NHL	22	0	0	0	16	1	0	0	0	0
1928–29	Providence Reds	Can-Am	7	2	1	3	4	—	—	—	—	—
1929–30	Duluth Hornets	AHA	48	14	3	17	81	3	0	0	0	10
1930–31	Duluth Hornets	AHA	42	8	2	10	60	3	0	0	0	0
1931–32	Tulsa Oilers	AHA	2	0	0	0	2	—	—	—	—	—
NHL totals			195	59	26	85	290	1	0	0	0	0

== See also ==
- List of players with 5 or more goals in an NHL game
