= Mount Royal Arena =

Indoor arena in Montreal, Quebec

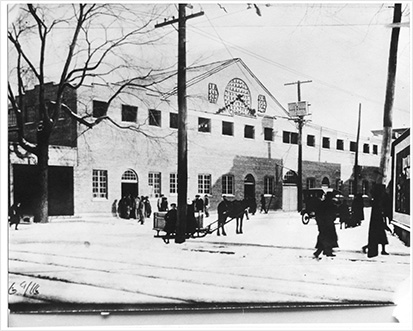
- Interactive map of Mount Royal Arena
- Location: Mount Royal Avenue and St. Urbain Street, Montreal, Quebec
- Coordinates: 45°31′8″N 73°35′12″W
- Owner: Thomas Duggan; George Kennedy
- Capacity: 6,000 (10,000 including standing room)
- Surface: natural ice

Construction
- Groundbreaking: 1919
- Opened: 1920
- Closed: 2000

Tenant
- Montreal Canadiens (1920-26)

The Mount Royal Arena (French: Aréna Mont-Royal) was an indoor arena located in Montreal, Quebec, Canada at the corner of Mount Royal and St. Urbain Street. It was home of the National Hockey League (NHL) Montreal Canadiens from 1920 to 1926, before moving to the then two-year-old Montreal Forum. It had a capacity of 6,000 seated, 10,000 when including standing room. It was a natural ice rink, without machines to freeze the ice mechanically.

It opened, partly unfinished, on January 10, 1920, for a game between the Canadiens and Toronto, won by Montreal 14–7. A week later, parts of a balcony broke before a game with Ottawa, and police stopped sales at 6,500. The rink had been built quickly to house the Canadiens, who had lost their arena, Jubilee Arena, to fire in 1919.

The Canadiens eventually moved from the arena because of its uneven natural ice surface. The team wanted a mechanically frozen ice surface but was never able to get one in the rink, as owner Thomas Duggan concentrated on getting American franchises into the NHL, rather than fulfilling his statements that he would install ice-making equipment in the arena.

After the Canadiens left, the arena was converted into an auditorium and then into a commercial building. While an auditorium, Enrico Caruso sang there, and Norman Bethune, back from Spain in June of 1937, gave an important speech to rally supporters of the Loyalists. On February 29, 2000, it was destroyed by fire. A Maxi supermarket now stands on the arena's former site.

== Sources ==
- Coleman, Charles (1966). The Trail of the Stanley Cup, vol. 1, 1893–1926 inc.
- Mouton, Claude (1987). The Montreal Canadiens. Key Porter Books.

Preceded by Jubilee Arena	Home of the Montreal Canadiens; 1920 – 1926	Succeeded by Montreal Forum
