= Hamilton Tigers (NHL) =

Former ice hockey team in the NHL

- Founded: 1878
- History: Quebec Bulldogs; 1878–1920; Hamilton Tigers; 1920–1925
- Home arena: Barton Street Arena
- City: Hamilton, Ontario
- Team colours: Black, gold, white

The Hamilton Tigers were a professional ice hockey team based in Hamilton, Ontario, that competed in the National Hockey League (NHL) from 1920 to 1925. The Tigers were formed by the sale of the Quebec Bulldogs NHL franchise to Hamilton interests. After years of struggling, the franchise finished first in the league in the 1924–25 NHL season, but a players' strike before the playoffs resulted in the franchise's dissolution. The players' contracts were sold to New York City interests to stock the expansion New York Americans. A namesake amateur team existed prior to and during the NHL team's existence, and a minor league professional team named the Hamilton Tigers existed from 1926 to 1930.

== History ==
The origins of the team go back to the old Quebec Hockey Club team that started play in 1878. Originally an amateur team, it turned professional in 1909. Quebec was a charter member of the NHL in 1917, however, due to financial difficulties, and the NHA-NHL dispute, the franchise was dormant until the 1919–20 season, when it was operated by the Quebec Athletic Club. That season proved to be a dismal one; despite the presence of Joe Malone the club finished with only four wins in 24 games.

After the 1919–20 season, the NHL took back the Quebec franchise and sold the team to the Abso Pure Ice Company of Hamilton, Ontario. The club was moved to Hamilton for the 1920–21 season and renamed the Hamilton Tigers. This was done to prevent the startup of a rival league that was trying to land a club in Hamilton. Hamilton was the fifth-largest city in the country and third-largest in Central Canada with a population of 114,200, and therefore was considered a vital market. Percy Thompson, a part-owner and manager of the Barton Street Arena, became manager of the team. The team became known as the Tigers, a nickname used by a multitude of sports teams in the city. Contemporary newspaper coverage often referred to the senior team of the same name in the OHA as the "Tigers", while the NHL team would either be nameless or simply referred to as "professionals".

The move to Hamilton did not improve the team's record. Despite earning a shutout in their first game, the first team ever to do so, with a 5–0 win over the Montreal Canadiens on December 22, 1920, the Tigers were as noncompetitive as the Bulldogs. As a result, the NHL ordered the other three teams to supply players to the Tigers. Receiving quality players from the other teams was not enough to keep Hamilton out of the league cellar with 6 wins, 18 losses, and no ties in 24 games. Malone, kept out of the first four games for business reasons, scored 30 goals in 20 games.

The next three seasons were just as dreadful as the first. The Tigers finished dead last every year, making a total of 5 straight last place finishes (counting the one season as the Bulldogs). During these years, the Tigers attempted a rebuilding phase to bring the team up to par. After the 1921–22 NHL season, they hired Art Ross as their new coach and made several player changes, even trading superstar Malone to the Montreal Canadiens for Bert Corbeau and Edmond Bouchard. The fans were outraged at seeing Malone leave, but the team was vindicated when he scored a single goal in his lone season with the Canadiens.

Prior to the 1922–23 season, the NHL held its governors meeting at the Royal Connaught Hotel on King Street, the same location where visiting teams routinely stayed when playing the Tigers.

After four years of futility, things started to come together in the 1923–24 NHL season, with Percy LeSueur as the new head coach. Four players were acquired from the Sudbury Wolves of the NOHA: brothers Red and Shorty Green, Alex McKinnon, and Charlie Langlois, who all contributed to a team high of nine wins in 24 games.

=== Players revolt ===
The Globe reporting the players' strike on its edition of March 13, 1925

With yet another new head coach (Jimmy Gardner), the Hamilton Tigers roared off to an impressive 10–4–1 start in the 1924–25 NHL season. Only halfway through the season, they had more wins than any other season in their NHL history. The team slumped somewhat in the second half of the season but still managed to finish first overall with a record of 19 wins, 10 losses, and 1 tie, just ahead of the Toronto St. Patricks. It looked like the franchise would have a chance at winning the Stanley Cup for the first time since winning it as the Bulldogs over a decade prior in 1913.

But it was not to be. During the rail travel back to Hamilton after the season's final game, the Tigers' players went to their general manager, Percy Thompson, and demanded $200 pay for the six extra games they played that season or they would not play in the playoffs. The NHL had increased the number of games played that year from 24 to 30, but the players didn't receive an increase in pay. The Tigers management, stating that the players' contracts stated that the players were under contract from December 1 to March 30, regardless of the number of games, refused to pay the money and passed the issue to the NHL. Thus began the first players' strike in NHL history.

NHL president Frank Calder warned the players that if they sat out the final, they would be suspended and replaced in the final by fourth-place Ottawa. At the same time, Calder ordered that the players' back-pay be held. The impasse continued while second-place Toronto and third-place Montreal played their semifinal, ending with Montreal winning on March 13. On March 14, after consulting with Tigers management, Calder declared the Canadiens league champions and fined the Tigers' players $200. The Canadiens then went on to play the Victoria Cougars for the 1925 Stanley Cup but lost. That marked the last time that an NHL team had lost the Stanley Cup to a rival league.

=== Takeover by New York ===
Thomas Duggan of Montreal, owner of the Mount Royal Arena, held two options for expansion teams in the United States. He sold the first of the two to Boston grocery magnate Charles Adams, who used it to start the Boston Bruins. He sold the second to a New York bootlegger named "Big Bill" Dwyer for a team to play in New York. At the NHL league meeting of April 17, 1925, Dwyer was granted an expansion franchise for New York.

Although Dwyer wished to purchase the Hamilton players, for a little while it seemed that Hamilton might remain in the NHL as Abso-Pure talked about building a new arena. The arena was not built and Dwyer bought the rights to the Tigers' players from Thompson for $75,000. Although Dwyer was ostensibly the owner of the Americans, due to his underworld ties he was not publicly named by the NHL at the meeting announcing the team. Instead, Colonel Hammond of Madison Square Garden, Duggan, and former Ottawa manager Tommy Gorman were announced as the officers. The new team was for a time known as the "New York Hamilton Tigers" by the time it reached training camp, but this was changed to the New York Americans. A Hamilton franchise was still considered to play in the NHL for the 1925–26 season, with a preliminary schedule including such a team, but nothing came of it.

The last active Tigers player was Billy Burch, who retired in 1933.

== Other Hamilton Tigers ice hockey teams ==
=== The OHA Tigers ===
At the time, the city had another Tigers hockey club, fielding teams in the Ontario Hockey Association, the senior team playing in the OHA Senior A League. The senior Tigers wore the same black and gold colours as the NHL Tigers, and were just as popular. When the newspapers reported about "the Tigers" it was usually in reference to the amateurs, while the NHL team was called "the Professionals." The senior Tigers continued into the 1950s, winning the OHA championship in 1919, 1931, 1934, 1942 and 1944–1948. The team won the Allan Cup in 1919 and lost in the 1931 and 1946 finals.

George Redding coached the Tigers in the 1940s, and credited journalist Ivan Miller for originating the "Tattered Tigers" nickname in 1945, referring to old uniforms worn by the team on route to reaching the 1946 Allan Cup finals.

=== Hamilton Tigers (CPHL) ===
In 1926–27, a new Tigers team was formed as an expansion franchise in the minor-pro Canadian Professional Hockey League. This Tigers team, along with the larger teams in the CPHL, broke away in 1929 to form the International Hockey League. In 1930, the Tigers moved to Syracuse, New York to become the Syracuse Stars. This franchise, along with three other IHL teams, merged with the Canadian-American Hockey League to form the International-American Hockey League, forerunner of today's American Hockey League. In 1940, the Stars were sold and transferred to Buffalo, New York to become the Buffalo Bisons, who survived until being displaced by the NHL's Buffalo Sabres in 1970.

== Season-by-season record ==
Note: GP = Games played, W = Wins, L = Losses, T = Ties, Pts = Points, GF = Goals for, GA = Goals against, PIM = Penalties in minutes

Season	GP	W	L	T	Pts	GF	GA	PIM	Finish	Playoffs
Relocated from Quebec
1920–21	24	6	18	0	12	92	132	154	4th in NHL	Did not qualify
1921–22	24	7	17	0	14	88	105	76	4th in NHL	Did not qualify
1922–23	24	6	18	0	12	81	110	182	4th in NHL	Did not qualify
1923–24	24	9	15	0	18	63	68	83	4th in NHL	Did not qualify
1924–25	30	19	10	1	39	90	60	332	1st in NHL	Team suspended
Totals	126	47	78	1	95	414	475	827		

== Hall of Famer players ==
- Billy Burch
- Babe Dye
- Shorty Green
- Joe Malone

== Team coaches ==
- 1920–21 – none (Percy Thompson, owner/manager)
- 1921–22 – none (Joe Malone, player/manager)
- 1922–23 – Art Ross
- 1923–24 – Percy LeSueur
- 1924–25 – Jimmy Gardner

== See also ==
- History of the National Hockey League (1917–1942)
- List of defunct NHL teams
- List of Hamilton Tigers players
