= Chronology of Stanley Cup engravings =

Order in which the Stanley Cup received each of its engravings

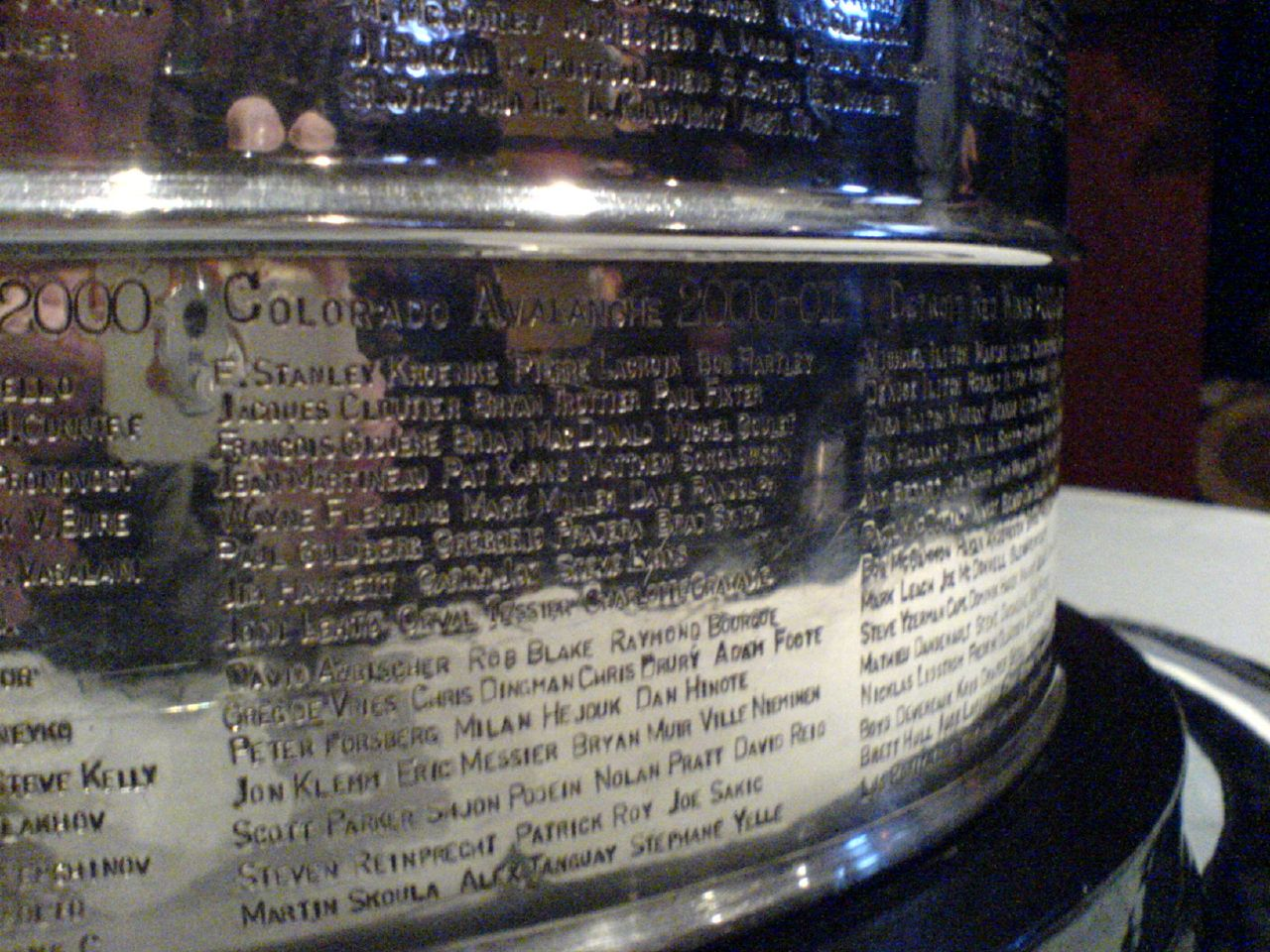
The engraved names of the 2000–01 Stanley Cup champion Colorado Avalanche

This article lists a chronology of Stanley Cup engravings. A unique feature of the Stanley Cup is that, with few exceptions in the past, it is the only trophy in professional sports that has the name of the winning players, coaches, management, and club staff engraved on it, but this has not always been the case as some teams did not engrave their names on the Cup for unknown reasons (which was rectified with a redesign of the Cup in 1948). When he first donated the Cup in 1892, one of Lord Stanley of Preston's original conditions was that each team could, at their own expense, add a ring on the Cup to commemorate their Cup victory (the first year being an exception). Lord Stanley's original trophy was simply a silver bowl minted with the words "Dominion Hockey Challenge Cup" on one side of the outside rim, and "From Stanley of Preston" with his family's coat of arms on the other side. The format and location of the engravings, including the addition and deletion of extra bands and rings attached to the bottom of Lord Stanley's original cup/bowl, has changed through the years. By its 125th anniversary in 2017, the Stanley Cup had had 3,177 names engraved on it, of which 1,331 belong to players.

== Challenge Cup Era ==
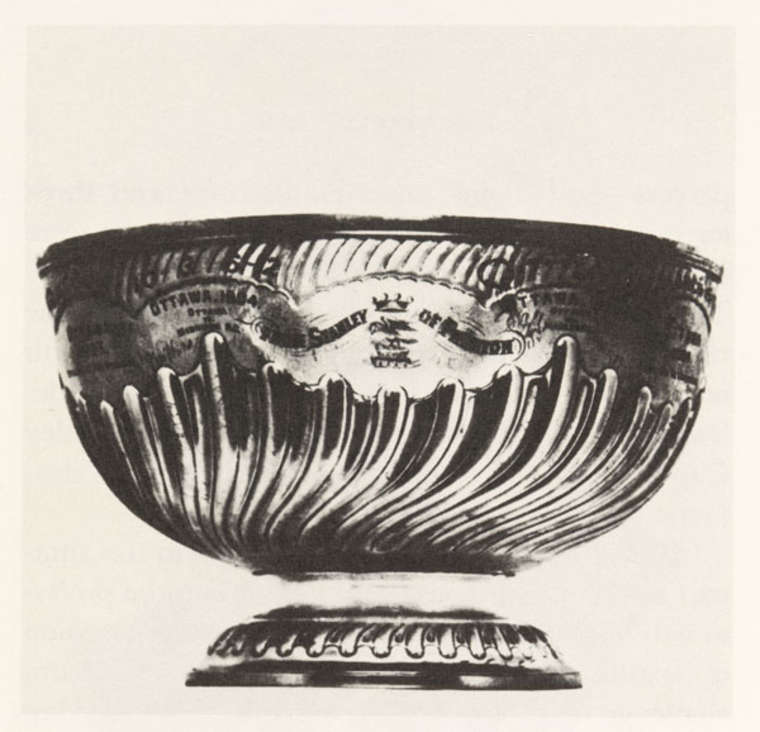
The first Stanley Cup

During the Challenge Cup Era from 1893–1914, the Stanley Cup was a "challenge trophy"; the champions held onto the Cup until they either lost their league title to another club, or a champion from another league issued a formal challenge and subsequently defeated the reigning Cup champion in a special game or series.

Teams had to add their names to the trophy at their own expense. Initially, there was only one ring, the one added by the first Cup champion Montreal HC. Clubs then engraved their team names, usually in the form "[TEAM NAME] [YEAR WON]", on that one ring until it was full in 1902. With no room to engrave their names (perhaps unwilling to pay for a second band to the Cup), teams started leaving their mark on the bowl itself. A second ring was finally added by the Ottawa Senators in 1909. As mentioned earlier in this article, some teams during this era did not engrave their names on the Cup.

Month/Year	Winning team	Engravings Added	Location Added
1893	Montreal HC	"Montreal AAA/1893"	A new base ring that the team attached to the bottom of the original bowl
1894	Montreal HC	"Montreal/ – 1894 – "	1893 base ring
1895	Montreal Victorias	"Victorias/ – of – /Montreal/ – 1895 –"	1893 base ring
February 1896	Winnipeg Victorias	"Victorias/ – of – /Winnipeg/ – 1895 –"	1893 base ring
December 1896	Montreal Victorias	"Victorias/ – of – /Montreal/ – 1896-/ Winnipeg Feb 20th"	1893 base ring
1897	Montreal Victorias	"Victorias/ – of – /Montreal/- 1897 –"	1893 base ring
1898	Montreal Victorias	"Victorias/ – of – /Montreal/- 1898 –"	1893 base ring
February 1899	Montreal Victorias	"Victorias/ –> of <– /Montreal/ – 1899-/ Montreal Feb 15th & 18th"	1893 base ring
March 1899	Montreal Shamrocks	"Shamrocks/ * of * /Montreal/ 1899/ Montreal 4th & 14th March"	1893 base ring
February 1900	Montreal Shamrocks	"Shamrocks/ –> of <– /Montreal/ – 1900 – / Montreal 4th & 14th March"	1893 base ring
March 1900	Montreal Shamrocks	Did not add an engraving	
1901	Winnipeg Victorias	"Victorias/ –> of <– /Winnipeg/ – 1901 – / Montreal Jan 29th & 30th"	1893 base ring
January 1902	Winnipeg Victorias	"Victorias/ –> of <– /Winnipeg/ – 1902 – / Winnipeg Jan 21st & 23rd [sic]"	1893 base ring
March 1902	Montreal HC	"Montreal/ –> 1902 <– / Winnipeg Mar 13th 15th 17th"	1893 base ring
February 1903	Montreal HC	"Montreal/ 1903 / Montreal Jan 29th 30th Feb 2nd 4th"	Outside of bowl
March 7–10, 1903	Ottawa HC	"Ottawa/ * 1903 * / Ottawa vs. Vics."	Outside of bowl
March 12–14, 1903	Ottawa HC	"Ottawa/ 1903. / Ottawa vs. Rat Portage"	Outside of bowl
January 1904	Ottawa HC	"Ottawa. 1904. / Ottawa vs. Winnipeg R.C."	Outside of bowl
February 1904	Ottawa HC	"Ottawa. 1904. / Ottawa vs. Marlboro."	Outside of bowl
March 2, 1904	Ottawa HC	"Ottawa/ 1904. / Ottawa vs. Wanderers."	Outside of bowl
March 9–11, 1904	Ottawa HC	"Ottawa/ 1904. / Ottawa vs. Brandon."	Outside of bowl
January 1905	Ottawa HC	"Ottawa/ 1905. / Ottawa vs. Dawson."	Outside of bowl
March 1905	Ottawa HC	"Ottawa/ 1905. / Ottawa vs. Kenora."	Outside of bowl
February 1906	Ottawa HC	"Ottawa. 1906. / Ottawa vs. Queens. / Ottawa vs. Smiths Falls."	Outside of bowl
March 6–8, 1906	Ottawa HC	"Ottawa. 1906. / Ottawa vs. Queens. / Ottawa vs. Smiths Falls."	Outside of bowl
March 14–17, 1906	Montreal Wanderers	"Montreal March 15–17 Wanderers vs. Ottawa Score 12–10"	Outside of bowl – above Montreal 1902, Ottawa 1903 & 1904
December 1906	Montreal Wanderers	"Montreal December 27–29 Wanderers vs. New Glasgow 10–3 6–2" (mistake score was 7–2 not 6–2)	Outside of bowl – above Ottawa 1904 to 1906
January 1907	Kenora Thistles	"Thistles of Kenora 12 Wanderers 8 / Montreal Jan 17th & 21st 1907"	Inside the rim of the bowl
March 1907	Montreal Wanderers	"Wanderers Defeated Kenora 12 to 8 March 25th 1907", plus players' names and executives (20 names, 5 names missing from Cup.)	Inside of the bowl
January 1908	Montreal Wanderers	Did not add an engraving	
March 10–12, 1908	Montreal Wanderers	Did not add an engraving	
March 14, 1908	Montreal Wanderers	Did not add an engraving	
December 1908	Montreal Wanderers	Did not add an engraving	
1909	Ottawa Senators	"* Ottawa 1909* "	A new base ring that the team attached to the bottom of the 1893 base ring
January 5–7, 1910	Ottawa Senators	"Ottawa/ 1910 / Ottawa vs Galt / Ottawa vs Edmonton"	1909 base ring
January 18–20, 1910	Ottawa Senators	"Ottawa/ 1910 / Ottawa vs Galt / Ottawa vs Edmonton"	1909 base ring
March 1910	Montreal Wanderers	Did not add an engraving	
March 13, 1911	Ottawa Senators	Did not add an engraving	
March 16, 1911	Ottawa Senators	Did not add an engraving	
1912	Quebec Bulldogs	"Quebec / *1911–1912* / Defeated Moncton / 9–2 & 8–0"	1909 base ring
1913	Quebec Bulldogs	"Quebec / 1912–1913 / Defeated Sydney / 14–3 & 6–2"	1909 base ring
1914	Toronto Blueshirts	"Torontos / 1913–14 / Defeated Victorias B.C. / 3 Straight Games"	1909 base ring

(*) Note: The Winnipeg Victorias engraved "1895" instead of "1896" because they won their Stanley Cup Challenge against Montreal prior to the end of the 1896 season.

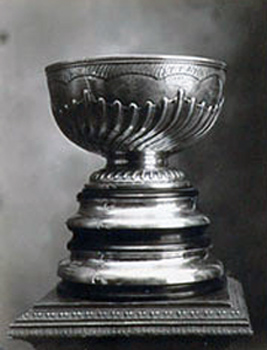
The Stanley Cup in 1921, featuring the original 1893 bowl and two base rings that were each attached in 1893 and 1909

== The "World Series" Era ==
Before the 1914–15 season, a new agreement was reached in which the respective champions of the NHA and the Pacific Coast Hockey Association would face each other for the Cup, similar to baseball's World Series played between the American League and National League champions.

This agreement effectively ended the Challenge Cup rule in which a new champion was crowned after it won the title of the previous champion's league. However, the 1915 Ottawa Senators, the 1916 Portland Rosebuds, and the 1918 Vancouver Millionaires all engraved their names on the Cup even though they did not officially win it under the new system.

The NHA dissolved in 1917, and the National Hockey League (NHL) took its place. Then after the Western Canada Hockey League (WCHL) was born in 1921, it was agreed that all three league champions would play for the Cup. The PCHA and the WCHL later merged to form the Western Hockey League (WHL) in 1924.

† – Engraved their name on the Cup despite only winning the league title of the previous champion.

Season	Winning team	Engravings Added	Location Added
1914–15	Ottawa Senators†	"Ottawa / NHA Champions / 1914–15"	1909 base ring
1914–15	Vancouver Millionaires	"Vancouver, B.C. / 1914–15 / Defeated Ottawa / 3 Straight Games"	1909 base ring
1914–15	Vancouver Millionaires	Vancouver 8 of 10 players' names, plus playing-manager (2 players missing)	Along the fluted sides of the inside of the bowl
1915–16	Portland Rosebuds†	"Portland Ore. / PCHA Champions / 1915–16"	1909 base ring
1915–16	Montreal Canadiens	"Canadian [sic] / NHA & World's Champions / Defeated Portland / 1915–16"	1909 base ring
1916–17	Seattle Metropolitans	"Seattle / World's Champions / Defeated Canadians [sic] / 1917"	1909 base ring
1917–18	Vancouver Millionaires†	"Vancouver / Defeated Seattle / 1917–18 / Score 1–0"	1909 base ring
1917–18	Torontos	Did not add an engraving	
1918–19	Not awarded due to the flu epidemic.		
1919–20	Ottawa Senators	Did not add an engraving	
1920–21	Ottawa Senators	Did not add an engraving	
1921–22	Toronto St. Patricks	Did not add an engraving	
1922–23	Ottawa Senators	Did not add an engraving	
1923–24	Montreal Canadiens	"Canadiens of Montreal / World's Champions / Defeated / Ottawa Vancouver Calgary / Two Straight Games Each", 21 members names. (1 player who did not play in the playoff, left off.)	A new band that is added between the two base rings
1924–25	Victoria Cougars	Won / By / 'Cougars' Victoria, B.C. 1925"- 12 names added to Cup first initial and last name (trainer missing)	A new angled ring added between the bowl and the 1893 base ring
1925–26	Montreal Maroons	"Won / By Montreal 'Maroons' 1925–26", plus 18 members names. (3 players who did not play in playoffs left off.)	A new ring was added between the bowl and Victoria's 1925 ring;

== The NHL takes over the Cup, and the "Stovepipe" ==
The 1927–1947 "Stovepipe" Stanley Cup

The WHL folded before the 1926–27 season began. As a result, the Cup has since been awarded to the annual NHL champions.

Once the Cup became, effectively, the NHL championship trophy, the engraving of the Cup winner's information became a consistent annual tradition. This means that no Cup winning team has been missed since the 1922–23 Ottawa Senators chose to leave their name off the Cup.

Originally, a new band was added almost every year, causing the Cup to grow in size. Thus, it became commonly referred to as the "Stovepipe Cup" because of its resemblance to the exhaust pipe of a stove. It was also occasionally called the "cigar" Cup or the "elephant's leg" Cup for similar reasons.

Season	Winning team	Engravings Added	Location Added
1926–27	Ottawa Senators	"Won By / Ottawa Senators / 1926–27", plus 17 names added.	A new ring added between Victoria's 1925 ring and the 1893 base ring
1927–28	New York Rangers	"New York Rangers / 1927–28", plus 19 names and five-game series added (1 player who played in the minors during the playoffs left off.),	A new ring added directly below the Bowl
1928–29	Boston Bruins	"Won By / Boston Bruins / 1928–29", plus most players, President, Manager, Trainer. Originally 16 members' names were added. There was not enough room to include every winning member (5 players later added to a new ring made during the 1957–58 season. Playing-Coach listed twice, while the President and 1 player were left off the newer ring. 3 of 5 players added were not playing for Boston when they won the Cup in 1929.).	The open half of Ottawa's 1927 ring
1929–30	Montreal Canadiens	"World's Champions / Canadiens of Montreal / 1930", 27 names added, plus playoff scores from the team's postseason rounds (1 A. Trainer left off.)	Over the next 10 years, 10 new rings were added to top of the trophy. In 1932–33 New York Rangers added 2 rings, so Chicago did not need to add a ring in 1933–34.
1930–31	Montreal Canadiens	"World's Champions / Canadiens of Montreal / 1931", plus 28 names. (1 player who played in the finals left off. Also left off was 1 player who played in the minors during the playoffs.), and playoff scores from the team's postseason rounds	Over the next 10 years, 10 new rings were added to top of the trophy. In 1932–33 New York Rangers added 2 rings, so Chicago did not need to add a ring in 1933–34.
1931–32	Toronto Maple Leafs	"Toronto Maple Leafs / 1931–32 / World's Champions", full roster, non-players, team mascot, and playoff scores. 5 players were listed by only their last name only. 42 names in all (Conn Smythe listed twice), 17 investors, and the 5 players (who played in the finals) listed by only their last name were left off newer version of Cup made in 1957–58. (Conn Smythe listed once on newer ring.)	Over the next 10 years, 10 new rings were added to top of the trophy. In 1932–33 New York Rangers added 2 rings, so Chicago did not need to add a ring in 1933–34.
1932–33	New York Rangers	"New York Rangers Professional Hockey Club / World's Champions and Winners of the / Stanley Cup – 1932–33". plus 17 names added to the first ring (President and Vice President missing). On the second ring they included the following: "1933 Marked the seventh consecutive/ year in which Lester Patrick/ had piloted the Rangers "to the/ National Hockey League Playoffs", no playoff scores included.	Over the next 10 years, 10 new rings were added to top of the trophy. In 1932–33 New York Rangers added 2 rings, so Chicago did not need to add a ring in 1933–34.
1933–34	Chicago Black Hawks	"Chicago National Hockey Team, Inc. / The Black Hawks / 1933–34", plus 31 names. A spare goalie who never played in the NHL included. No room for playoff scores).	Over the next 10 years, 10 new rings were added to top of the trophy. In 1932–33 New York Rangers added 2 rings, so Chicago did not need to add a ring in 1933–34.
1934–35	Montreal Maroons	"Montreal Professional Hockey Club / Winners / 1934–35", plus 24 names. (including one player who had been loaned to NY Rangers for the rest of the season) no playoff scores are included.	Over the next 10 years, 10 new rings were added to top of the trophy. In 1932–33 New York Rangers added 2 rings, so Chicago did not need to add a ring in 1933–34.
1935–36	Detroit Red Wings	"Detroit Red Wings / 1935–36", plus 21 names, with all players & non-players positions, and playoff scores from each game, including time of the longest NHL playoff game. (A, Trainer's name missing).	Over the next 10 years, 10 new rings were added to top of the trophy. In 1932–33 New York Rangers added 2 rings, so Chicago did not need to add a ring in 1933–34.
1936–37	Detroit Red Wings	"Detroit Red Wings / 1936–37", plus 27 names, with all players & non-players positions, scores from each playoff game (A. Trainer name missing. 2 players later missing from new ring made in 1957–58).	Over the next 10 years, 10 new rings were added to top of the trophy. In 1932–33 New York Rangers added 2 rings, so Chicago did not need to add a ring in 1933–34.
1937–38	Chicago Black Hawks	"Chicago National Hockey Team, Inc. / The Black Hawks / 1937–38", plus 23 names and playoff scores from the team's postseason rounds added (2 players who played in the playoff left off). 3 more players and the trainer left off the new ring made in 1957–58. One name is listed twice on the new ring.)	Over the next 10 years, 10 new rings were added to top of the trophy. In 1932–33 New York Rangers added 2 rings, so Chicago did not need to add a ring in 1933–34.
1938–39	Boston Bruins	"Boston Bruins / 1938–39", plus 24 names, and the last team to include playoff scores from the team's postseason rounds (Trainer's name missing) Every player who played for Boston included on the cup (3 players did not qualify).	Over the next 10 years, 10 new rings were added to top of the trophy. In 1932–33 New York Rangers added 2 rings, so Chicago did not need to add a ring in 1933–34.
1939–40	New York Rangers	"The New York Rangers 1939–40", plus 19 names. (Vice President and 1 player (who played in the finals) name missing).	A new, larger ring that is added to the top of the stovepipe
1940–41	Boston Bruins	"Boston Bruins 1940–1 [sic]", plus 21 names. (1 player who did not play in the playoffs left off. Player later added to new ring in 1957–58.)	The 1940 larger ring
1941–42	Toronto Maple Leafs	"Toronto Maple Leafs 1941–2 [sic]" plus 27 names. Goalie's name listed twice on new ring made in 1957–58.	The 1940 larger ring
1942–43	Detroit Red Wings	"Detroit Red Wings 1942–3 [sic]", plus 20 names. (A. Trainer name is missing. 1 player who did not qualify later added to new ring in 1957–58.)	The 1940 larger ring
1943–44	Montreal Canadiens	"Canadiens of Montreal 1943–4 [sic]". plus 20 names. (Both trainers, Vice President/Owner missing. Head Trainer later added to new ring in 1957–58.)	The 1940 larger ring
1944–45	Toronto Maple Leafs	"Toronto Maple Leafs 1944–45", plus 29 names.	The 1940 larger ring
1945–46	Montreal Canadiens	"Canadiens of Montreal 1944–46". plus 23 names. (both trainers & Vice President/Owner missing.)	The 1940 larger ring
1946–47	Toronto Maple Leafs	"Toronto Maple Leafs 1946–47", plus 30 names. (1 player left off new ring by mistake in 1957–58. He played in the finals.)	Engravings were postponed, pending the Cup redesign (see below)

== The 1948 redesign ==
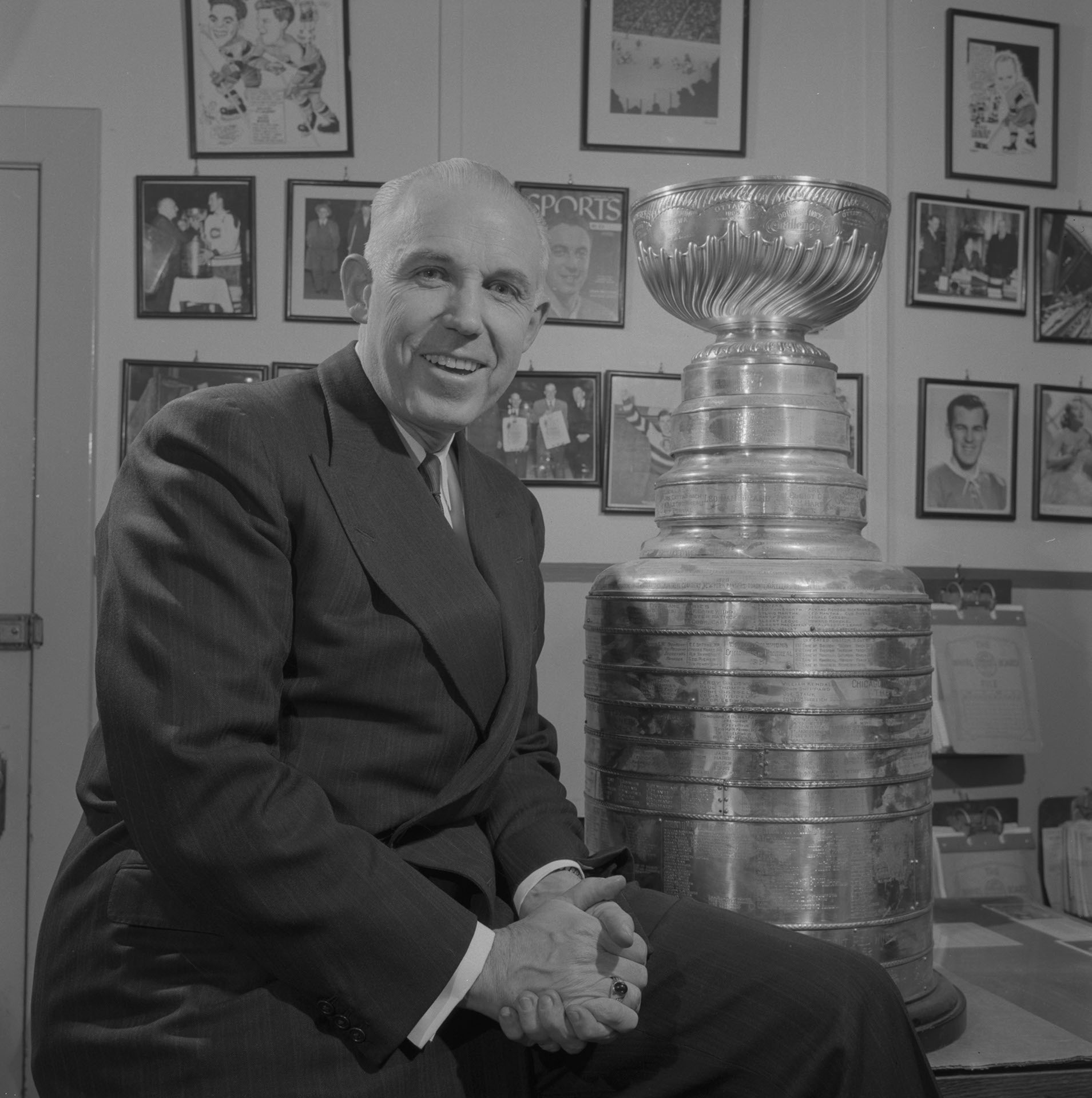
Clarence Campbell, President of National Hockey League, with the Stanley Cup

With the Stovepipe Cup becoming impractical because of its ever-increasing height, the NHL decided to redesign the trophy.

The base of the Stovepipe Cup (all of the bands before the New York Rangers' 1928 ring) was moved back to the top directly under the bowl. A new shoulder collar was added below, onto which only the names of the previous winning teams were engraved. This new shoulder includes all winning team names only. The 1908, 1910 Montreal Wanderers, 1911 Ottawa Senators, 1918 Toronto Arenas, 1922 Toronto St. Pats, 1920, 1921, 1923 Ottawa Senators team names were finally added to the Cup. The cancelled 1919 Stanley Cup Final was also acknowledged with "1919/Montreal Canadiens/Seattle Metropolitans/Series Not Completed". Room was left on the new collar for future teams.

All of the 1927–28 to 1945–46 rings from the Stovepipe Cup were redone into nine bands of various heights that were attached below the new collar, forming a vastly expanded barrel-like body. The first 5 rings and half the sixth ring included the winners 1928, 1930 to 1939. There was room to add one more team the sixth band. The 1956 winner was added later. Underneath that was a replica of the wide 1940 band from the Stovepipe Cup, but expanded to allow room for all winners from 1940 to 1951. The 1946–47 Cup champion Toronto Maple Leafs, who had to wait a year because of the redesign, was also added to the wide band. Finally, two more narrow blank bands were added to the bottom of the trophy for the winners 1952 to 1955.

Season	Winning team	Engravings Added	Location Added
1947–48	Toronto Maple Leafs	"Toronto Maple Leafs 1947–48", plus 33 names.	Band 7 (The wider, expanded band)
1948–49	Toronto Maple Leafs	"Toronto Maple Leafs 1948–49", plus 35 names. (1 player {who played in the finals} and 5 non-playing members left off new ring made in 1957–58.)	Band 7 (The wider, expanded band)
1949–50	Detroit Red Wings	"Detroit Red Wings 1949–50", plus 32 names. (Missing 2 players who qualified were left off. Spare goalie was original included was left off the Cup in 1957–58, because he never played in the NHL.)	Band 7 (The wider, expanded band)
1950–51	Toronto Maple Leafs	"Toronto Maple Leafs 1950–51", plus 37 names. (3 Doctors left off when Cup was redone in 1957–58. 2 players who did not qualify included. One player who played in minors during the playoffs included.)	Band 7 (The wider, expanded band)
1951–52	Detroit Red Wings	"Detroit Red Wings 1951–52". plus 32 names. (including 3 players who did not play for Detroit that season.) (1 player who played 9 games was left off the Cup when it redone in 1957–58. Another players was left off when the replica cup was created in 1992–93, because he never played for Detroit. 1 spare goalie who never played in the NHL is on all 3 rings.)	Band 8 (second from the bottom)
1952–53	Montreal Canadiens	"Canadiens of Montreal 1952–53", plus 29 names added. (Missing 1 player who played in the playoffs.)	Band 8 (second from the bottom)
1953–54	Detroit Red Wings	"Detroit Red Wings 1953–54", plus 30 names added. (1 player {played 47 games} who played in the minors during the playoff missing. 1 player who played only 1 game included one cup. He was left off the other 2 rings, along with 1 A. Trainer.)	Band 9
1954–55	Detroit Red Wings	"Detroit Red Wings 1954–55", plus 26 names added. (1 A. Trainer missing).	Band 9
1955–56	Montreal Canadiens	"Montreal 'Canadiens' 1955–56", plus 27 names added (Spare goalie did not play for Montreal included on the cup.).	Band 6 beside 1938–39 Boston Bruins

== The 1957 redesign ==
As soon as the 1956 Montreal Canadiens added their names to the Cup, all of the various narrow and wide bands of the trophy's barrel were full. Therefore, they were replaced with five symmetrical bands, each of which could contain 13 winning teams. The winning teams and rosters from 1927–28 to 1939–40 were engraved on the first band, the 1940–41 to 1952–53 champions on the second band, and the 1953–54 winners onward on the third band.

Although the bands were originally designed to fill up during the Cup's centennial year, the names of the 1964–65 Montreal Canadiens were engraved over a larger area than allotted (and thus there are 12 teams on that band instead of 13). Also the Cup underwent several minor alterations, namely the retirement of the collar in 1963 and the bowl in 1969 in favor of duplicates because the originals became too brittle.

Unless otherwise noted, all of the following teams also engraved their full rosters on the stated location, and put their club name on the shoulder collar.

Season	Winning team	Engravings Added	Location Added
1956–57	Montreal Canadiens	"Montreal Canadiens 1956–57", plus 26 names. (1 player who played in minors during the playoffs missing.)	Band 3
1957–58	Montreal Canadiens	"Montreal Canadiens 1957–58", plus 29 names. (1 spare goalie who did not play for Montreal included on the cup.)	Band 3
1958–59	Montreal Canadiens	"Montreal Canadiens 1958–59", plus 29 names. (1 goalie who played only 2 games included.)	Band 3
1959–60	Montreal Canadiens	"Montreal Canadiens 1959–60", plus 27 names. (1 goalie who played only 1 game included.)	Band 3
1960–61	Chicago Black Hawks	"Chicago Black Hawks 1960–61", plus 30 names (2 Spare goalies included, but both had yet play an NHL game).	Band 3
1961–62	Toronto Maple Leafs	"Toronto Maple Leafs 1961–62", plus 31 names. (1 player who did not qualify included.)	Band 3
1962–63	Toronto Maple Leafs	"Toronto Maple Leaes [sic] 1962–63", plus 28 names. (1 player who did not qualify included.)	Band 3
1963–64	Toronto Maple Leafs	"Toronto Maple Leafs 1963–64", plus 27 names. (2 who played in the finals, and one player who in played in the minors during the playoffs missing.)	Band 3
1964–65	Montreal Canadiens	"Montreal Canadiens 1964–65"*, plus 32 names. (3 players included who did not qualify included. 1 goalie who did not play for Montreal also on the cup.)	Band 3
1965–66	Montreal Canadiens	"Montreal Canadiens 1965–66", plus 27 names	Band 4
1966–67	Toronto Maple Leafs	"Toronto Maple Leafs 1966–67", plus 29 names. (Missing 1 goalie dressed in finals, and 2 players who played in minors during the playoffs)	Band 4
1967–68	Montreal Canadiens	"Club De Hockey Canadien 1967–68", plus 28 names. (1 spare goalie included who did not play for Montreal.)	Band 4
1968–69	Montreal Canadiens	"Club De Hockey Canadien 1968–69", plus 28 names. (1 player who played in the playoffs left off, plus the Ass't Manager.)	Band 4
1969–70	Boston Bruins	"Boston Bruins 1969–70", plus 36 names (including 3 players who did not play for Boston that season)	Band 4
1970–71	Montreal Canadiens	"Club. De. Hockey. Canadien. 1970.71", plus 31 names. (Missing 2 players who spent the whole season with the team, but did not play in the playoffs left off.)	Band 4
1971–72	Boston Bruins	"Bqstqn [sic] Bruins 1971–72", plus 27 names (Missing 2 players left off played in the semi-finals, but not the finals.)	Band 4
1972–73	Montreal Canadiens	"Club De Hockey Canadien 1972–73", plus 29 names, (Both Ass't Managers left off).	Band 4
1973–74	Philadelphia Flyers	"Philadelphia Flyers 1973–74", plus 31 names. (1 player missing who played in the playoffs)	Band 4
1974–75	Philadelphia Flyers	"Philadelphia Flyers 1974–75". plus 33 names. (Every player engraved on the cup dressed in the playoffs and qualified.)	Band 4
1975–76	Montreal Canadiens	"Club De Hockey Canadien 1975–76", plus 34 names. (Missing 2 players who spent whole season with the team, but did not play in the playoffs and both Asst. Managers left)	Band 4
1976–77	Montreal Canadiens	"Club De Hockey Canadien 1976–77", plus 34 names. (1 player who played in the playoffs left off.)	Band 4
1977–78	Montreal Canadiens	"Club De Hockey Canadien 1977–78", plus 35 names. (One player who did not qualify injured included.)	Band 4
1978–79	Montreal Canadiens	"Club De Hockey Canadien 1978–79", plus 36 names. (1 players who was dressed in playoffs left off. 1 spare goalie dressed in finals, but had not played in the NHL included. Captain did not qualify due to injuries was engraved on cup.)	Band 5
1979–80	New York Islanders	"New York Islanders 1979–80", plus 33 names. (2 players who did not qualify included.)	Band 5
1980–81	New York Islanders	"New York Ilanders [sic] 1980–81", plus 33 names (1 player who did not qualify included.)	Band 5
1981–82	New York Islanders	"New York Islanders 1981–82", plus 31 names.(2 players who did not qualify included.)	Band 5
1982–83	New York Islanders	"New York Islanders 1982–83", plus 31 names. (Every player engraved on the cup played in the playoffs and qualified.)	Band 5
1983–84	Edmonton Oilers	"Edmonton Oilers 1983–84", plus 30 names (3 players who played in the playoffs left off. 1 goalie who was dressed in finals, but did not play left off. 1 name was crossed out, because he was not a member of the winning team; the name was left off Replica Cup in 1993. Team doctor and 5 scouts left off.)	Band 5
1984–85	Edmonton Oilers	"Edmonton Oilers 1984–85", plus 38 names. (Every player engraved on the cup played in the playoffs and qualified.)	Band 5
1985–86	Montreal Canadiens	"Club De Hockey Canadien 1985–86", plus 41 names. (1 player who played in the playoffs 1 Vice President and chairman left off. 2 players who missed most of season injured not included on cup)	Band 5
1986–87	Edmonton Oilers	"Edmonton Oilers 1986–87", plus 40 names. (1 players who played in playoffs left off.)	Band 5
1987–88	Edmonton Oilers	"Edmonton Oilers 1987–88", plus 34 names. (3 players {2 of the players qualified, other played in the playoffs} and 5 scouts left off.)	Band 5
1988–89	Calgary Flames	"Calgary Flames 1988–89", plus 39 names. (2 players who played in the playoffs left off.)	Band 5
1989–90	Edmonton Oilers	"Edmonton Oilers 1989–90", plus 46 names. (2 players left off. 1 played in the playoffs)	Band 5
1990–91	Pittsburgh Penguins	"Pittsburgh Penguins 1990–91", plus 41 members names. (1 goalie dressed in playoffs left off, because he had not played in the NHL. 1 player who did not qualify included.)	Band 5

=== The top ring is retired ===
After the bands were finally all filled, the top band of the large barrel, with the 1927–28 to 1939–40 champions, was taken to the Hockey Hall of Fame, and a new blank band was introduced at the bottom so the size of the Stanley Cup would not grow further.

One year later, the shoulder collar listing the names of the previous winners was also filled to capacity, but it was decided to keep it on the trophy, unchanged in perpetuity. The 1991–92 Pittsburgh Penguins were the last winning team to be engraved on the collar.

Season	Winning team	Engravings Added	Location Added
1991–92	Pittsburgh Penguins	"Pittsburgh Penguins 1991–92", plus 52 names. (2 players who did not qualify included, 1 player who was sent to the minors midseason but later recalled during the playoffs included).	The new bottom band
1992–93	Montreal Canadiens	"Montreal Canadiens 1992–93", plus 41 names. (1 player who did not qualify included, plus 1 player who played in the playoffs missing. 2 Owners, 3 Vice President, and Director of Player Development left off.)	The new bottom band
1993–94	New York Rangers	"New York Rangers 1993–94", plus 44 names (2 players who did not qualify due to injuries included due to protest by the organization)	The new bottom band
1994–95	New Jersey Devils	"New Jersey Devils 1994–95", plus 43 names. Season shortened by 1994–95 NHL lockout. (2 players who did not qualify included.) Rule allowing teams to petition for exemptions to engrave names of players who do not qualify introduced.	The new bottom band
1995–96	Colorado Avalanche	"Colorado Avalanche 1995–96", plus 41 names. (Every player engraved on the cup played in the playoffs and qualified.)	The new bottom band
1996–97	Detroit Red Wings	"Detroit Red Wings 1996–97", plus 52 names. (1 player who did not qualify included.)	The new bottom band
1997–98	Detroit Red Wings	"Detroit Red Wings 1997–98", plus 55 names.(1 player given injury exemptions.)	The new bottom band
1998–99	Dallas Stars	"Dallas Stars 1998–99", plus 47 names added. (2 players who did not qualify included. 2 players who played in the playoffs left off. Video Coach, 2 equipment assistants left off.) Maximum limit of 52 members per year introduced.	The new bottom band
1999–2000	New Jersey Devils	"New Jersey Devils 1999–2000", plus 52 names. (4 players who did not qualify included on the cup, at least 1 regular season player left off).	The new bottom band
2000–01	Colorado Avalanche	"Colorado Avalanche 2000–01", plus 48 names. (1 player who did not qualify included.)	The new bottom band
2001–02	Detroit Red Wings	"Detroit Red Wings 2001–02", plus 52 names. (3 players, 1 played 39 games {whole season with team}, the other 2 players spent most of the season injured, and 1 Asst. Equipment Manager, 1 therapist left off.)	The new bottom band
2002–03	New Jersey Devils	"New Jersey Devils 2002–03", plus 52 names. (one player who played did not qualify included)	The new bottom band
2003–04	Tampa Bay Lightning	"Tampa Bay Lightning 2003–04", plus 52 names added. (3 players who did not qualify included, 1 regular season player's name left off, 1 playoff spare goalie who did not play or dress left off)	The new bottom band

=== A second ring is retired ===
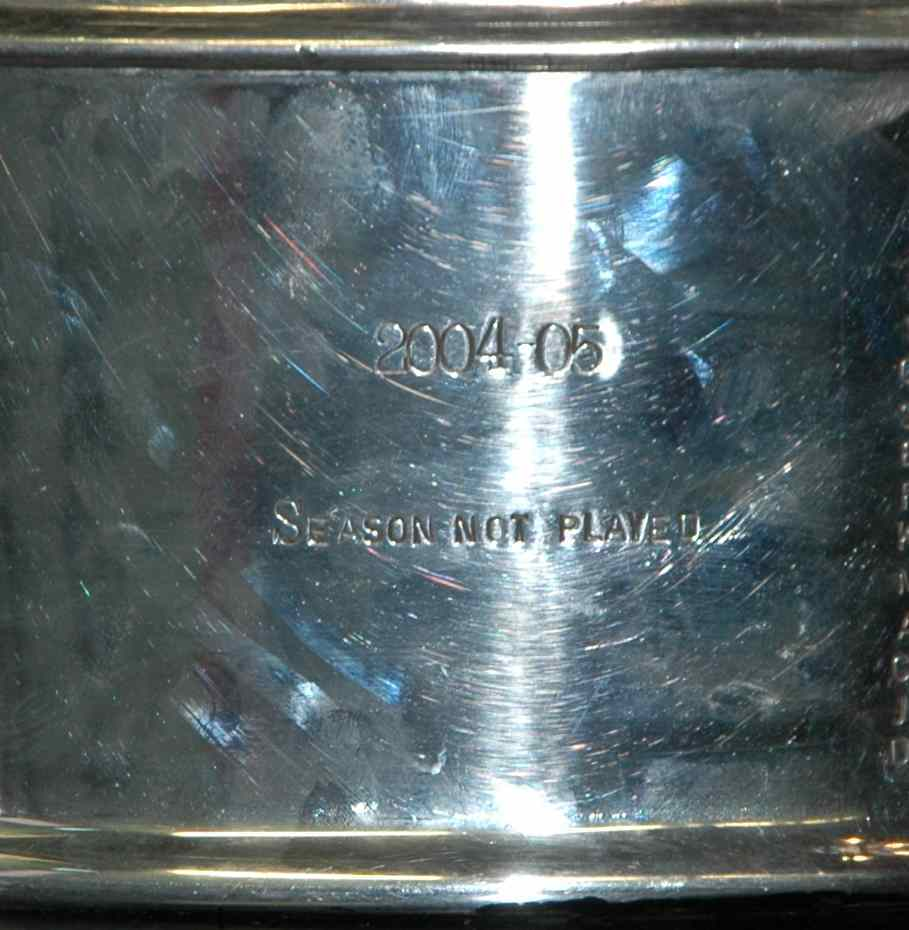
The 2004–05 season's engraving.

The band listing the 1940–41 to 1952–53 Cup winners was scheduled to be retired following the crowning of the 2004–05 champions. However, that season was cancelled because of a labour dispute. The ring was finally taken to the Hockey Hall of Fame one year later after the 2005–06 champion Carolina Hurricanes were crowned. In addition to listing the names of the Hurricanes on the new bottom ring, it was decided to also acknowledge the cancelled 2004–05 season.

Season	Winning team	Engravings Added
2004–05	Not awarded because of 2004–05 NHL lockout.	"2004–05 Season Not Played"
2005–06	Carolina Hurricanes	"Carolina Hurricanes 2005–06", plus 52 names. (2 players who did not qualify included, 2 regular season players' names left off, one playoff spare goalie who did not play or dress left off)
2006–07	Anaheim Ducks	"Anaheim Ducks 2006–07", plus 47 names. (1 player who did not qualify included, 4 regular season players left off {2 of them played in the playoffs})
2007–08	Detroit Red Wings	"Detroit Red Wings 2007–08", plus 52 names. (1 player who did not qualify included, 1 player who played in the playoffs, and 2 therapists left off.)
2008–09	Pittsburgh Penguins	"Pittsburgh Penguins 2008–09", plus 52 names. (1 player given injury exemption).
2009–10	Chicago Blackhawks	"Chicago Blackhawks 2009–10", plus 52 names (1 player who played in playoffs, and another who missed the playoffs injured left off the Stanley Cup. 1 name, the video review coach, was later crossed out in 2021 after he was accused of sexually assaulting players during the team's Cup run.)
2010–11	Boston Bruins	"Boston Bruins 2010–11", plus 52 names (1 player given injury exemption, 1 player who played in playoffs, and another player who played 38 games, 3 other regular-season players, 3 playoff spares who did not play or dress, 1 asst. equipment manager, and video coach left off the Stanley Cup).
2011–12	Los Angeles Kings	"Los Angeles Kings 2011–12", plus 53 names (2 players who did not qualify included, 1 player who played and 39 games and 2 playoffs games left off, 1 player was not given injury exemption, 11 spare playoff players who did not play or dress, 2 trainers left off; Co-owner added by NHL for 1 more name than normal)
2012–13	Chicago Blackhawks	"Chicago Blackhawks 2012–13", plus 52 names (1 player who did not qualify included, 1 goalie who dressed in the playoffs left off). Season shortened by 2012–13 NHL lockout.
2013–14	Los Angeles Kings	"Los Angeles Kings 2013–14", plus 52 names (1 player who did not qualify included; 2 regular season players, 4 playoff spares who did not play or dress, 1 Asst. Equipment Manager, 1 therapist, and many other staff members missing. Co-owner left off at his request)
2014–15	Chicago Blackhawks	"Chicago Blackhawks 2014–15", plus 52 names (2 players who did not qualify included; 1 goalie who dressed for 54 games, played 14 games who did not dress in the playoffs and two asst equipment managers left off).
2015–16	Pittsburgh Penguins	"Pittsburgh Penguins 2015–16", plus 52 names (1 player who did not qualify included. 3 players who played in the playoffs left off. 1 of the players was not given an injury exemption. 1 goalie dressed for 2 playoff games left off for having not played in the NHL.)
2016–17	Pittsburgh Penguins	"Pittsburgh Penguins 2016–17", plus 52 names (1 player who did not qualify included. 1 player who played in the playoffs left off for missing the finals injured. 1 goalie who dressed for 11 playoff games left for not playing in the playoffs)

=== A third ring is retired ===
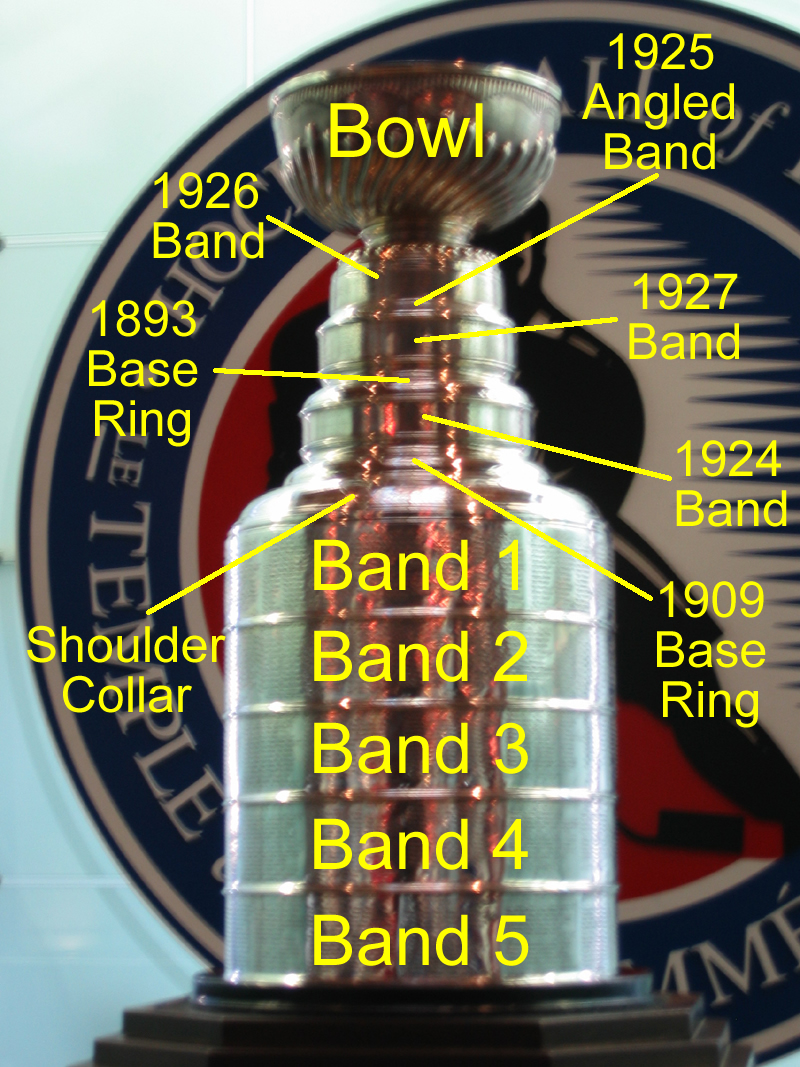
The current rings of the Stanley Cup

The band listing the 1953–54 to 1964–65 Cup winners was retired on October 1, 2018, following the crowning of the 2017–18 champions, the Washington Capitals.

Beginning with the Vegas Golden Knights' victory in 2023, the names of players and staff have been immediately engraved on the cup prior to the traditional summer player's day with the cup. In previous years, the engraving of players and staff of each champion team took place during the preseason of the succeeding NHL season.

Season	Winning team	Engravings Added
2017–18	Washington Capitals	"Washington Capitals 2017–18", plus 52 names (four players who played in the playoffs, one therapist left off. Two Vice-chairmen left off at their request)
2018–19	St. Louis Blues	"St. Louis Blues 2018–19", plus 52 names (one player who did not qualify included; had played 42 games in the regular season with three different teams, including seven with St. Louis)
2019–20	Tampa Bay Lightning	"Tampa Bay Lightning 2019–20", plus 52 names (one playoff spare who did not play or dress left off, despite staying with team in bubble for entire playoff run). Season suspended and shortened due to the COVID-19 pandemic.
2020–21	Tampa Bay Lightning	"Tampa Bay Lightning 2020–21", plus 52 names (one player who missed most of the season injured left off). Season shortened by the COVID-19 pandemic.
2021–22	Colorado Avalanche	"Colorado Avalanche 2021–22", plus 52 names (one player who did not qualify included; one goalie dressed for three playoff games left off for not playing in the playoffs or dressing in the Final)
2022–23	Vegas Golden Knights	"Vegas Golden Knights 2022–23", plus 52 names (four players who did not qualify included; some regular-season players' names left off; all playoff players included, despite otherwise not meeting requirements)
2023–24	Florida Panthers	"Florida Panthers 2023–24", plus 53 names (two players who did not qualify included; some regular-season players' names left off; one executive added under players' names; five members of the training/equipment staff, and Director Amateur Scouting were left off. Team allowed to include 1 more member when usually 52)
2024–25	Florida Panthers	"Florida Panthers 2024–25", plus 52 names (one player who did not qualify included, one regular season player's name left off, one playoff spare goalie who did not play or dress left off, five non-playing members who won cup in 2024 left off so that different members of the team could be included, one suspended executive also left off)
2025–26	Carolina Hurricanes	"Carolina Hurricanes 2025–26", plus 53 names (one player who did not qualify included, one regular season player's name left off, team owner's wife and five children included despite not having formal roles in the organization)
2026–27		
2027–28		
2028–29		
2029–30		
