= Charlie Cotch =

Canadian ice hockey player

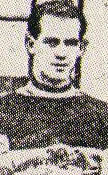
- Cotch at the 1924 Montreal Canadiens training camp (photo courtesy of the Society for International Hockey Research)
- Born: February 21, 1900 Libau, Courland Governorate, Russian Empire (present-day Liepāja, Latvia)
- Died: November 14, 1932 (aged 32) Detroit, Michigan, U.S.
- Height: 5 ft 11 in (180 cm)
- Weight: 175 lb (79 kg; 12 st 7 lb)
- Position: Left wing
- Shot: Left
- Played for: Hamilton Tigers; Toronto St. Patricks
- Playing career: 1921–1925

Charles M. Cotch (February 21, 1900 – November 14, 1932) was a Canadian ice hockey left winger. He played two seasons in the Pacific Coast Hockey Association with the Vancouver Maroons and one season in the National Hockey League with the Hamilton Tigers and Toronto St. Pats between 1922 and 1925. Playing mainly as a spare player, Cotch appeared in 29 games in the PCHA and 12 in the NHL, and played in the 1923 and 1924 Stanley Cup playoffs with the Maroons.

== Playing career ==
After one season with the London Tecumsehs of the senior Ontario Hockey Association Cotch turned professional in 1922 and joined the Vancouver Maroons of the Pacific Coast Hockey Association. In his first season with the Maroons he played 15 games, though did not register a point. The Maroons won the PCHA championship and thus played in the Stanley Cup playoffs against the Ottawa Senators, the champions of the National Hockey League (NHL). The Senators won the series and subsequently defeated the Edmonton Eskimos, champions of the WCHL, for the Stanley Cup. Cotch played two games in the playoffs and did not score.

Re-signed by Vancouver for the 1923–24 season, Cotch scored two goals in fourteen games for them as the team again won the PCHA championship. and reached the Stanley Cup playoffs. They lost their series against the Montreal Canadiens, who defeated the WCHL champion Calgary Tigers for the Cup. Used as a spare player, Cotch was scoreless in the one game he played.

Following his two seasons in Vancouver Cotch was traded to the Canadiens in the NHL in March 1924. He never played for Montreal and was instead traded to the Hamilton Tigers in December of that year. In February 1925, after 7 games with the Tigers, he signed with the Toronto St. Pats and played 5 further games with them. He finished the season with one goal in twelve games and retired from playing after the 1924–25 season.

== Personal life ==
Some sources list Cotch's birthplace as Sarnia, Ontario, though his World War I attestation papers show a stricken out birthplace of Libau, Russian Empire (now Latvia). He died on November 14, 1932.

== Career statistics ==
=== Regular season and playoffs ===
			Regular season					Playoffs
Season	Team	League	GP	G	A	Pts	PIM	GP	G	A	Pts	PIM
1921–22	London Tecumsehs	OHA	—	—	—	—	—	—	—	—	—	—
1922–23	Vancouver Maroons	PCHA	15	0	0	0	0	2	0	0	0	0
1922–23	Vancouver Maroons	St-Cup	—	—	—	—	—	2	0	0	0	0
1923–24	Vancouver Maroons	PCHA	14	2	0	2	4	2	0	0	0	0
1923–24	Vancouver Millionaires	West-P	—	—	—	—	—	3	0	0	0	0
1923–24	Vancouver Maroons	St-Cup	—	—	—	—	—	1	0	0	0	0
1924–25	Hamilton Tigers	NHL	7	1	0	1	0	—	—	—	—	—
1924–25	Toronto St. Pats	NHL	5	0	0	0	0	—	—	—	—	—
PCHA totals			29	2	0	2	4	10	0	0	0	0
NHL totals			12	1	0	1	0	—	—	—	—	—

== Bibliography ==
- Bowlsby, Craig H. (2012), Empire of Ice: The Rise and Fall of the Pacific Coast Hockey Association, 1911–1926, Vancouver: Knights of Winter, ISBN 978-0-9691705-6-3
- Coleman, Charles L. (1964), The Trail of the Stanley Cup, Volume 1: 1893–1926 inc., Dubuque, Iowa: Kendall/Hunt Publishing, ISBN 0-8403-2941-5
- Diamond, Dan, ed. (2002) [2000], Total Hockey: The Official Encyclopedia of the National Hockey League (Second ed.), New York: Total Sports Publishing, ISBN 1-892129-85-X
