= Art Duncan =

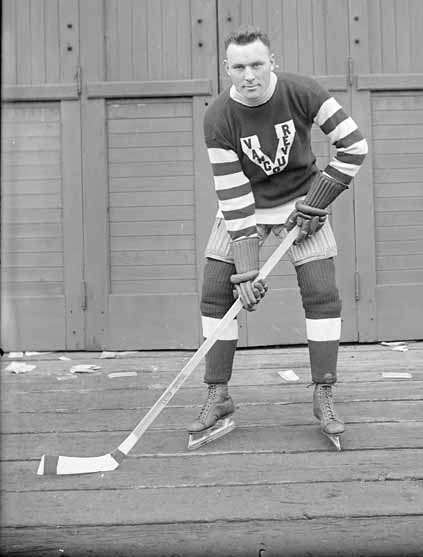
- Art Duncan with the Vancouver Millionaires, 1918–19
- Born: July 4, 1891; Sault Ste. Marie, Ontario, Canada
- Died: April 13, 1975 (aged 83); Aurora, Ontario, Canada
- Occupations: Ice hockey player, coach and executive
Ice hockey career
- Height: 6 ft 1 in (185 cm)
- Weight: 190 lb (86 kg; 13 st 8 lb)
- Position: Defenceman
- Shot: Right
- Played for: Edmonton Eskimos; Vancouver Millionaires; Toronto 228th Battalion; Vancouver Maroons; Calgary Tigers; Detroit Cougars; Toronto Maple Leafs
- Playing career: 1913–1931
- Military career
- Allegiance: Canada
- Branch: Canadian Railway Troops; Royal Flying Corps
- Service years: 1916–1919
- Rank: Captain
- Units: 228th Battalion CEF, No. 60 Squadron RAF
- Awards: Military Cross with Bar

Captain William James Arthur Duncan MC (July 4, 1891 – April 13, 1975) was a Canadian aviator and a professional ice hockey player, coach, and general manager. In 1926 he served as the first team captain, head coach, and general manager of the Detroit Cougars of the National Hockey League (NHL).

He interrupted his sports career to serve in World War I, and became a fighter ace credited with 11 official aerial victories.

== Early life and service ==
Born in Sault Ste. Marie, Ontario, Duncan debuted in professional hockey in the 1915–16 season.

Duncan's October 1, 1916, enlistment papers gave his occupation as accountant. He listed his next of kin as his mother, Mrs. W. A. Duncan. He listed his home address as his mother's place in Toronto. He also claimed to be serving in the 34th Regiment of the militia, which may be the basis for his direct commissioning as an officer.

During the 1916 and 1917 hockey seasons, Duncan continued to play, as his battalion fielded a team in the National Hockey Association both years. His transfer to France cut off his sporting career.

== World War I ==
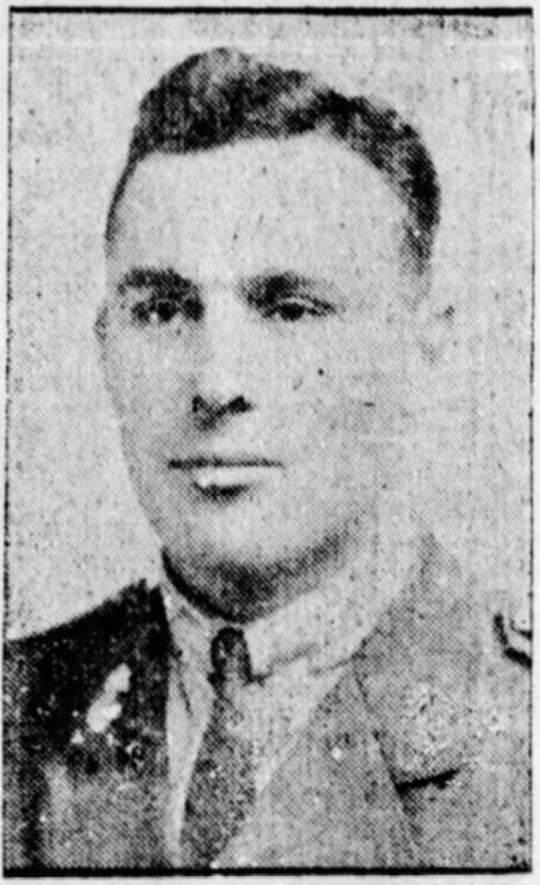
Duncan while with the military.

Duncan first served with the 228th Battalion CEF in France as a lieutenant. On August 1, 1917, Lieutenant W. J. A. Duncan of the Canadian Railway Troops was appointed a Flying Officer in the Royal Flying Corps and seconded for duty with them. He was transferred to the Royal Flying Corps and assigned to 60 Squadron in September 1917 as a Royal Aircraft Factory SE.5a pilot with a roving commission.

Duncan scored his first aerial victory on November 6, 1917, when he destroyed a German DFW reconnaissance plane northeast of Polygon Wood. He began to accumulate wins. On the day the RFC was consolidated into the Royal Air Force, April 1, 1918, he shared his seventh victory with American ace John Griffith. On May 17, 1918, he raised his tally to nine. The next day, he was promoted to temporary captain. He would score twice more after that, destroying an LVG on June 3 and busting a German observation balloon on June 5, 1918. He was returned to Home Establishment on June 30, 1918. A summary of his victories included an enemy observation balloon destroyed, an enemy fighter plane captured, seven enemy planes destroyed (including four shared wins), and two enemy airplanes driven down out of control.

His combat exploits won him the award of the Military Cross, gazetted on July 26, 1918:

For conspicuous gallantry and devotion to duty. On one occasion he attacked and shot down an enemy plane which had been engaged at firing on our infantry. He then led his patrol over the enemy's lines, dived down to an altitude of 100 feet, and attacked large numbers of hostile infantry with machinegun fire, causing the utmost panic amongst them and inflicting heavy casualties. His continuous gallantry and initiative have been most conspicuous.

An award of a Bar to the Military Cross in lieu of a second award followed on September 16, 1918:

For conspicuous gallantry and devotion to duty. This officer sighted fifteen enemy scouts attacking eight of ours and immediately joined in, destroying one enemy aeroplane, which fell with a wing off. He then attacked and drove down three other machines, maintaining the fight until the eight had got back to their lines. He has also, with another officer, destroyed an Albatros scout, which he followed down to a height of 200 feet, in spite of heavy machine-gun fire from the ground.

== Post World War I ==
On March 31, 1919, Duncan resigned his commission upon ceasing to be employed by the Royal Air Force.

He played eight seasons in the Pacific Coast Hockey Association with the Vancouver Millionaires (1915–16; 1918–22) and Vancouver Maroons (1922–25). He played with the Calgary Tigers of the Western Canada Hockey League for one season (1925–26). He also played with the Detroit Cougars (1926–27) and Toronto Maple Leafs (1927–1932) in the National Hockey League. Duncan served as player-coach with both the Cougars and the Maple Leafs.

Duncan died in 1975 in Aurora, Ontario.

== Career statistics ==
			Regular season					Playoffs
Season	Team	League	GP	G	A	Pts	PIM	GP	G	A	Pts	PIM
1913–14	Edmonton Eskimos	ASHL	5	2	0	2	16	3	1	0	1	3
1914–15	Edmonton Albertas	ASHL	3	1	0	1	11	—	—	—	—	—
1915–16	Vancouver Millionaires	PCHA	17	7	4	11	25	—	—	—	—	—
1916–17	Toronto 228th Battalion	NHA	6	3	1	4	6	—	—	—	—	—
1918–19	Vancouver Millionaires	PCHA	17	2	1	3	0	2	0	0	0	0
1919–20	Vancouver Millionaires	PCHA	22	5	9	14	3	2	0	0	0	0
1920–21	Vancouver Millionaires	PCHA	24	3	5	8	6	2	0	3	3	0
1920–21	Vancouver Millionaires	St-Cup	—	—	—	—	—	5	2	1	3	3
1921–22	Vancouver Millionaires	PCHA	24	5	9	14	25	2	0	0	0	0
1921–22	Vancouver Millionaires	West-P	—	—	—	—	—	2	3	0	3	0
1921–22	Vancouver Millionaires	St-Cup	—	—	—	—	—	5	0	1	1	9
1922–23	Vancouver Maroons	PCHA	25	15	6	21	8	2	1	0	1	0
1922–23	Vancouver Maroons	St-Cup	—	—	—	—	—	4	2	2	4	0
1923–24	Vancouver Maroons	PCHA	30	21	10	31	44	2	0	1	1	4
1923–24	Vancouver Maroons	West-P	—	—	—	—	—	3	1	1	2	2
1924–24	Vancouver Maroons	St-Cup	—	—	—	—	—	2	0	0	0	6
1924–25	Vancouver Maroons	WCHL	26	5	5	10	28	—	—	—	—	—
1925–26	Calgary Tigers	WHL	29	9	4	13	30	—	—	—	—	—
1926–27	Detroit Cougars	NHL	34	3	2	5	26	—	—	—	—	—
1927–28	Toronto Maple Leafs	NHL	43	7	5	12	97	—	—	—	—	—
1928–29	Toronto Maple Leafs	NHL	39	4	4	8	53	4	0	0	0	4
1929–30	Toronto Maple Leafs	NHL	38	4	5	9	49	—	—	—	—	—
1930–31	Toronto Maple Leafs	NHL	2	0	0	0	0	1	0	0	0	0
PCHA totals			159	58	44	102	111	12	1	4	5	4
St-Cup totals			—	—	—	—	—	16	4	4	8	18
WCHL/WHL totals			55	14	9	23	58	—	—	—	—	—
NHL totals			156	18	16	34	225	5	0	0	0	4

New title	Detroit Cougars captain 1926–27	Succeeded by Reg Noble
New title	Head coach of the Detroit Cougars; 1926–27	Succeeded by Duke Keats
Preceded by Conn Smythe	Head coach of the Toronto Maple Leafs; 1930–32	Succeeded by Dick Irvin
New title	General Manager of the Detroit Red Wings; 1926–27	Succeeded by Jack Adams
