= Rusty Lynn =

Canadian ice hockey player (1890–1976)

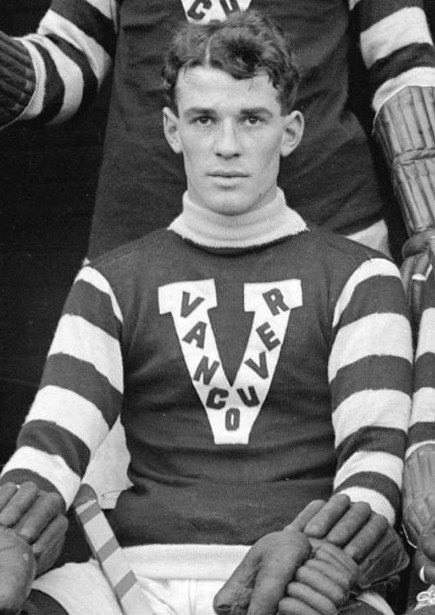
- Lynn with the 1913–14 Vancouver Millionaires
- Born: August 16, 1890; Lobo, Ontario, Canada
- Died: February 7, 1976 (aged 85)
- Height: 5 ft 10 in (178 cm)
- Position: Centre
- Played for: New Westminster Royals
- Playing career: 1908–1922

Russell James Lynn (August 16, 1890 – February 7, 1976) was a Canadian professional ice hockey player. He played with the New Westminster Royals of the Pacific Coast Hockey Association. He was also part of the 1913–14 Vancouver Millionaires but did not see any league action with the club.
