= 1914–15 Vancouver Millionaires season =

Canadian ice hockey team season

1914–15 Vancouver Millionaires
- PCHA league champions
- Stanley Cup champions
- 1914–15 record: 13–4–0
- Home record: 7–2–0
- Road record: 6–2–0
- Goals for: 115
- Goals against: 71

Team information
- Coach: Frank Patrick
- Arena: Denman Arena

Team leaders
- Goals: Mickey MacKay (33)
- Assists: Cyclone Taylor (22)
- Points: Cyclone Taylor (45)
- Penalty minutes: Frank Nighbor (12)

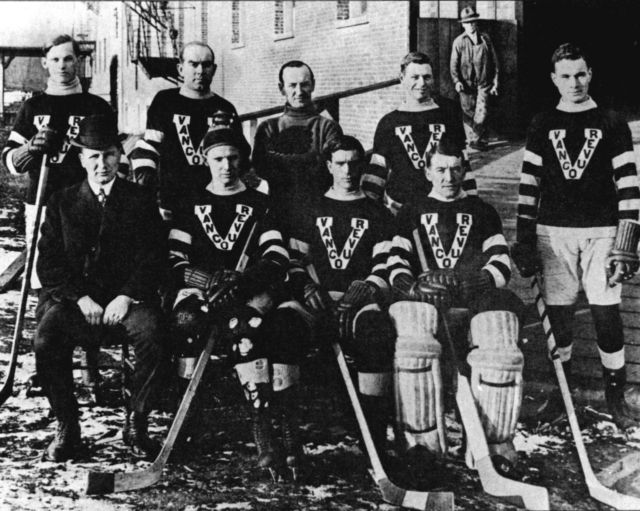
The 1915 Vancouver Millionaires

The 1914–15 Vancouver Millionaires season was the fourth season of the professional men's ice hockey Vancouver Millionaires team of the Pacific Coast Hockey Association league. The Millionaires were the PCHA champions. After the season the club faced off against the Ottawa Senators, NHA champions for the Stanley Cup. The Millionaires won the series to become the first west-coast team to win the Cup. This was the first time that a team from Vancouver won the Stanley Cup.

== Standings ==
Note: W = Wins, L = Losses, T = Ties, GF= Goals For, GA = Goals against

Pacific Coast Hockey Association	GP	W	L	T	GF	GA
Vancouver Millionaires	17	13	4	0	115	71
Portland Rosebuds	18	9	9	0	91	83
Victoria Aristocrats	17	4	13	0	64	116

== Schedule and results ==
=== Regular season ===
1914–15 results: 13–4 (Home: 7–2; Road: 6–2)

December: 4–0 (Home: 2–0; Road: 2–0)
#	Date	Visitor	Score	Home	OT	Record
1	December 8	Vancouver	6–3	Portland		1–0
2	December 11	Victoria	3–5	Vancouver		2–0
3	December 18	Portland	3–6	Vancouver		3–0
4	December 29	Vancouver	4–3	Victoria	OT	4–0

January: 3–3 (Home: 2–1; Road: 1–2)
#	Date	Visitor	Score	Home	OT	Record
5	January 5	Vancouver	4–3	Portland	OT	5–0
6	January 8	Victoria	2–9	Vancouver		6–0
7	January 15	Portland	3–2	Vancouver		6–1
8	January 22	Vancouver	1–4	Victoria		6–2
9	January 26	Vancouver	4–10	Portland		6–3
10	January 29	Victoria	5–12	Vancouver		7–3

February: 5–1 (Home: 3–1; Road: 2–0)
#	Date	Visitor	Score	Home	OT	Record
11	February 5	Portland	8–3	Vancouver		7–4
12	February 12	Vancouver	6–4	Victoria		8–4
13	February 16	Vancouver	5–0	Portland		9–4
14	February 19	Victoria	3–10	Vancouver		10–4
15	February 26	Portland	3–13	Vancouver		11–4
16	February 27	Portland	3–11	Vancouver		12–4

March: 1–0 (Home: 0–0; Road: 1–0)
#	Date	Visitor	Score	Home	OT	Record
17	March 2	Vancouver	14–11	Victoria		13–4
18	March 9	Victoria	Cancelled	Vancouver		13–4

=== Playoffs ===
1915 Stanley Cup

Stanley Cup Finals vs. (NHA) Ottawa Senators: Vancouver won 3–0
#	Date	Visitor	Score	Home	OT	Rules	Record
1	March 22	Ottawa	2–6	Vancouver		PCHA	1–0
2	March 24	Ottawa	3–8	Vancouver		NHA	2–0
3	March 26	Ottawa	3–12	Vancouver		PCHA	3–0

== Player statistics ==
Statistics from regular season games

=== Goaltending averages ===
Name	GP	GA	SO	GAA
Hugh Lehman	17	71	1	4.2

- Lehman led the PCHA in goals against average and shutouts.

=== Scoring leaders ===
Player	GP	G	A	Pts	PIM
Cyclone Taylor	16	23	22	45	9
Mickey MacKay	17	33	11	44	9
Frank Nighbor	17	23	7	30	12

- Taylor led the PCHA in points and assists, and MacKay led the PCHA in goals.

== Vancouver Millionaires 1915 Stanley Cup champions ==
=== Players ===
Centres

Wingers

- Frank Nighbor
- Russell Barney Stanley

Defencemen

- Lloyd Cook
- Silas Griffis (captain)
- Frank Patrick (president/manager/coach/defence)
- Jim Seaborn
- Ken Mallen

Goaltenders

- Hugh Lehman

=== Coaching and administrative staff ===
- None - Defenseman Frank Patrick was owner/president/manager/coach. He ran the whole team.

Taylor, MacKay, Nighbor, Stanley, Griffis, Patrick, and Lehman were all eventually inducted into the Hockey Hall of Fame.

‡ Played Rover, a position between both Defences and behind the Centre

=== Stanley Cup engraving ===
The Senators had the words "Ottawa/NHA Champions/1914–15" engraved on the base of the trophy's original bowl even though they did not win the Stanley Cup Finals. This was similar to the practice prior to the NHA-PCHA agreement when the trophy was officially passed on to the winner of the league championship of the previous Cup champion's league. The previous Cup winner was the 1913–14 NHA champion Toronto Blueshirts.

After the finals, "Vancouver B.C./1914–15/Defeated Ottawa/3 Straight Games" was added to the Cup. Eight players' names and the manager's name were also engraved inside the bowl along the fluted sides.

Two players were left off the Stanley Cup, even though there was room. Kenny Mallen played 14 of 16 regular season games, and two of three games in the final. Mallen's name was left off by mistake. Jean Matz was left off, because he only played one game.

== See also ==
- 1914–15 PCHA season
