= Eddie Jewell =

American ice hockey player

- Born: December 15, 1892 Iron Mountain, Michigan, USA
- Died: December 20, 1960 (aged 68) Spokane, Washington, USA
- Position: Right wing
- Played for: Vancouver Millionaires
- Playing career: 1917–1929

Eldred Jewell (December 15, 1892 – December 20, 1960) was an American-born Canadian professional ice hockey player. He played with the Vancouver Millionaires of the Pacific Coast Hockey Association.
