= 1922 Stanley Cup playoffs =

Ice hockey tournament

- Dates: March 8–March 28, 1922

Final positions
- Champions: Toronto St. Patricks
- Runners-up: Vancouver Millionaires
- Third place: Regina Capitals

The 1922 Stanley Cup playoffs was an ice hockey tournament held at the conclusion of the 1921–22 season. With the debut of the Western Canada Hockey League (WCHL) at the start of the season, it marked the first time that the National Hockey League (NHL), the Pacific Coast Hockey Association (PCHA), and the WCHL all competed for the Stanley Cup. It concluded on March 28 when the National Hockey League (NHL) champion Toronto St. Patricks defeated the Pacific Coast Hockey Association (PCHA) champion Vancouver Millionaires in the final series, three games to two.

== Background ==
=== National Hockey League ===
The 1921–22 NHL season was capped with the 13–10–1 second place Toronto St. Patricks defeating the 14–8–2 first place Ottawa Senators, 5 goals to 4, in the two-game total goals NHL championship series.

=== Pacific Coast Hockey Association ===
After the conclusion for the 1921–22 PCHA regular season, the second place Vancouver Millionaires defeated the first place Seattle Metropolitans in the two-game total-goals PCHA championship series, winning both games by 1–0.

=== Western Canada Hockey League ===
At the conclusion of the WCHL's inaugural season, the Edmonton Eskimos and the Regina Capitals initially ended with identical 14–9–1 records with the sole tie being between the two teams. It was decided to replay the tie game, with Edmonton winning the rematch 11–2 to place first. This pushed Regina down to a second place tie with the Calgary Tigers. The Capitals defeated the Calgary Tigers 2–1 (1–0, 1–1) in a two-game total-goals series to determine second place. The Capitals then went on to beat first place Edmonton 3–2 (1–1, 2–1) in another two-game total-goals series to win the league's first championship.

== Format ==
With the inclusion of the WCHL, the leagues agreed to have the champions of the two Western leagues compete in a two-game total-goals series, with the winner facing the NHL champion in a best-of-five series for the Cup.

== Bracket ==
League semifinals two-game total-goals series
W2	Regina Capitals	1	1	2
W3	Calgary Tigers	0	1	1

League championships two-game total-goals series
P1	Seattle Metropolitans	0	0	0
P2	Vancouver Millionaires	1	1	2
W1	Edmonton Eskimos	1	1	2
W2	Regina Capitals	1	2	3
N1	Ottawa Senators	4	0	4
N2	Toronto St. Patricks	5	0	5

Stanley Cup semifinal two-game total-goals series
PC	Vancouver Millionaires	1	4	5
WC	Regina Capitals	2	0	2

Stanley Cup Final best-of-five series
PC	Vancouver Millionaires	4	1	3	0	1	2
NC	Toronto St. Patricks	3	2*	0	6	5	3

Note: * denotes overtime period(s)

== Semifinals ==
Each contest in this Vancouver-Regina two-game total-goals series was played under different rules. However, the road team prevailed in each match. Game one, played in Vancouver under the PCHA's seven-man rules, saw Dick Irvin score the game-winning goal to give the Capitals a 2–1 victory. Game two was played in Regina under the WCHL's six-man rules, but Millionaires defenceman Art Duncan recorded a hat-trick as he led Vancouver to a 4–0 shutout, and thus clinching the series on March 11 by a combined score of 5–2.

Game-by-Game		Winning team	Score	Losing team	Location
1	March 8	Regina Capitals	2–1	Vancouver Millionaires	Vancouver
2	March 11	Vancouver Millionaires	4–0	Regina Capitals	Regina
Millionaires win two-game total goals series 5 goals to 2

== Stanley Cup Final ==
After Vancouver won Game 1, 4–3, Babe Dye scored 4:50 into overtime of Game 2 to give Toronto a 2–1 win. In Game 3, goaltender Hugh Lehman led the Millionaires to a 3–0 shutout. However, the St. Patricks tied the series in Game 4, 6–0, as John Ross Roach became the first rookie goaltender to record a Stanley Cup shutout. Game 5 belonged to Toronto as Dye scored four goals in a 5–1 victory to win the Stanley Cup.

Dye scored 9 out of the St. Patricks' 16 goals, while Roach averaged 1.80 goals against per game.

March 17	Vancouver Millionaires	4-3	Toronto St. Patricks	Mutual Street Arena	Recap
Jack Adams (1) - 2:30; Jack Adams (2) - 5:30; Mickey MacKay (1) - 14:30		First period	1:07 - Babe Dye (3); 10:30 - Ken Randall (2)
No scoring		Second period	8:00 - Babe Dye (4)
Jack Adams (3) - 16:30		Third period	No scoring
Hugh Lehman		Goalie stats	John Ross Roach

March 21	Vancouver Millionaires	1-2	OT	Toronto St. Patricks	Mutual Street Arena	Recap
Jack Adams (4) - 13:00		First period		No scoring
No scoring		Second period		No scoring
No scoring		Third period		1:45 - Corb Denneny (2)
No scoring		First overtime period		4:50 - Babe Dye (5)
Hugh Lehman		Goalie stats		John Ross Roach

March 23	Vancouver Millionaires	3-0	Toronto St. Patricks	Mutual Street Arena	Recap
Lloyd Cook (1) - 15:00		First period	No scoring
Jack Adams (5) - 4:00		Second period	No scoring
Eddie Oatman (1) - 18:00		Third period	No scoring
Hugh Lehman		Goalie stats	John Ross Roach

March 25	Vancouver Millionaires	0-6	Toronto St. Patricks	Mutual Street Arena	Recap
No scoring		First period	12:00 - Lloyd Andrews (1); 15:00 - Babe Dye (6)
No scoring		Second period	6:00 - Babe Dye (7); 10:00 - Lloyd Andrews (2); 18:00 - Corb Denneny (3)
No scoring		Third period	17:00 - Rod Smylie (1)
Hugh Lehman		Goalie stats	John Ross Roach

March 28	Vancouver Millionaires	1-5	Toronto St. Patricks	Mutual Street Arena	Recap
No scoring		First period	3:00 - Babe Dye (8); 4:20 - Babe Dye (9)
No scoring		Second period	7:00 - Corb Denneny (4)
Jack Adams (6) - 18:15		Third period	1:15 - Babe Dye (10); 8:15 - Babe Dye (11)
Hugh Lehman		Goalie stats	John Ross Roach

Toronto won the series 3-2

== Cup engravings ==
Toronto never did engrave their names on the Cup for their 1922 championship. It was only until the trophy was redesigned in 1948 that the words "1922 Toronto St. Pats." was put onto its then-new collar.

Preceded by 1921 Stanley Cup Final	Stanley Cup Champions	Succeeded by 1923 Stanley Cup playoffs
