= Charlie Reid (ice hockey) =

Canadian ice hockey player

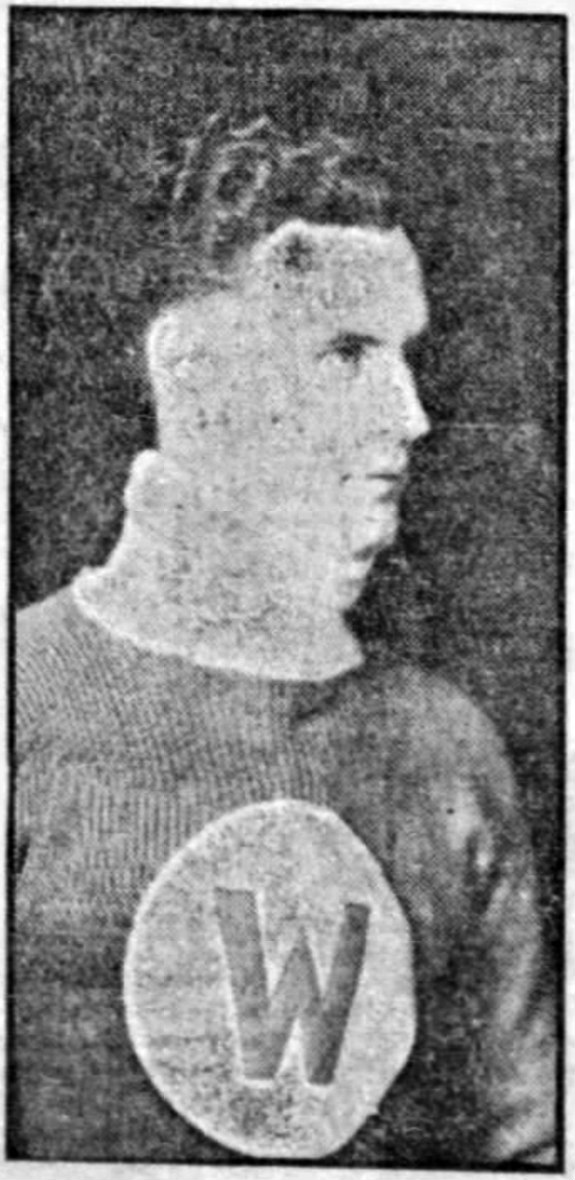
- Reid with the Calgary Wanderers in 1919–20.
- Born: April 14, 1892; Calgary, Northwest Territories, Canada
- Died: November 23, 1953 (aged 61); Spokane, Washington, United States
- Height: 5 ft 11 in (180 cm)
- Weight: 165 lb (75 kg; 11 st 11 lb)
- Position: Goaltender
- Shot: Right
- Played for: Edmonton Eskimos; Calgary Wanderers; Calgary Tigers; Vancouver Maroons
- Playing career: 1910–1932

Charles George Reid (April 14, 1892 – November 23, 1953) was an amateur and professional ice hockey goaltender who played in various professional and amateur leagues, including the Pacific Coast Hockey Association and Western Canada Hockey League. Amongst the teams he played with were the Edmonton Eskimos, Calgary Wanderers, Calgary Tigers and Vancouver Maroons. He was born in Calgary, Alberta.

Charlie Reid appeared with the Calgary Tigers in the 1924 Stanley Cup finals, a best-of-three series the Tigers lost to the Montreal Canadiens of the NHL over two games (1-6, 0-3).
