= 1923 Stanley Cup playoffs =

Ice hockey tournament

- Dates: March 16–March 31, 1923

Final positions
- Champions: Ottawa Senators
- Runner-up: Edmonton Eskimos
- Third place: Vancouver Maroons

The 1923 Stanley Cup playoffs was an ice hockey tournament held at the conclusion of the 1922–23 season. This was the second year that the National Hockey League (NHL) champions, the Pacific Coast Hockey Association (PCHA) champions, and the Western Canada Hockey League (WCHL) champions competed for the Stanley Cup. It began on March 16, 1923, and concluded on March 31 when the NHL champion Ottawa Senators defeated the WCHL champion Edmonton Eskimos in the final series, two games to zero.

Throughout these playoffs, injuries had thinned Ottawa's line-up. But after seeing the gritty show put on by the undermanned Senators, Frank Patrick, the head coach of the PCHA champion Vancouver Maroons, called Ottawa the greatest team he had ever seen.

== Background ==
=== National Hockey League ===
The Ottawa Senators finished first overall in the 1922–23 NHL regular season standings with a 14–9–1 record. They then went on to defeat the 13–9–2 second place Montreal Canadiens in the two-game total-goals NHL championship series, 3 goals to 2, to win the NHL title. Cy Denneny scored the series-clinching goal in Game 2 for the Canadiens.

=== Pacific Coast Hockey Association ===
The Vancouver Maroons finished the 1922–23 PCHA regular season in first place with a 17–12–1 record, then went on to defeat the 16–14 second place Victoria Cougars in the two-game total-goals PCHA championship series by a combined score of 5–3.

=== Western Canada Hockey League ===
The 1922–23 WCHL season ended with the 19–10–1 first place Edmonton Eskimos defeating the 16–14 second place Regina Capitals in the WCHL championship series. Edmonton clinched the WCHL title after Duke Keats scored the series-winning overtime goal in Game 2.

== Format ==
Both rounds of the 1923 Stanley Cup playoffs were played at Denman Street Arena in Vancouver. This year, the NHL and the PCHA champions played in the best-of-five semifinal round, with the winner facing the WCHL champion in the best-of-three Cup Final.

== Semifinals ==
The Ottawa-Vancouver best-of-five series marked the first time in Stanley Cup history that brothers faced each other. In fact, there were two sets of brothers: Cy and Corb Denneny, and George and Frank Boucher. Cy and George played for the Senators, while Corb and Frank skated for the Maroons. A third Boucher brother, Billy, was to have replaced Ottawa's Jack Darragh who was injured, but Frank Patrick, the PCHA president, disallowed Billy from joining the Senators.

Ottawa won the first game 1–0, with Punch Broadbent's winning goal in the third period. Vancouver, led by two goals by Duncan and two by Frank Boucher, took the second game 4–1, which led to more injuries for the Senators. Benedict took a puck in the mouth, Gerard was injured due to a heavy check and Cy Denneny injured his elbow. The Senators again asked if Billy Boucher could join the team, but were again refused by Patrick. In the third game, the Senators lost Gerard to a dislocated shoulder, but won the game 3–2. King Clancy took his place for the fourth game, and the Senators won it 5–1, to win the series. Broadbent ended up leading Ottawa with five goals in the series. After watching the gritty show by the undermanned Senators, Patrick called them the greatest team he had ever seen.

| March 16 | Ottawa Senators | 1-0 | Vancouver Maroons | Denman Arena | Recap |
| No scoring | | First period | No scoring |
| No scoring | | Second period | No scoring |
| Punch Broadbent (1) - 15:00 | | Third period | No scoring |
| Clint Benedict | | Goalie stats | Hugh Lehman |

| March 19 | Ottawa Senators | 1-4 | Vancouver Maroons | Denman Arena | Recap |
| No scoring | | First period | 1:18 - Art Duncan (1); 3:37 - Frank Boucher (1); 14:45 - Frank Boucher (2) |
| No scoring | | Second period | 13:51 - Art Duncan (2) |
| Buck Boucher (1) - 1:58 | | Third period | No scoring |
| Clint Benedict | | Goalie stats | Hugh Lehman |

| March 23 | Ottawa Senators | 3-2 | Vancouver Maroons | Denman Arena | Recap |
| Punch Broadbent (2) - 6:33; Punch Broadbent (3) - 14:35 | | First period | 5:23 - Alf Skinner (1) |
| No scoring | | Second period | 16:47 - Mickey MacKay (1) |
| Frank Nighbor (1) - 2:13 | | Third period | No scoring |
| Clint Benedict | | Goalie stats | Hugh Lehman |

| March 26 | Ottawa Senators | 5-1 | Vancouver Maroons | Denman Arena | Recap |
| Buck Boucher (2) - 7:35; Eddie Gerard (1) - 17:25 | | First period | No scoring |
| Punch Broadbent (4) - 10:07 | | Second period | No scoring |
| King Clancy (1) - 9:15; Punch Broadbent (5) - 19:56 | | Third period | 16:46 - Smokey Harris (1) |
| Clint Benedict | | Goalie stats | Hugh Lehman |

| Ottawa won the series 3-1 |

== Stanley Cup Finals ==
Ottawa swept Edmonton in the best-of-three final series, winning both games by one-goal margins. In the first game, Cy Denneny scored 2:08 into overtime to give the Senators a 2–1 win. Then Punch Broadbent scored the only goal in the second game to give Ottawa a 1–0 victory and the championship.

| March 29 | Ottawa Senators | 2-1 | OT | Edmonton Eskimos | Denman Arena | Recap |
| No scoring | | First period | | No scoring |
| No scoring | | Second period | | 10:05 - John Morrison (1) |
| Lionel Hitchman (1) - 13:04 | | Third period | | No scoring |
| Cy Denneny (3) - 2:08 | | First overtime period | | No scoring |
| Clint Benedict | | Goalie stats | | Hal Winkler |

| March 31 | Ottawa Senators | 1-0 | Edmonton Eskimos | Denman Arena | Recap |
| Punch Broadbent (6) - pp - 11:23 | | First period | No scoring |
| No scoring | | Second period | No scoring |
| No scoring | | Third period | No scoring |
| Clint Benedict | | Goalie stats | Hal Winkler |

| Ottawa won the series 2-0 |

== Cup engravings ==
The Senators never did engrave their names on the Cup for their 1923 championship. It was only until the trophy was redesigned in 1948 that the words "1923 Ottawa Senators" were put onto its then-new collar.

| Preceded by 1922 Stanley Cup playoffs | Stanley Cup Champions | Succeeded by 1924 Stanley Cup playoffs |
