= 1924 Stanley Cup playoffs =

Ice hockey tournament

- Dates: March 18–March 25, 1924

Final positions
- Champions: Montreal Canadiens
- Runners-up: Calgary Tigers
- Third place: Vancouver Maroons

The 1924 Stanley Cup playoffs was an ice hockey tournament held at the conclusion of the 1923–24 season. It was the third and final year that the National Hockey League (NHL) champions, the Pacific Coast Hockey Association (PCHA) champions, and the Western Canada Hockey League (WCHL) champions competed for the Stanley Cup (the PCHA and the WCHL would later merge after the season). The playoffs began on March 18, 1924, and concluded on March 25 when the NHL champion Montreal Canadiens defeated the WCHL champion Calgary Tigers in the final series, two games to zero.

== Background ==
=== National Hockey League ===
The Montreal Canadiens finished second overall in the 1923–24 NHL regular season standings with a 13–11 record, behind the 16–8 Ottawa Senators. The Canadiens then upset the Senators in the two-game total-goals league champion series, 5 goals to 2, to win the NHL title.

=== Pacific Coast Hockey Association ===
The 1923–24 PCHA season was capped with the 13–6–1 Vancouver Maroons defeating the 14–16–1 Seattle Metropolitans in a two-game league championship series.

=== Western Canada Hockey League ===
The Calgary Tigers finished the 1923–24 WCHL regular season with an 18–11–1 record. The Tigers then defeated the 17–11–2 second place Regina Capitals in the WCHL championship series, tying Game 1 in Regina, 2–2, and then winning 2–0 in Calgary.

== Format dispute ==
Both rounds of the Stanley Cup playoffs were originally scheduled to be played on the NHL winner's home ice, with the NHL champion having to face both the PCHA and the WCHL champions. However, Montreal Canadiens owner Leo Dandurand claimed that Calgary and Vancouver were inferior to his. He therefore wanted the two western teams to face off against each other, and then have the Canadiens play the winner in the final round. PCHA President Frank Patrick refused to go along with that idea and instead proposed a compromise in which the host team's (Montreal's) customary contribution towards the two other clubs' travel expenses would be cut in half.

In order to generate the additional money, Calgary and Vancouver decided to play a three-game series before going to Montreal, with the loser having to face the Canadiens in the first round of the Stanley Cup playoffs. Games were played in Vancouver, Calgary, and Winnipeg, with the Tigers coming back from a Game 1 loss to win the next two contests. Despite this extra series between the Tigers and the Maroons, Montreal still had to defeat both western teams in order to win the Cup.

== Bracket ==
League championships two-game total-goals series
N1	Ottawa Senators	2
N2	Montreal Canadiens	5
W1	Calgary Tigers	4
W2	Regina Capitals	2
P1	Seattle Metropolitans	3
P2	Vancouver Maroons	4

PCHA–WCHL play-off best-of-three series
W1	Calgary Tigers	2
P2	Vancouver Maroons	1

Semifinal best-of-three series
N2	Montreal Canadiens	2
P2	Vancouver Maroons	0

Final best-of-three series
N2	Montreal Canadiens	2
W1	Calgary Tigers	0

== Semifinals ==
The Canadiens swept the Maroons in two, one-goal victories in the best-of-three series. Billy Boucher scored the game-winning goal in Montreal's 3–2 victory in the Game 1. In Game 2, Vancouver scored first on a goal by Billy's brother, Frank Boucher. But Billy scored two goals of his own to give the Canadiens a 2–1 win and clinch the series.

March 18	Vancouver Maroons	2–3	Montreal Canadiens	Mount Royal Arena	Recap
Helge Bostrom (1) – 05:10		First period	No scoring
No scoring		Second period	01:00 – Sprague Cleghorn (1); 18:00 - Aurele Joliat (2)
Joe Matte (1) – 07:00		Third period	08:00 – Billy Boucher (2)
Hugh Lehman		Goalie stats	Georges Vezina

March 20	Vancouver Maroons	1–2	Montreal Canadiens	Mount Royal Arena	Recap
No scoring		First period	No scoring
No scoring		Second period	No scoring
Frank Boucher (1) – 15:00		Third period	05:00 – Billy Boucher (3); 14:00 – Billy Boucher (4)
Hugh Lehman		Goalie stats	Georges Vezina

Montreal won series 2–0

== Stanley Cup Finals ==
Montreal also swept Calgary in the best-of-three series to clinch the Cup. In the first game, rookie Howie Morenz recorded a hat-trick as he led the Canadiens to a 6–1 victory. The second game was then moved to the artificial ice at Ottawa Auditorium in Ottawa because of poor ice conditions at Mount Royal Arena. There, goaltender Georges Vézina lead Montreal to a 3–0 shutout to clinch the Cup. Morenz also added another goal in the second contest, but was also leveled by Calgary right wing Cully Wilson and suffered a chipped collarbone. The Canadiens won their first Stanley Cup as a member of the NHL, their second counting the 1916 Cup win.

March 22	Calgary Tigers	1–6	Montreal Canadiens	Mount Royal Arena (Game 2 at Ottawa Auditorium)	Recap
No scoring		First period	19:10 – Howie Morenz (4)
Herb Gardiner (1) – 19:30		Second period	00:40 – Howie Morenz (5); 11:20 – Billy Boucher (5); 15:55 – Howie Morenz (6)
No scoring		Third period	03:40 – Aurele Joliat (3); 04:50 – Sprague Cleghorn (2)
Charlie Reid		Goalie stats	Georges Vezina

March 25	Calgary Tigers	0–3	Montreal Canadiens	Mount Royal Arena (Game 2 at Ottawa Auditorium)	Recap
No scoring		First period	04:55 – Howie Morenz (7)
No scoring		Second period	No scoring
No scoring		Third period	03:30 – Billy Boucher (6); 13:50 – Aurele Joliat (4)
Charlie Reid		Goalie stats	Georges Vezina

Montreal won series 2–0

== Cup engravings ==
After the playoffs, a new ring was added to the Cup with the player's names engraved along with the following: "Canadiens of Montreal / World's Champions / Defeated / Ottawa Vancouver Calgary / Two Straight Games Each"

Preceded by 1923 Stanley Cup playoffs	Stanley Cup Champions	Succeeded by 1925 Stanley Cup playoffs
