= Hughie Lehman =

Canadian ice hockey player (1885–1961)

- Hockey Hall of Fame, 1958
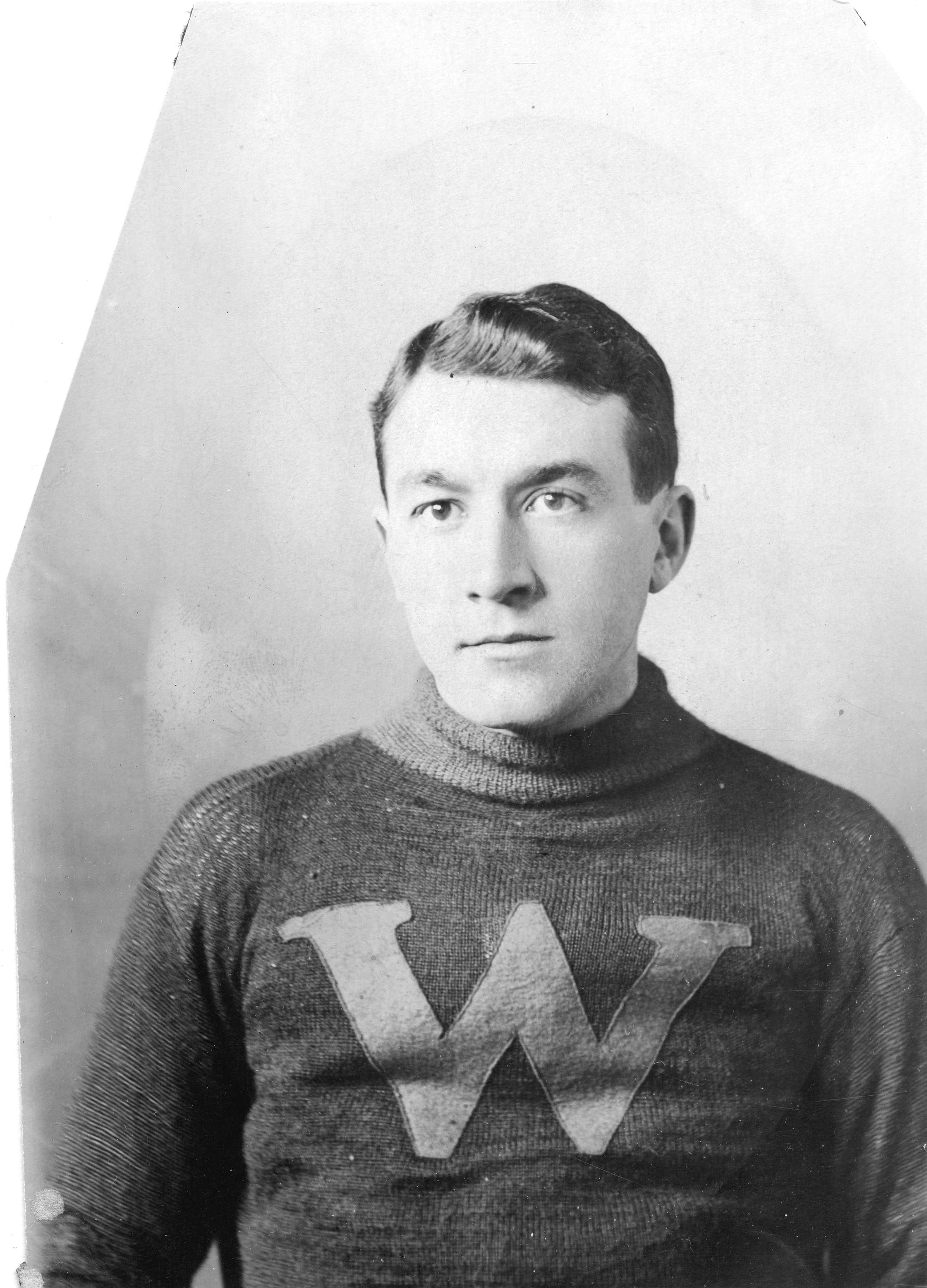
- Lehman with the New Westminster Royals in 1912
- Born: October 27, 1885 Pembroke, Ontario, Canada
- Died: April 12, 1961 (aged 75) Toronto, Ontario, Canada
- Height: 5 ft 8 in (173 cm)
- Weight: 168 lb (76 kg; 12 st 0 lb)
- Position: Goaltender
- Caught: Left
- Played for: Sault Ste. Marie Marlboros; Berlin Dutchmen; Galt Professionals; New Westminster Royals; Vancouver Millionaires; Chicago Black Hawks
- Playing career: 1908–1928

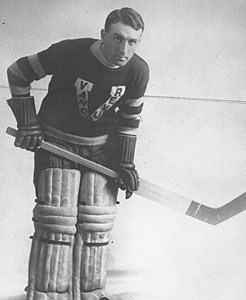
Lehman with the Vancouver Millionaires

Frederick Hugh "Old Eagle Eyes" Lehman (October 27, 1885 – April 12, 1961) was a Canadian professional ice hockey player. A goaltender, he started his ice hockey career playing for the Pembroke Lumber Kings and the Berlin Dutchmen. In 1911, Lehman joined the New Westminster Royals, playing for the Royals for three seasons, before joining the Vancouver Millionaires in 1914. Lehman played half of his 22-year professional career with Vancouver, winning his only Stanley Cup; he would be unsuccessful in seven other attempts. In 1926, he joined the Chicago Black Hawks of the National Hockey League (NHL), playing a full season and splitting the second one as player and head coach. Although some ice hockey historians credit Jacques Plante for originating the practice, Lehman was the first goaltender to regularly pass the puck to his fellow forwards and defensemen; he even scored a goal by shooting the puck in the opponent's net while playing for the Professionals. He was inducted into the Hockey Hall of Fame in 1958.

== Playing career ==
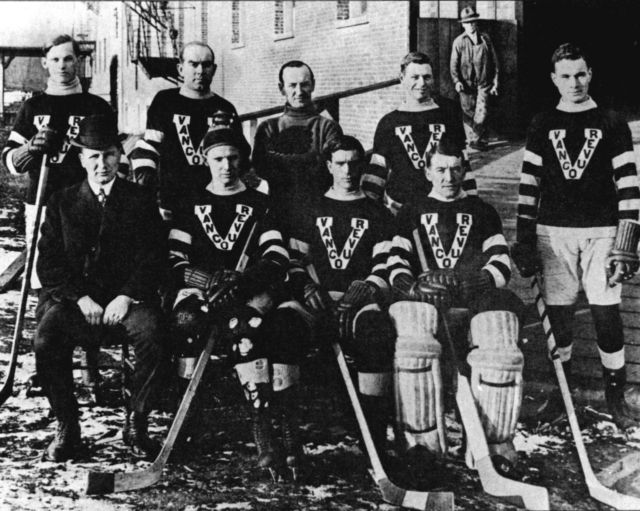
The Vancouver Millionaires in 1914–15, after their Stanley Cup victory; Lehman is seated bottom row, far right.

Lehman began his playing career in 1903–04, playing for the Pembroke Lumber Kings of the Ottawa Valley Hockey League (OVHL) for the first three seasons of his career. In the 1906–07 season, Lehman was signed as a free agent by the Canadian Soo of the International Professional Hockey League (IPHL); the IPHL was the first fully professional ice hockey league. Lehman returned to Pembroke for the 1907–08 season, appearing in four games. For the 1908–09 season, Lehman joined the Berlin Dutchmen of the Ontario Professional Hockey League (OPHL). In the 1909–10 season, Lehman was in two different Stanley Cup playoff series, with two different teams, the Berlin Dutchmen and the Galt Professionals, but he lost both times. During those playoff series, he appeared in three games, giving up 22 goals. Lehman played with the Berlin Dutchmen until 1911.

In 1911–12, Lehman played for the New Westminster Royals of the newly founded Pacific Coast Hockey Association (PCHA). He played three seasons for New Westminster, winning the league championship in his first season. In 1914–15, Lehman joined the Vancouver Millionaires of the PCHA. In his first season with the Millionaires, Lehman posted a 14–3 record, with a 4.08 goals-against average, which was a very good average in an era when goaltenders were not allowed to drop on their knees to make a save. In the Stanley Cup playoffs, Lehman helped the Millionaires become the first PCHA team to win the Stanley Cup, with a 3–0 record and 2.67 goals against average. This would be the only Stanley Cup victory of Lehman's career, as he was on the losing side in seven other attempts. The Millionaires squad consisted of seven future members of the Hockey Hall of Fame when they won the Cup: Lehman, Frank Nighbor, Cyclone Taylor, Si Griffis, Barney Stanley, Frank Patrick, and Mickey MacKay.

Lehman played with the Millionaires until the 1925–26 season. During that time, Lehman and some of his teammates were involved in a humorous incident when going back to Canada after an exhibition game against the Montreal Wanderers in New York City. In New York, Lehman's wife bought numerous women's designer outfits, after being treated to a shopping spree by him. When going back to Canada, Lehman, on the advice of Cyclone Taylor, who was both a professional ice hockey player and a Canadian immigration officer, split up all outfits among his teammates to avoid paying additional taxes he would have had to pay if he had brought all the clothing by himself at once; this puzzled the Customs officers. In 1922–23, the Millionaires were renamed the Maroons, and joined the Western Canada Hockey League (WCHL). The WCHL was renamed to the Western Hockey League in 1925–26; however, the league disbanded at the conclusion of that season. While playing for the Millionaires, Lehman appeared in six Stanley Cup Final series, losing every time, except in his first season, in 1914–15.

Following the collapse of the WHL, Lehman joined the Chicago Black Hawks for the 1926–27 season. While in Chicago, Lehman mentored future Chicago goaltender and captain Charlie Gardiner. Lehman played one full season, and another four games the next one. During the 1926 season, Lehman became the oldest goaltender to win his first NHL game at 41 years 21 days. This record was broken on February 22, 2020 by David Ayres who at 42 years, 194 days came into a game as an emergency backup goaltender for the Carolina Hurricanes against the Toronto Maple Leafs at Scotiabank Arena in the 2nd period and won the game 6-3.

== Coaching career ==
During the 1927–28 season, Black Hawks owner and manager Frederic McLaughlin was sketching some plays for his team; after Lehman was shown the plays by McLaughlin, Lehman responded by calling it "the craziest bunch of junk [he's] ever seen". Expecting to be fired after that outburst, Lehman was later told to go to McLaughlin's office. It was how Lehman's playing career ended: McLaughlin appointed Lehman to be Chicago's new head coach. Lehman coached Chicago for part of one season, finishing with a 3–17–1 record over 21 games. He was replaced by Herb Gardiner the following season.

== Playing style ==
As a goaltender, Lehman was a strong skater and good puckhandler. He chased down loose pucks, and was able to pass the puck to his forwards, surprising the other team's defenders. Playing in the OPHL, Lehman scored a goal by shooting the puck in the opponent's net. The first NHL goaltender to duplicate such a feat was Ron Hextall, who did it in 1987.

== Legacy ==
After retiring from ice hockey, Lehman worked in the road construction business, eventually becoming the president of a paving company. Lehman was inducted into the Hockey Hall of Fame in 1958.

== Career statistics ==
=== Regular season and playoffs ===
			Regular season								Playoffs
Season	Team	League	GP	W	L	T	Min	GA	SO	GAA	GP	W	L	T	Min	GA	SO	GAA
1903–04	Pembroke Lumber Kings	OVHL	5	1	4	0	300	22	0	4.40	—	—	—	—	—	—	—	—
1904–05	Pembroke Lumber Kings	OVHL	—	—	—	—	—	—	—	—	—	—	—	—	—	—	—	—
1905–06	Pembroke Lumber Kings	OVHL	8	8	0	0	480	13	1	1.63	1	1	0	0	60	0	1	0.00
1906–07	Canadian Soo	IPHL	24	13	11	0	1440	123	0	5.13	—	—	—	—	—	—	—	—
1907–08	Pembroke Lumber Kings	OVHL	4	2	2	0	240	22	0	5.50	—	—	—	—	—	—	—	—
1908–09	Berlin Dutchmen	OPHL	15	9	6	0	890	72	0	4.85	—	—	—	—	—	—	—	—
1909–10	Berlin Dutchmen	OPHL	17	11	6	0	995	75	3	4.53	—	—	—	—	—	—	—	—
1909–10	Galt Professionals	St-Cup	—	—	—	—	—	—	—	—	2	0	2	0	120	15	0	7.50
1909–10	Berlin Dutchmen	St-Cup	—	—	—	—	—	—	—	—	1	0	1	0	60	7	0	7.00
1910–11	Berlin Dutchmen	OPHL	15	7	8	0	900	87	0	5.80	—	—	—	—	—	—	—	—
1911–12	New Westminster Royals	PCHA	15	9	6	0	911	77	0	5.07	—	—	—	—	—	—	—	—
1912–13	New Westminster Royals	PCHA	12	4	8	0	739	51	0	4.14	—	—	—	—	—	—	—	—
1913–14	New Westminster Royals	PCHA	16	7	9	0	997	81	0	4.87	—	—	—	—	—	—	—	—
1914–15	Vancouver Millionaires	PCHA	17	13	4	0	1043	71	1	4.08	—	—	—	—	—	—	—	—
1914–15	Vancouver Millionaires	St-Cup	—	—	—	—	—	—	—	—	3	3	0	0	180	8	0	2.67
1915–16	Vancouver Millionaires	PCHA	18	9	9	0	1091	69	0	3.79	—	—	—	—	—	—	—	—
1916–17	Vancouver Millionaires	PCHA	23	14	9	0	1404	124	0	5.30	—	—	—	—	—	—	—	—
1917–18	Vancouver Millionaires	PCHA	18	9	9	0	1179	60	1	3.05	2	1	0	1	120	2	1	1.00
1917–18	Vancouver Millionaires	St-Cup	—	—	—	—	—	—	—	—	5	2	3	0	300	18	0	3.60
1918–19	Vancouver Millionaires	PCHA	20	12	8	0	1277	55	1	2.58	2	1	1	0	120	7	0	3.50
1919–20	Vancouver Millionaires	PCHA	22	11	11	0	1334	65	1	2.92	2	1	1	0	120	7	0	3.50
1920–21	Vancouver Millionaires	PCHA	24	13	11	0	1449	78	3	3.23	2	2	0	0	120	2	1	2.00
1920–21	Vancouver Millionaires	St-Cup	—	—	—	—	—	—	—	—	5	2	3	0	300	12	0	2.40
1921–22	Vancouver Millionaires	PCHA	22	12	10	0	1318	62	4	2.82	2	2	0	0	120	0	2	0.00
1921–22	Vancouver Millionaires	West-P	—	—	—	—	—	—	—	—	2	1	1	0	120	2	1	1.00
1921–22	Vancouver Millionaires	St-Cup	—	—	—	—	—	—	—	—	5	2	3	0	305	16	1	3.15
1922–23	Vancouver Maroons	PCHA	25	16	8	1	1571	61	5	2.33	2	1	1	0	120	3	1	1.50
1922–23	Vancouver Maroons	St-Cup	—	—	—	—	—	—	—	—	4	1	3	0	240	10	0	2.50
1923–24	Vancouver Maroons	PCHA	30	13	16	1	1846	80	1	2.60	2	1	1	0	134	3	0	1.34
1923–24	Vancouver Maroons	West-P	—	—	—	—	—	—	—	—	3	1	2	0	180	10	0	3.33
1923–24	Vancouver Maroons	St-Cup	—	—	—	—	—	—	—	—	2	0	2	0	120	5	0	2.50
1924–25	Vancouver Maroons	WCHL	11	7	4	0	663	29	0	2.62	—	—	—	—	—	—	—	—
1925–26	Vancouver Maroons	WHL	30	10	18	2	1839	90	3	2.94	—	—	—	—	—	—	—	—
1926–27	Chicago Black Hawks	NHL	44	19	22	3	2797	116	5	2.49	2	0	1	1	120	10	0	5.00
1927–28	Chicago Black Hawks	NHL	4	1	2	1	250	20	1	4.80	—	—	—	—	—	—	—	—
PCHA totals			262	142	118	2	16,159	934	17	3.47	14	9	4	1	854	24	5	1.69
WCHL/WHL totals			41	17	22	2	2502	119	3	2.85	—	—	—	—	—	—	—	—
St-Cup totals			—	—	—	—	—	—	—	—	27	10	17	0	1625	91	1	3.36
NHL totals			48	20	24	4	3407	136	6	2.68	2	0	1	1	120	10	0	5.00

== Coaching record ==
Team	Year	Regular season						Postseason
Team	Year	G	W	L	T	Pts	Division rank	Result
Chicago Black Hawks	1927–28	21	3	17	1	7	5th in American	Did not qualify
NHL totals		21	3	17	1	7		

Preceded by Barney Stanley	Head coach of the Chicago Black Hawks; 1928	Succeeded by Herb Gardiner
