= Vancouver Millionaires =

Former ice hockey team

- City: Vancouver, British Columbia
- League: PCHA (1911–1924); WCHL (1924–1926)
- Operated: 1911–1926
- Home arena: Denman Arena
- Colours: Maroon, cream
- Owner: Frank Patrick
- Head coach: Frank Patrick

Franchise history
- 1911 to 1922: Vancouver Millionaires
- 1922 to 1926: Vancouver Maroons

Championships
- Stanley Cups: 1 (1915)
- Playoff championships: 6 (1915, 1918, 1921, 1922, 1923, 1924)

The Vancouver Millionaires (later known as the Vancouver Maroons) were a professional ice hockey team that competed in the Pacific Coast Hockey Association and the Western Canada Hockey League between 1911 and 1926. Based in Vancouver, British Columbia, they played in Denman Arena, the first artificial ice surface in Canada and the largest indoor ice rink in the world at the time it opened.

The Millionaires/Maroons succeeded as PCHA champions six times (1915, 1918, 1921, 1922, 1923, 1924) and won the Stanley Cup once, in 1915, against the Ottawa Senators of the NHA.

Their jerseys were maroon, featuring a white V with "Vancouver" spelled down one side of the V and up the other. Hall of Famers Fred "Cyclone" Taylor, Mickey MacKay and Didier Pitre were among the most significant players to don the Millionaires/Maroons uniform in the team's history.

On October 1, 2010, the Vancouver Canucks purchased the rights to logos, jerseys and trademarks of the Vancouver Millionaires. Since that time, the Canucks have worn Millionaires throwback uniforms on a few occasions, most notably on March 2, 2014, in the 2014 Heritage Classic against the Ottawa Senators.

== Team history ==
In 1911, the Patrick brothers, Frank and Lester, inaugurated their own professional ice hockey league on the west coast, the Pacific Coast Hockey Association, giving birth to three teams, one of which was the Vancouver Millionaires. Frank aligned himself with Vancouver, playing for, coaching and managing the team. In order to earn credibility as a league, the PCHA lured players from the NHA, and in 1912, the Millionaires acquired the highly touted Cyclone Taylor, who would play for and star in Vancouver for the following ten seasons — the remainder of his career. During his tenure in Vancouver, Taylor tallied 263 points in 131 games.

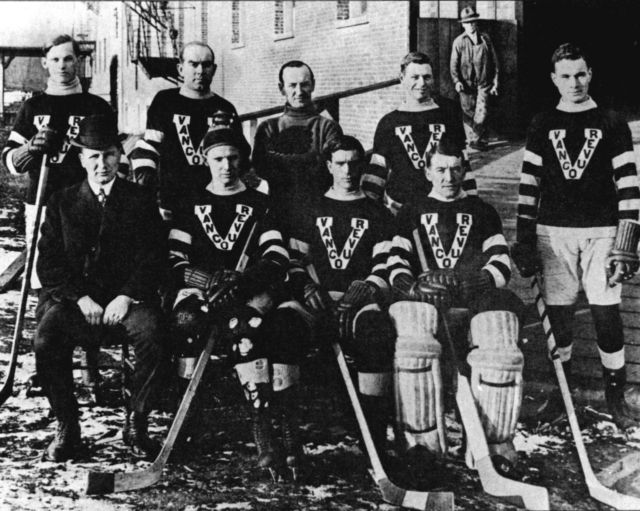
The 1915 Stanley Cup winning team.

Upon the 1914–1915 season, the NHA and PCHA came to an agreement that each league's respective champion would play for the Stanley Cup; in the first year of this agreement, the Millionaires — led by Patrick and Taylor — emerged as league champion and defeated the Ottawa Senators to earn their first and only Stanley Cup championship. In a best-of-five series played at Denman Arena, the Millionaires swept Ottawa by scores of 6–2, 8–3, and 12–3; Taylor led the team with 6 goals. At the time, it was the furthest west the Cup had been awarded and is Vancouver's only Stanley Cup champion.

In 1918, Vancouver would once again compete for the Stanley Cup, defeating the Seattle Metropolitans in a two-game final for the PCHA title, but would be defeated by the Toronto Arenas of the NHL (evolved from the NHA) three games to two. Between 1918 and 1924, Vancouver would win the PCHA title in five of seven seasons. In 1921 and 1922, they were defeated by the Ottawa Senators and Toronto St. Pats in back-to-back Cup Final, respectively. In 1922, the team changed its name to the Vancouver Maroons and, although league champion in the PCHA's final two seasons, Vancouver would not compete for the Stanley Cup. As a result of the newly founded Western Canada Hockey League, the PCHA champion would have to defeat the WCHL champion en route to a Cup series against the NHL champion; the Maroons would fall to the Edmonton Eskimos in 1923 and the Calgary Tigers in 1924.

Following the 1923–1924 season, the Maroons were absorbed by the WCHL upon the PCHA's demise, but would not achieve the same success of the previous years. In 1926, the WCHL suffered the same fate of the PCHA, and after 15 years, the team subsequently folded, as well.

== Tributes ==
In 1999, musician and bodybuilder Jon Mikl Thor started VM Sports, a company to market a line of Millionaires apparel. Since there were no genuine Millionaires sweaters in existence since a fire destroyed Denman Arena in 1936, Thor trademarked the Vancouver Millionaires name and the "Victory V" logo. On May 1, 2008, the BC Sports Hall Of Fame was donated one such Millionaires sweater from VM Sports, which is now featured in the Hall's Cyclone Taylor display. On October 1, 2010 the Vancouver Canucks parent company, Canucks Sports & Entertainment, acquired the Vancouver Millionaires trademark from Thor.

In honour of the Millionaires as the city's only Stanley Cup-winning team, the Vancouver Giants, a major junior Western Hockey League (WHL) team, wore Millionaires jerseys during their November 21, 2008 game against the Kamloops Blazers on the team's "Stanley Cup Legends Night". That same month, the Canucks unveiled their new third jerseys, including a new shoulder logo that pays tribute to the Millionaires by including a "V".

In the 2012–13 season the Vancouver Canucks added the Millionaires' "V" to their jersey. They wore a modified version of the Millionaires jersey on March 16, 2013 against the Detroit Red Wings. They again wore the Millionaires jersey for the 2014 Heritage Classic on March 2, 2014, against the Ottawa Senators, who wore a version of the original Senators jersey. The Millionaires jersey was worn a third time on March 26, 2015, against the Colorado Avalanche.

== Season-by-season record ==
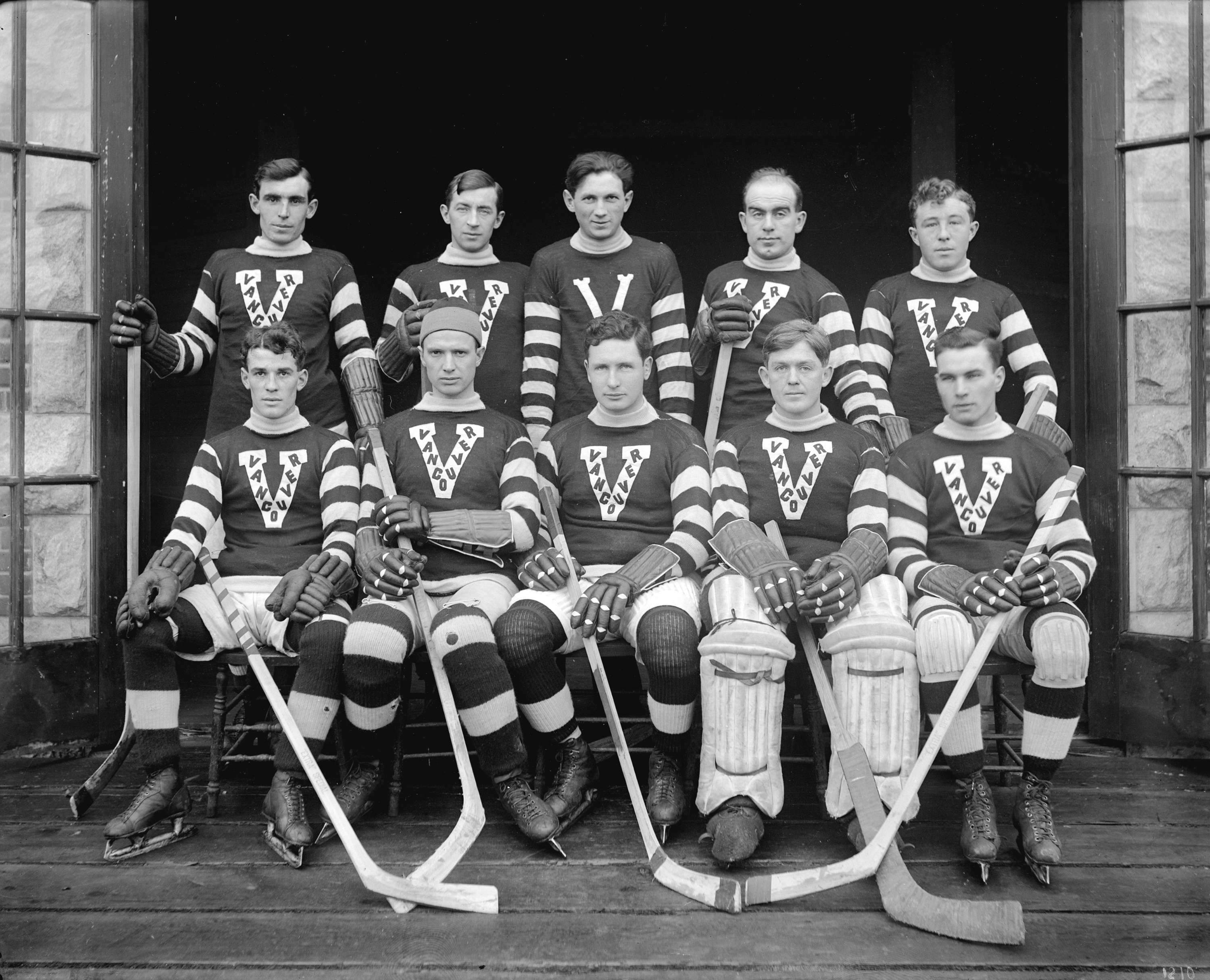
Vancouver Millionaires for the 1913–14 season.

Note: W = Wins, L = Losses, T = Ties, GF= Goals For, GA = Goals Against

Season	Name	League	GP	W	L	T	GF	GA	Finish	Playoffs
1912	Millionaires	PCHA	15	7	8	0	102	94	2nd	-
1912–13	Millionaires	PCHA	16	7	9	0	84	89	2nd	-
1913–14	Millionaires	PCHA	15	6	9	0	76	83	3rd	-
1914–15	Millionaires	PCHA	17	13	4	0	115	71	1st	Won Stanley Cup
1915–16	Millionaires	PCHA	18	9	9	0	75	69	2nd	-
1916–17	Millionaires	PCHA	24	14	9	0	71	124	2nd	-
1917–18	Millionaires	PCHA	18	9	9	0	70	60	2nd	Lost in Cup final
1918–19	Millionaires	PCHA	20	12	8	0	72	55	1st	Lost league playoff
1919–20	Millionaires	PCHA	22	11	11	0	75	65	2nd	-
1920–21	Millionaires	PCHA	24	13	11	0	86	79	1st	Lost in Cup final
1921–22	Millionaires	PCHA	24	12	12	0	77	68	2nd	Lost in Cup final
1922–23	Maroons	PCHA	29	16	12	1	116	88	1st	Lost in Cup semifinal
1923–24	Maroons	PCHA	30	13	16	1	87	80	2nd	Lost in Cup semifinal
1924–25	Maroons	WCHL	28	12	16	0	91	102	5th	-
1925–26	Maroons	WHL	30	10	18	2	64	90	6th	-

== Hall of Fame players ==
- Jack Adams
- Rusty Crawford
- Si Griffis
- Newsy Lalonde
- Hughie Lehman
- Mickey MacKay
- Frank Nighbor
- Frank Patrick
- Tommy Phillips
- Didier Pitre
- Gordon Roberts
- Barney Stanley
- Cyclone Taylor

== See also ==
- 1914–15 Vancouver Millionaires season
- List of Stanley Cup champions
- List of ice hockey teams in British Columbia
