= Pacific Coast Hockey Association =

Professional ice hockey league

- Sport: Ice hockey
- Founded: 1911 (115 years ago)
- First season: 1912
- Folded: 1924 (102 years ago)
- Countries: Canada; United States
- Last champion: Vancouver Maroons (1923–24)
- Most titles: Vancouver Millionaires; (Vancouver Maroons) (6)

The Pacific Coast Hockey Association (PCHA) was a professional ice hockey league in Western Canada and the Western United States, which operated from 1911 to 1924 when it then merged with the Western Canada Hockey League (WCHL). The PCHA was considered to be a major league of ice hockey and was important in the development of the sport of professional ice hockey through its innovations.

The league was started by the Patrick family, professional hockey players from Montreal, building new arenas in Vancouver and Victoria, British Columbia. After a few years of play, the league was accepted by the Stanley Cup trustees as being of a high enough standard that teams from its league were accepted for Stanley Cup challenges. Starting in 1915, the league entered into an agreement where the Stanley Cup was to be contested between the National Hockey Association and the PCHA after the regular seasons were finished. The league struggled to make money, and various teams moved into different cities in an attempt to be successful financially. Eventually, the league, to survive, merged with the WCHL in 1924.

== History ==
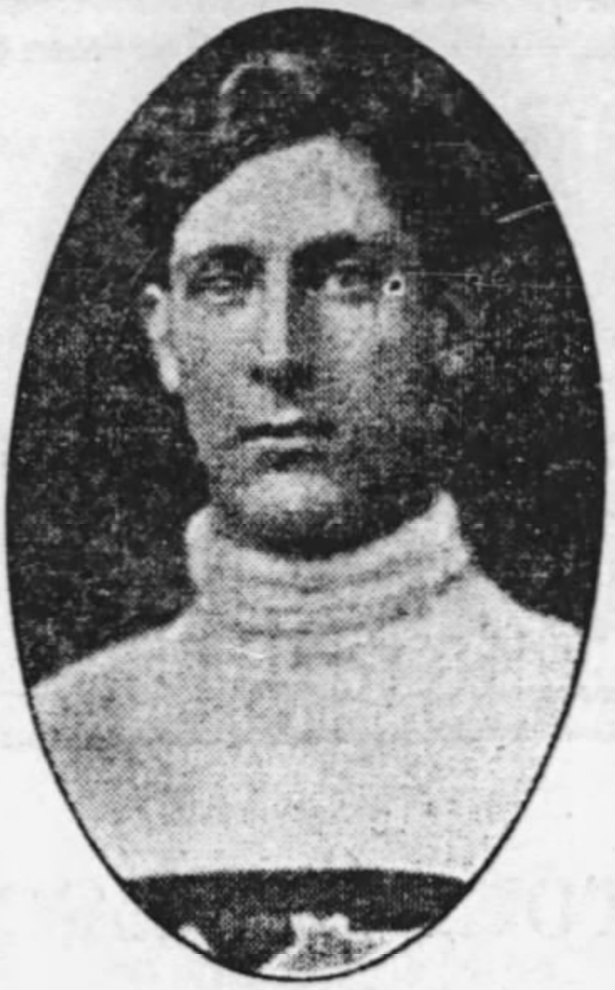
Lester Patrick

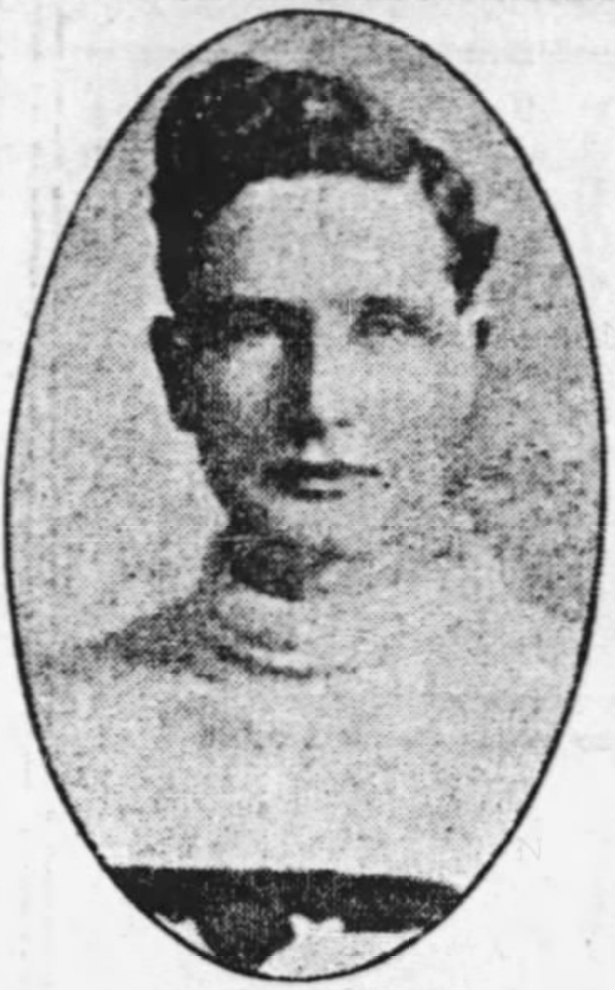
Frank Patrick

After playing for the Renfrew Millionaires in 1910, the brothers Frank and Lester Patrick moved west to Nelson, British Columbia to work in their father Joe's lumbering business. Lester and Frank had both played with the Nelson Hockey Club in the West Kootenay Hockey League priorly, during the 1908–09 season. After Joe Patrick decided to sell the business in January 1911, the Patricks decided then to form a new professional ice hockey league, risking the family fortune. The decision was made to put new rinks in Vancouver and Victoria, British Columbia, locations which necessitated the use of artificial ice, as the locations' climate prevented natural ice. Three teams: the New Westminster Royals, the Victoria Senators, and the Vancouver Millionaires would be formed. The Patricks moved quickly, buying property for the arenas in February. Ground was broken for the arenas in April and the arenas were completed in December. Victoria's arena seated 4,000, and cost $110,000 and the flagship arena in Vancouver had 10,500 seats and cost $210,000 to build.

Once it became clear that the arenas would be built in time, the Patricks raided the National Hockey Association (NHA) for players, although with only three teams and no substitutes, the entire league only had 23 players under contract (including two reserves in case of injury). All players were paid by the league, unlike the NHA with its competing teams. The PCHA distributed players amongst the teams. Newsy Lalonde of the Canadiens would be the most notable player to move west, to play for Vancouver. The league was formally organized on December 7, 1911, to be run by Frank and Lester, who would also play for and manage the Vancouver and Victoria teams. The Victoria arena would open to the public on Christmas Day 1911, and the first game of the PCHA was played on January 3, 1912, only a year after the Patricks decided to form the new league. The first league championship for the Patterson Cup trophy was won by the New Westminster Royals.

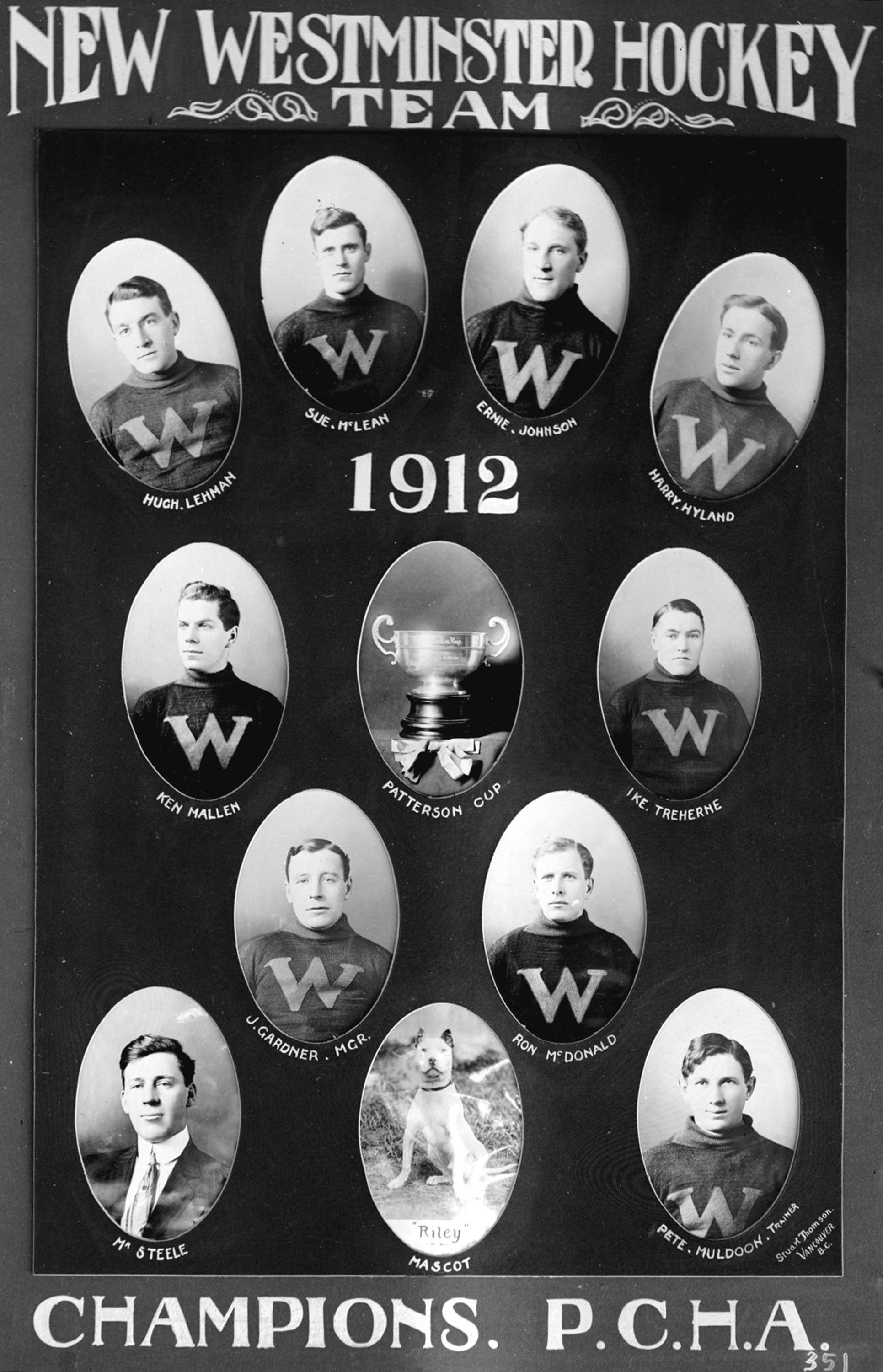
New Westminster Royals in 1912, first champions of the Patterson Cup

The league did not challenge for the Stanley Cup the first year. Despite the raiding of the NHA, a March 1912 west coast tour of the NHA's all-stars was arranged, billed as a sort of "World Series" of hockey. The NHA all-stars included Cyclone Taylor, a marquee name in the East, who had injured his hand refereeing a benefit game for Bruce Ridpath before coming out west and didn't play the first two games. After the PCHA all-stars won the first two games 10–4 and 5–1, leaving the series outcome in no doubt, the NHA manager Art Ross decided to let Taylor play at the Patrick's request. Taylor would put on an outstanding display of ice hockey prowess for the British Columbia fans and receive a two-minute ovation. Taylor, already rumoured to have signed with Vancouver, would later turn down a contract offer of the Ottawa Hockey Club of the NHA to join the Millionaires in December 1912 for a yearly salary of $1,800, the top salary of any player at the time.

For the 1912–13 season the PCHA continued to raid the east for players. Besides Taylor, Goldie Prodgers, Eddie Oatman, Jack McDonald and Ernie Johnson moved out west, although Newsy Lalonde returned to Montreal. The New Westminster rink, to be built by local interests, was not ready and the Royals continued to play in Vancouver. Victoria would win the season and the club arranged for an exhibition series of the Stanley Cup champion Quebec Bulldogs. Victoria would defeat the Bulldogs, two victories to one.

During the 1913–14 season, the PCHA and the NHA started to act together, coming to agreements to recognize each other's player suspensions and contracts, and instituting a controlled "draft" process to facilitate the transfer of players. In a further agreement, the champions of each league would face each other for the Stanley Cup. After the 1914 season, league champion Victoria came east to play the first "World Series of hockey" challenge series with the Toronto Blueshirts for the Stanley Cup. After the series, the Stanley Cup trustees came to agreement with the NHA and PCHA and the challenge era of the Stanley Cup came to an end. Yearly playoffs between the leagues would become the new manner of deciding the Stanley Cup champion. In the 1914–15 season, Vancouver defeated the Ottawa Senators in a best-of-five series to become the PCHA's first Stanley Cup champions.

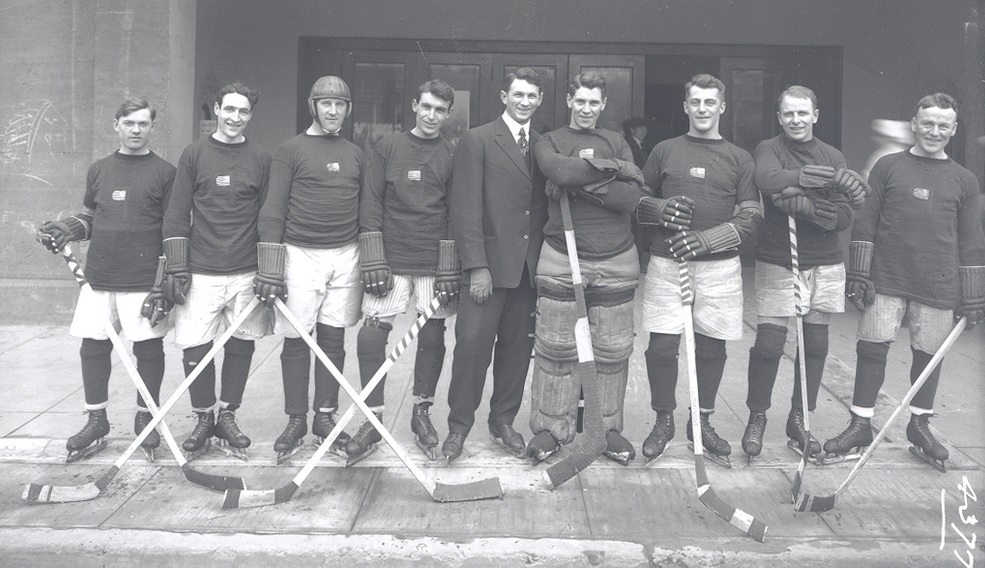
1914–15 Portland Rosebuds

The league expanded into the United States in 1914 (Portland, Oregon) and again in 1915 (Seattle, Washington). In 1916, the Portland Rosebuds became the first American team to play for the Stanley Cup and the following year the Seattle Metropolitans became the first American team to win the Cup—forever changing the mandate of the Cup, which had initially been to recognize the top hockey club in Canada.

Relations with the NHA turned sour in 1915, with the Patricks accusing the league of reneging on their agreements. In retaliation, the PCHA again went on a raid for NHA players, particularly ones with the Toronto Blueshirts. Five players from Toronto became the core of the new Seattle team.

In 1918, the PCHA introduced playoffs for the first time. Until that year, the team with the best record over the season had been declared the champion and challenged for the Stanley Cup. With the creation of playoffs, it was the winner in the post-season who would be league champion.

In 1921, the Western Canada Hockey League, another western major league of hockey, was formed, and the Stanley Cup playoffs were modified to include teams from the WCHL. The following two years, which would turn out to be the last two years of the PCHA, the league played interleague games with the WCHL. In the last year of the PCHA, all three remaining teams finished with losing records.

In 1924, the Seattle Metropolitans folded, and the two remaining teams in Vancouver and Victoria joined the WCHL (renamed the Western Hockey League), putting an end to the PCHA. The Victoria Cougars would win the Stanley Cup in 1925, but this win would be the last by a non-NHL team, and the last by a team from the west coast until the Anaheim Ducks won the Stanley Cup in 2007.

The merged league did not last long, as the WHL was unable to match the NHL's American expansion and its player salaries, which led the Patrick brothers to sell players or, in the case of the Portland Rosebuds and the Victoria Cougars, the team itself. The expansion Chicago Black Hawks bought the Rosebud players for a reported $15,000, while the expansion Detroit team bought the Victoria players for $25,000 and named itself the Detroit Cougars in tribute; this team became the present-day Detroit Red Wings.

== Innovations ==
The league introduced numerous innovations to the sport of ice hockey:

- blue lines and goal creases
- forward passing
- penalty shots
- playoffs
- removed rule that goalies must stay on their feet

The PCHA also developed a farm system for players, and were the first Canadian league to expand into the United States.

The PCHA is also credited with introducing numbers to player sweaters for identification purposes (starting in 1911–12), but this had also been experimented with in the NHA at the same time.

Among professional ice hockey leagues in North America, the PCHA was the last to play "seven-man hockey", which included the rover position. In 1923, the PCHA decided to drop the rover position, as it was seen to be crowding the ice and therefore reducing the speed of play.

== Women's ice hockey ==
International Ladies' Hockey League
- Sport: Ice hockey
- Founded: 1921
- Countries: Canada; United States
- Most recent champion: Vancouver Amazons

As early as January 1916, Frank and Lester Patrick talked of the formation of a women's league to complement the Pacific Coast Hockey Association. The proposal included teams from Vancouver, Victoria, Portland, and Seattle. The league never formed.

=== International Ladies' Hockey League (1921) ===
In February 1921, Frank Patrick announced a women's international championship series that would be played in conjunction with the Pacific Coast Hockey Association. The three teams that competed were the Vancouver Amazons, Victoria Kewpies, and Seattle Vamps. This organized tournament, called the International Ladies’ Hockey League, was the world's first in the women's sport to include entrants from multiple nations.

On February 21, 1921, the Seattle Vamps competed against the Vancouver Amazons in Vancouver, and were vanquished by a 5–0 score. Two days later, the Vamps played against a team from the University of British Columbia and won the game. Jerry Reed scored three goals (a hat trick) in the game for the Vamps. In both games, the Vancouver media referred to the Seattle team as the Seattle Sweeties. The Amazons would travel to Seattle and defeat them again. On March 2, 1921, the Vamps were defeated by the Kewpies 1–0 in Seattle. In the rematch on March 12, the Vamps travelled to Victoria. The result was a 1–1 tie, and Jerry Reed scored the goal for Seattle. The goaltender for the Vamps was Mildren Terran. After the 1921 season, the Vamps and the Kewpies ceased operations.

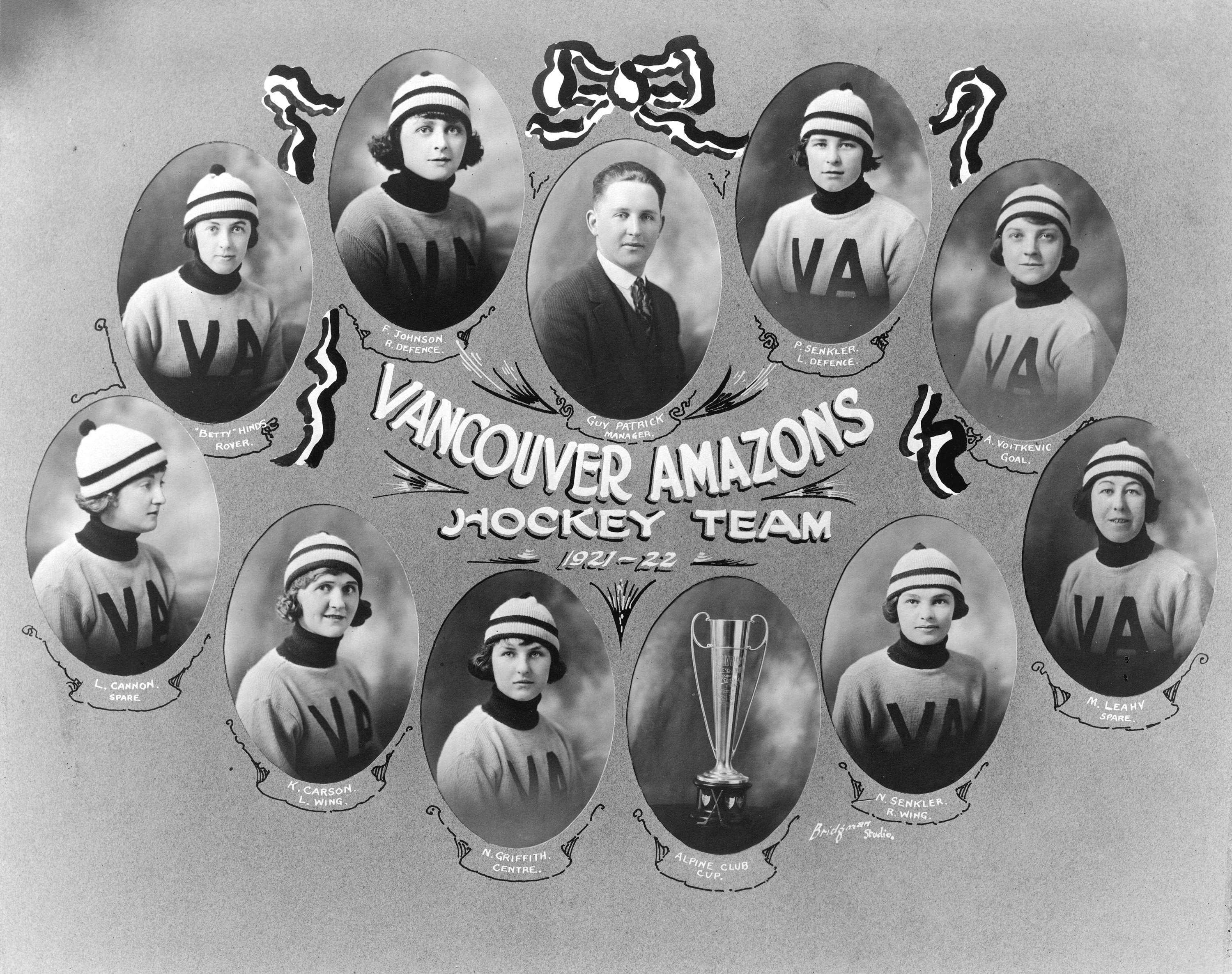
Vancouver Amazons with the Alpine Club Cup in the 1921–22 season. Lester and Frank Patrick's brother Guy coached the team.

== Seasons of play ==
†	Stanley Cup champion
‡	Stanley Cup runner-up

Season	Teams	Champion
1912	New Westminster Royals, Vancouver Millionaires, Victoria Senators	New Westminster Royals
1912–13	New Westminster Royals, Vancouver Millionaires, Victoria Senators	Victoria Senators
1913–14	New Westminster Royals, Vancouver Millionaires, Victoria Aristocrats	Victoria Aristocrats
1914–15	Portland Rosebuds, Vancouver Millionaires, Victoria Aristocrats	Vancouver Millionaires †
1915–16	Portland Rosebuds, Seattle Metropolitans, Vancouver Millionaires, Victoria Aristocrats	Portland Rosebuds ‡
1916–17	Portland Rosebuds, Seattle Metropolitans, Vancouver Millionaires, Spokane Canaries	Seattle Metropolitans †
1917–18	Portland Rosebuds, Seattle Metropolitans, Vancouver Millionaires	Vancouver Millionaires (two-game playoff against Seattle) ‡
1919	Seattle Metropolitans, Vancouver Millionaires, Victoria Aristocrats	Seattle Metropolitans (two-game playoff against Vancouver)
1919–20	Seattle Metropolitans, Vancouver Millionaires, Victoria Aristocrats	Seattle Metropolitans (two-game playoff against Vancouver) ‡
1920–21	Seattle Metropolitans, Vancouver Millionaires, Victoria Aristocrats	Vancouver Millionaires (two-game playoff against Seattle) ‡
1921–22	Seattle Metropolitans, Vancouver Millionaires, Victoria Aristocrats	Vancouver Millionaires (two-game playoff against Seattle) ‡
1922–23	Seattle Metropolitans, Vancouver Maroons, Victoria Cougars	Vancouver Maroons (two-game playoff against Victoria)
1923–24	Seattle Metropolitans, Vancouver Maroons, Victoria Cougars	Vancouver Maroons (two-game playoff against Seattle)

== All-Star teams and other awards ==
- 1913–14 – Hugh Lehman, New Westminster, goal; Moose Johnson, New Westminster, and Frank Patrick, Vancouver on defence; Cyclone Taylor, Vancouver, rover; and Tom Dunderdale, Victoria, Eddie Oatman, New Westminster, and Dubbie Kerr, Victoria, forward.
- 1914–15 – Hugh Lehman, Vancouver, goal; Moose Johnson, Portland, and Lester Patrick, Victoria on defence; Cyclone Taylor, Vancouver, rover; and Mickey MacKay, Vancouver, Eddie Oatman, Portland, and Frank Nighbor, Vancouver, forward.
- 1916–17 – Frank Foyston, Seattle - most valuable player
- 1917–18 – Cyclone Taylor, Vancouver - most valuable player

== Career leading scorers ==
GP = Games Played, G = Goals, A = Assists, Pts = Points

Player	GP	G	A	Pts
Mickey MacKay	245	200	90	290
Cyclone Taylor	137	158	104	262
Tommy Dunderdale	239	193	60	253
Frank Foyston	239	186	61	247
Smokey Harris	251	155	89	244
Bernie Morris	163	154	76	230
Eddie Oatman	191	123	75	198
Frank Fredrickson	161	131	61	192
Lloyd Cook	222	107	57	164
Jack Walker	225	85	65	150

Source: Bowlsby 2012, p. 378

== See also ==
- List of Stanley Cup champions
- List of pre-NHL seasons
- List of ice hockey leagues
