= 1920–21 Hamilton Tigers season =

National Hockey League team season

1920–21 Hamilton Tigers
- League: 4th NHL
- 1920–21 record: 6–18–0
- Home record: 4–8–0
- Road record: 2–10–0
- Goals for: 92
- Goals against: 132

Team information
- General manager: Percy Thompson
- Coach: Percy Thompson
- Arena: Barton Street Arena

Team leaders
- Goals: Joe Malone (28)
- Assists: Joe Malone (9); Goldie Prodgers (9); Joe Matte (9)
- Points: Joe Malone (37)
- Penalty minutes: Billy Coutu (117)
- Wins: Howard Lockhart (6)
- Goals against average: Howard Lockhart (5.45)

The 1920–21 Hamilton Tigers season was the first season of play for the new Hamilton Tigers team in the National Hockey League (NHL). The Tigers finished in last place in both halves of the season and did not qualify for the playoffs. The team previously had played in Quebec City, where they were known as the Quebec Bulldogs, but had been sold to Hamilton interests in 1920. Joe Malone led the team in scoring, with 28 goals in 20 games.

== Offseason ==
The NHL transferred the Quebec franchise to Hamilton, where it was named the Tigers, a nickname used by a multitude of sports teams in the city. Contemporary newspaper coverage often referred to the senior team of the same name in the OHA as the "Tigers", while the NHL team would either be nameless or simply referred to as "professionals".

== Regular season ==
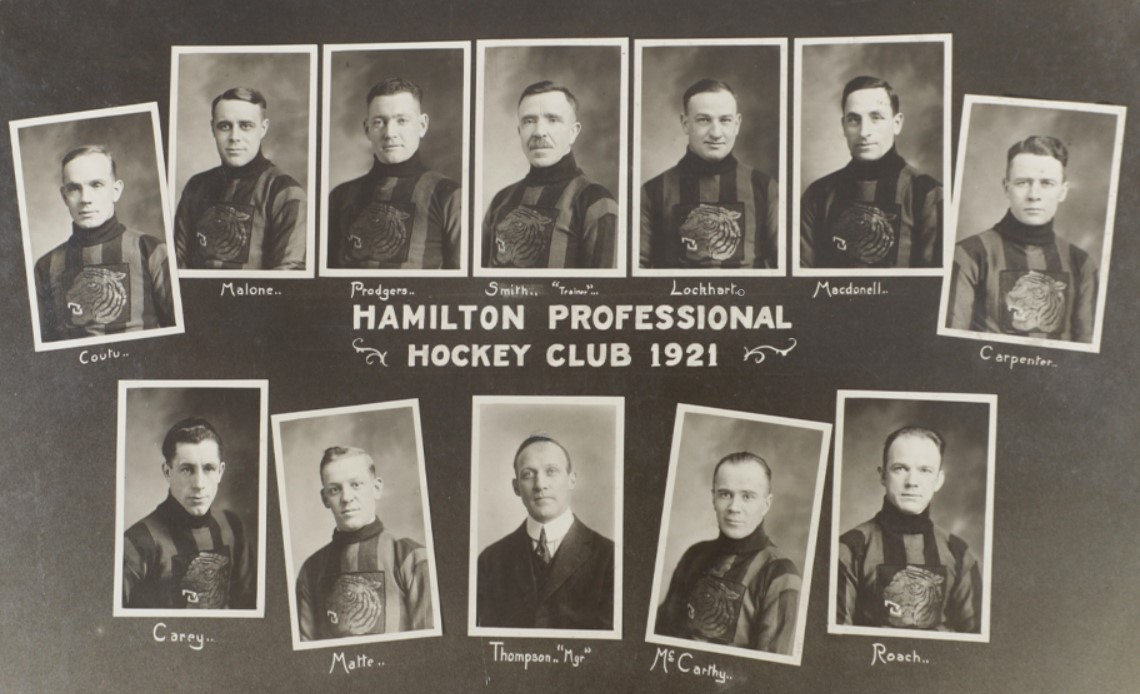
1921 Hamilton Tigers

Noting that the Quebec Athletics finished in last place in 1919–20, the league encouraged the other teams to provide players to Hamilton to improve the team's competitiveness. Toronto provided Babe Dye but recalled Dye after the first game and loaned Mickey Roach. Montreal provided Billy Coutu in exchange for keeping Harry Mummery. Ottawa did not provide any players willingly. Sprague Cleghorn and Harry Broadbent were eventually ordered by the league to report to Hamilton, but neither did. Cleghorn played some games with Toronto before returning to Ottawa.

Joe Malone missed the start of the season due to business commitments keeping him in Quebec. He joined the team in January 1921, having missed four games. He scored 28 goals in 20 games for the Tigers to place fourth in the league in goal-scoring. However, the team won only three games in each half of the schedule to finish last, with a record of 6 wins and 18 losses.

=== Final standings ===
First half
	GP	W	L	T	Pts	GF	GA
**Ottawa Senators**	10	8	2	0	**16**	49	23
Toronto St. Patricks	10	5	5	0	**10**	39	47
Montreal Canadiens	10	4	6	0	**8**	37	51
Hamilton Tigers	10	3	7	0	**6**	34	38

Second half
	GP	W	L	T	Pts	GF	GA
**Toronto St. Patricks**	14	10	4	0	**20**	66	53
Montreal Canadiens	14	9	5	0	**18**	75	48
Ottawa Senators	14	6	8	0	**12**	48	52
Hamilton Tigers	14	3	11	0	**6**	58	94

Note: W = Wins, L = Losses, T = Ties, GF= Goals For, GA = Goals Against, Pts = Points
Note: Teams that qualified for playoffs highlighted in bold.

=== Record vs. opponents ===
1920–21 NHL Records
Team	HAM	MTL	OTT	TOR
Hamilton	—	3–5	1–7	2–6
Montreal	5–3	—	5–3	3–5
Ottawa	7–1	3–5	—	4–4
Toronto	6–2	5–3	4–4	—

== Schedule and results ==
1920–21 regular season
First half

Game	Result	Date	Score	Opponent	Record
1	W	December 22, 1920	5–0	Montreal Canadiens (1920–21)	1–0–0
2	L	December 27, 1920	1–3	@ Ottawa Senators (1920–21)	1–1–0
3	W	December 29, 1920	6–2	@ Montreal Canadiens (1920–21)	2–1–0
4	L	January 3, 1921	4–5	Toronto St. Patricks (1920–21)	2–2–0
5	L	January 6, 1921	1–5	Ottawa Senators (1920–21)	2–3–0
6	W	January 8, 1921	3–2 OT	@ Toronto St. Patricks (1920–21)	3–3–0
7	L	January 12, 1921	2–4	Toronto St. Patricks (1920–21)	3–4–0
8	L	January 15, 1921	4–6	@ Montreal Canadiens (1920–21)	3–5–0
9	L	January 19, 1921	3–4	@ Ottawa Senators (1920–21)	3–6–0
10	L	January 22, 1921	5–7	Montreal Canadiens (1920–21)	3–7–0

Second half

Game	Result	Date	Score	Opponent	Record
11	L	January 26, 1921	3–10	@ Toronto St. Patricks (1920–21)	0–1–0
12	L	January 29, 1921	1–2	Ottawa Senators (1920–21)	0–2–0
13	W	February 2, 1921	6–5	Montreal Canadiens (1920–21)	1–2–0
14	L	February 5, 1921	3–7	Ottawa Senators (1920–21)	1–3–0
15	L	February 9, 1921	4–7	@ Ottawa Senators (1920–21)	1–4–0
16	L	February 12, 1921	4–6	Toronto St. Patricks (1920–21)	1–5–0
17	L	February 16, 1921	5–10	@ Montreal Canadiens (1920–21)	1–6–0
18	L	February 19, 1921	4–5	@ Toronto St. Patricks (1920–21)	1–7–0
19	W	February 23, 1921	7–4	Toronto St. Patricks (1920–21)	2–7–0
20	L	February 26, 1921	6–13	@ Montreal Canadiens (1920–21)	2–8–0
21	W	February 28, 1921	6–2	Ottawa Senators (1920–21)	3–8–0
22	L	March 2, 1921	1–7	Montreal Canadiens (1920–21)	3–9–0
23	L	March 5, 1921	3–4 OT	@ Toronto St. Patricks (1920–21)	3–10–0
24	L	March 7, 1921	5–12	@ Ottawa Senators (1920–21)	3–11–0

Legend: Win (2 points) Loss (0 points) Tie (1 point)

== Player statistics ==
Regular season
Scoring

Player	Pos	GP	G	A	Pts	PIM
Joe Malone	C/LW	20	28	9	37	6
Goldie Prodgers	F/D	24	18	9	27	8
Mickey Roach	C	14	9	8	17	0
Joe Matte	D	21	6	9	15	29
Billy Coutu	D	24	8	4	12	95
Thomas McCarthy	RW	23	10	1	11	10
George Carey	RW	20	6	1	7	8
Eddie Carpenter	D	21	2	1	3	17
Moylan McDonnell	D	22	1	2	3	2
Babe Dye	RW	1	2	0	2	0
Leo Reise	D	6	2	0	2	8
Jack Coughlin	RW	2	0	0	0	0
Howard Lockhart	G	24	0	0	0	0
Ed Lowrey	C	5	0	0	0	0
Fred McLean	D	1	0	0	0	0
Charles Pletsch	D	1	0	0	0	0

Goaltending

Player	MIN	GP	W	L	T	GA	GAA	SO
Howard Lockhart	1454	24	6	18	0	132	5.45	1
Team:	1454	24	6	18	0	132	5.45	1

Note: Pos = Position; GP = Games played; G = Goals; A = Assists; Pts = Points; PIM = Penalty minutes
MIN = Minutes played; W = Wins; L = Losses; T = Ties; GA = Goals-against; GAA = Goals-against average; SO = Shutouts;

== Transactions ==
=== Trades ===
Date	From Tigers	To Tigers
November 11, 1920	To Montreal Canadiens Harry Mummery, Jack McDonald, Dave Ritchie	Jack Coughlin, Goldie Prodgers, Joe Matte, Billy Coutu (loan)
December 4, 1920	To Toronto St. Patricks	Babe Dye (loan)
December 24, 1920	To Toronto St. Patricks Babe Dye	
December 30, 1920	To Ottawa Senators (original)	Punch Broadbent, Sprague Cleghorn (loan)
January 4, 1921	To Montreal Canadiens Punch Broadbent, Sprague Cleghorn (players did not report)	cash
January 25, 1921	To Toronto St. Patricks Sprague Cleghorn (did not report)	

Source: "Hockey Transactions Search Results". prosportstransactions.com.

== See also ==
- 1920–21 NHL season
