= 1920–21 Montreal Canadiens season =

NHL hockey team season

1920–21 Montreal Canadiens
- League: 3rd (1st half), 2nd (2nd half) NHL
- 1920–21 record: 4–6–0 (1st half), 9–5–0 (2nd half)
- Home record: 9–3–0
- Road record: 4–8–0
- Goals for: 112
- Goals against: 99

Team information
- General manager: George Kennedy
- Coach: Newsy Lalonde
- Captain: Newsy Lalonde
- Arena: Mount Royal Arena

Team leaders
- Goals: Newsy Lalonde (33)
- Assists: Newsy Lalonde (10)
- Points: Newsy Lalonde (43)
- Penalty minutes: Bert Corbeau (84)
- Wins: Georges Vezina (13)
- Goals against average: Georges Vezina (4.12)

The 1920–21 Montreal Canadiens season was the team's 12th season and fourth as a member of the National Hockey League (NHL). The Canadiens, for the second season in a row, did not qualify for the playoffs for the first time since the 1911–12 season and the 1912–13 season, finishing third in the first half and second in the second half of the season.

The team saw some turnover from the previous season's team. Harry Cameron, Billy Coutu, Jack Coughlin, Howard McNamara and Don Smith were gone. In their place was Billy Bell, Dave Campbell, Jack McDonald, Harry Mummery, Dave Ritchie and Cully Wilson. Coutu was traded to the new Hamilton Tigers for Mummery. Cameron returned to Toronto and picked up Wilson. McDonald and Ritchie were picked up as free agents while Campbell was a new professional from the Laval University ranks and would only play in three games.

== Regular season ==
Georges Vezina came third in the league in goals against average of 4.1 per game. Newsy Lalonde led the Canadiens in offence, scoring 32 goals and 10 assists to win the league scoring championship.

=== Final standings ===
First half
	GP	W	L	T	Pts	GF	GA
**Ottawa Senators**	10	8	2	0	**16**	49	23
Toronto St. Patricks	10	5	5	0	**10**	39	47
Montreal Canadiens	10	4	6	0	**8**	37	51
Hamilton Tigers	10	3	7	0	**6**	34	38

Second half
	GP	W	L	T	Pts	GF	GA
**Toronto St. Patricks**	14	10	4	0	**20**	66	53
Montreal Canadiens	14	9	5	0	**18**	75	48
Ottawa Senators	14	6	8	0	**12**	48	52
Hamilton Tigers	14	3	11	0	**6**	58	94

Note: W = Wins, L = Losses, T = Ties, GF= Goals For, GA = Goals Against, Pts = Points
Note: Teams that qualified for playoffs highlighted in bold.

=== Record vs. opponents ===
1920–21 NHL Records
Team	HAM	MTL	OTT	TOR
Hamilton	—	3–5	1–7	2–6
Montreal	5–3	—	5–3	3–5
Ottawa	7–1	3–5	—	4–4
Toronto	6–2	5–3	4–4	—

== Schedule and results ==
1920–21 regular season
First half

Game	Result	Date	Score	Opponent	Record
1	L	December 22, 1920	0–5	@ Hamilton Tigers (1920–21)	0–1–0
2	L	December 25, 1920	4–5	@ Toronto St. Patricks (1920–21)	0–2–0
3	L	December 29, 1920	2–6	Hamilton Tigers (1920–21)	0–3–0
4	L	January 3, 1921	2–8	@ Ottawa Senators (1920–21)	0–4–0
5	W	January 8, 1921	5–4	Ottawa Senators (1920–21)	1–4–0
6	L	January 12, 1921	0–2	@ Ottawa Senators (1920–21)	1–5–0
7	W	January 15, 1921	6–4	Hamilton Tigers (1920–21)	2–5–0
8	W	January 17, 1921	9–5	Toronto St. Patricks (1920–21)	3–5–0
9	L	January 19, 1921	2–7	@ Toronto St. Patricks (1920–21)	3–6–0
10	W	January 22, 1921	7–5	@ Hamilton Tigers (1920–21)	4–6–0

Second half

Game	Result	Date	Score	Opponent	Record
11	W	January 26, 1921	5–3	Ottawa Senators (1920–21)	1–0–0
12	W	January 29, 1921	4–2	Toronto St. Patricks (1920–21)	2–0–0
13	L	February 2, 1921	5–6	@ Hamilton Tigers (1920–21)	2–1–0
14	L	February 5, 1921	6–10	@ Toronto St. Patricks (1920–21)	2–2–0
15	L	February 9, 1921	3–5	Toronto St. Patricks (1920–21)	2–3–0
16	W	February 12, 1921	3–1	@ Ottawa Senators (1920–21)	3–3–0
17	W	February 16, 1921	10–5	Hamilton Tigers (1920–21)	4–3–0
18	W	February 19, 1921	8–1	Ottawa Senators (1920–21)	5–3–0
19	W	February 23, 1921	3–1	@ Ottawa Senators (1920–21)	6–3–0
20	W	February 26, 1921	13–6	Hamilton Tigers (1920–21)	7–3–0
21	W	February 28, 1921	4–0	Toronto St. Patricks (1920–21)	8–3–0
22	W	March 2, 1921	7–1	@ Hamilton Tigers (1920–21)	9–3–0
23	L	March 5, 1921	0–1	Ottawa Senators (1920–21)	9–4–0
24	L	March 7, 1921	4–6	@ Toronto St. Patricks (1920–21)	9–5–0

Legend: Win (2 points) Loss (0 points) Tie (1 point)

== Player statistics ==
Regular season stats
Scoring

Player	#	Pos	GP	G	A	Pts	PIM
Newsy Lalonde	4	C	24	33	10	43	36
Didier Pitre	5	RW/D	23	16	5	21	25
Harry Mummery	2	D	24	15	5	20	69
Louis Berlinguette	6	LW	24	11	9	20	28
Amos Arbour	7	LW	23	15	3	18	40
Bert Corbeau	3	D	24	11	2	13	86
Odie Cleghorn	8	RW/C	21	6	6	12	8
Cully Wilson†	11	RW	11	6	1	7	29
Jack McDonald‡	10	LW	6	0	1	1	0
Billy Bell	9	C/RW	4	0	0	0	2
Dave Campbell	10	D	2	0	0	0	0
Dave Ritchie	9	D	6	0	0	0	2
Georges Vezina	1	G	24	0	0	0	0

Goaltending

Player	MIN	GP	W	L	T	GA	GAA	SO
Georges Vezina	1441	24	13	11	0	99	4.12	1
Team:	1441	24	13	11	0	99	4.12	1

Note: Pos = Position; GP = Games played; G = Goals; A = Assists; Pts = Points; PIM = Penalty minutes
MIN = Minutes played; W = Wins; L = Losses; T = Ties; GA = Goals-against; GAA = Goals-against average; SO = Shutouts;
† = spent time with another team before joining Canadiens, stats reflect time with the Canadiens only;
‡ = loaned to another team, stats reflect time with the Canadiens only;

== Transactions ==
- traded Harry Cameron to Toronto St. Pats for cash, November 27, 1920
- acquired Jack McDonald, Harry Mummery and Dave Ritchie from Hamilton Tigers for Jack Coughlin and the loan of Billy Coutu, November 29, 1920
- Cully Wilson loaned for season from Toronto St. Pats, January 21, 1921
- returned Cully Wilson to Toronto St. Pats, February 11, 1921
- loaned Jack McDonald to Toronto St. Pats for the rest of the season, February 11, 1921
- signed Dave Campbell as a free agent, February 26, 1921

== See also ==
- 1920–21 NHL season
