= George Prodgers =

Canadian ice hockey player (1891–1935)

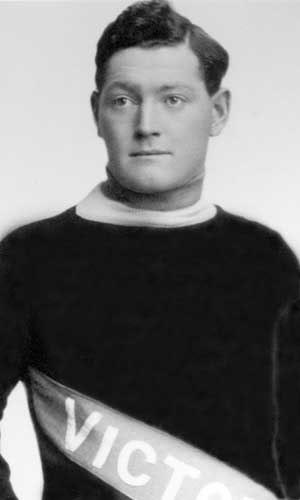
- Prodgers with the Victoria Aristocrats in the 1912–13 PCHA season
- Born: February 18, 1891 London, Ontario, Canada
- Died: October 25, 1935 (aged 44) London, Ontario, Canada
- Height: 5 ft 10 in (178 cm)
- Weight: 180 lb (82 kg; 12 st 12 lb)
- Position: Centre/Defence
- Shot: Right
- Played for: Quebec Bulldogs; Victoria Aristocrats; Montreal Wanderers; Montreal Canadiens; Toronto 228th Battalion; Toronto St. Patricks; Hamilton Tigers
- Playing career: 1908–1925

Samuel George "Goldie" Prodger (often misspelled Prodger) (February 18, 1891 – October 25, 1935) was a Canadian ice hockey player. During his career he played for the Waterloo Colts, Quebec Bulldogs, Victoria Aristocrats, Montreal Wanderers, Montreal Canadiens, Toronto 228th Battalion, Toronto St. Pats, and Hamilton Tigers. He won the Stanley Cup in 1912 with the Bulldogs, and in 1916 with the Canadiens, and retired in 1925.

== Playing career ==
George Prodger was born in London, Ontario, and played amateur hockey for the London Athletics, joining its junior team in 1908, and graduating to their intermediate team for the 1909–10 season. He turned professional for the Waterloo Colts of the Ontario Professional Hockey League for the 1910–11 season. When Waterloo folded its team, Prodger, along with Eddie Oatman and Jack McDonald joined the Quebec Bulldogs of the National Hockey Association (NHA). The Bulldogs won the NHA championship and the Stanley Cup and defeated Moncton in a Stanley Cup challenge series.

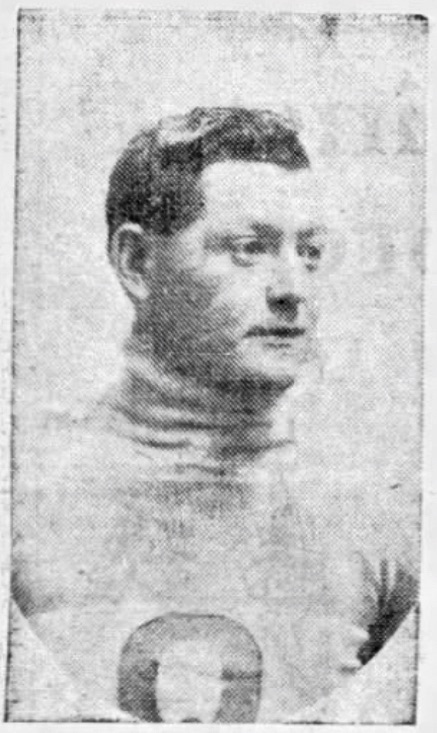
1911–12 season with Quebec

Prodgers joined the Victoria Aristocrats for the 1912–13 season despite still being under contract with Quebec. He returned to Quebec for one season, before joining the Montreal Wanderers for a season and a season with the Montreal Canadiens. While playing for the Canadiens, the Canadiens went to its first Stanley Cup Final, winning the series on a goal by Prodgers.

He enlisted with the Canadian Expeditionary Force and played for the Toronto 228th Battalion for the last NHA season (1916–17) before being shipped overseas. He returned to Canada in 1919 but refused to report to Quebec which was assigned his playing rights in the new National Hockey League (NHL). He was traded between several teams before he settled in with the new Toronto St. Patricks. After that one season with Toronto, he joined the Hamilton Tigers where he had his best offensive seasons, scoring 18 goals in 1920–21. He stayed with the Tigers until the end of the 1924–25 season. The Tigers were suspended at the end of the season after a player's strike and their contracts were sold to the New York Americans. Prodgers retired at that point, But after a season away, he joined the London Panthers of the Canadian Professional League, whom he would coach in the following season.

== Post-playing career ==
He died on October 25, 1935, in London, Ontario.

== Career statistics ==
=== Regular season and playoffs ===
			Regular season					Playoffs
Season	Team	League	GP	G	A	Pts	PIM	GP	G	A	Pts	PIM
1908–09	London Athletics	OHA Jr	—	—	—	—	—	—	—	—	—	—
1909–10	London Wingers	OHA Int	—	—	—	—	—	—	—	—	—	—
1910–11	Waterloo Colts	OPHL	16	9	0	9	—	1	0	0	0	—
1911–12	Quebec Bulldogs	NHA	18	3	0	3	15	—	—	—	—	—
1911–12	Quebec Bulldogs	St-Cup	—	—	—	—	—	2	0	0	0	0
1912–13	Victoria Aristocrats	PCHA	15	6	0	6	21	—	—	—	—	—
1912–13	Victoria Aristocrats	Exhib	3	1	0	1	0	—	—	—	—	—
1913–14	Quebec Bulldogs	NHA	20	2	3	5	11	—	—	—	—	—
1914–15	Montreal Wanderers	NHA	18	8	5	13	54	2	0	0	0	15
1915–16	Montreal Canadiens	NHA	24	8	3	11	86	—	—	—	—	—
1915–16	Montreal Canadiens	St-Cup	—	—	—	—	—	4	3	0	3	13
1916–17	Toronto 228th Battalion	NHA	12	16	3	19	30	—	—	—	—	—
1919–20	Toronto St. Pats	NHL	16	8	6	14	4	—	—	—	—	—
1920–21	Hamilton Tigers	NHL	24	18	9	27	8	—	—	—	—	—
1921–22	Hamilton Tigers	NHL	24	15	6	21	4	—	—	—	—	—
1922–23	Hamilton Tigers	NHL	23	13	4	17	17	—	—	—	—	—
1923–24	Hamilton Tigers	NHL	23	9	4	13	6	—	—	—	—	—
1924–25	Hamilton Tigers	NHL	1	0	0	0	0	—	—	—	—	—
1926–27	London Panthers	Can-Pro	16	1	0	1	10	—	—	—	—	—
1927–28	London Panthers	Can-Pro	—	—	—	—	—	—	—	—	—	—
NHA totals			92	37	14	51	196	2	0	0	0	0
NHL totals			111	63	29	82	39	—	—	—	—	—

== Transactions ==
- Signed as a free agent by Waterloo (OPHL), January 5, 1911.
- Signed as a free agent by Quebec (NHA), November 1911.
- Signed by Victoria (PCHA) after jumping contract with Quebec (NHA), November 18, 1912.
- Traded to Montreal Wanderers (NHA) by Quebec (NHA) for cash, December 4, 1914.
- NHL rights were transferred to Quebec by the NHL when the Quebec franchise returned to NHL, November 25, 1919.
- Suspended by Quebec after refusing to report to training camp, November 27, 1919.
- Traded to Montreal by Quebec for Ed Carpenter, December 21, 1919.
- Traded to Toronto by Montreal for Harry Cameron, January 14, 1920.
- Traded to Montreal by Toronto with Joe Matte for Harry Cameron, November 27, 1920.
- Traded to Hamilton by Montreal with Jack Coughlin, Joe Matte and loan of Billy Coutu for 1920–21 season for Harry Mummery, Jack McDonald and Dave Ritchie, November 27, 1920.

== Awards ==
- Played on the OHA-Jr. first All-Star Team (1909)
- Inducted into the London Sports Hall of Fame (November 2009)
