= 1920–21 Ottawa Senators season =

National Hockey League team season

1920–21 Ottawa Senators
- Stanley Cup champions
- O'Brien Trophy winners
- 1920–21 record: 8–2–0 (1st half); 6–8–0 (2nd half)
- Home record: 8–4–0
- Road record: 6–6–0
- Goals for: 97
- Goals against: 75

Team information
- General manager: Tommy Gorman
- Coach: Pete Green
- Captain: Eddie Gerard
- Arena: The Arena

Team leaders
- Goals: Cy Denneny (34)
- Assists: Jack MacKell (10)
- Points: Cy Denneny (39)
- Penalty minutes: Buck Boucher (43)
- Wins: Clint Benedict (14)
- Goals against average: Clint Benedict (3.08)

The 1920–21 Ottawa Senators season was the club's 36th season of play, fourth season in the NHL, and they were out to defend their 1920 Stanley Cup championship. The club would win the NHL championship and defeat Vancouver in the Stanley Cup Final to win the club's ninth Stanley Cup.

== Regular season ==
Cy Denneny led the club offensively, scoring 34 goals, which was the second-highest total in the NHL, and his 39 points ranked him third in the entire league. Denneny had a six-goal game against the Hamilton Tigers on March 7.

Frank Nighbor had another great season with 18 goals, and Georges Boucher provided the team toughness, leading the club with 43 penalty minutes.

Clint Benedict also had a great season, earning 14 wins and a league-best GAA of 3.08.

The team started the season 8–2–0 and won the first half of the season and a spot in the O'Brien Cup finals, but the Senators slumped to a 6–8–0 record in the second half leading to a playoff with the Toronto St. Patricks in a two-game total-goals series.

On December 30, 1920, the Senators were ordered to give up Sprague Cleghorn to Toronto, on the orders of the league. The league ruled that the Senators were over the total salary limit for players and Cleghorn was ordered to report to Toronto. The same day, the league ruled that Punch Broadbent would have to go to Hamilton to complete a trade made before the season, still uncompleted. Both players refused to report to their new teams. Cleghorn eventually reported to Toronto, but returned to Ottawa in time to play in the playoffs. Broadbent resumed play for Ottawa in the second half of the season.

=== December ===
- **December 22** – The Senators opened the 1920–21 season on home ice against the Toronto St. Patricks. Jack Darragh scored three goals and Cy Denneny scored twice as Ottawa defeated Toronto 6–3.
- **December 27** – The newly relocated Hamilton Tigers made their first ever trip to Ottawa. Darragh scored two more goals for the Senators, while Clint Benedict played very solid in goal, as Ottawa defeated the Tigers 3–1.
- **December 29** – Ottawa played their first road of the season at Mutual Street Arena in Toronto against the St. Patricks. Denneny scored two goals and added an assist, while Georges Boucher and Cleghorn each scored twice, as the Senators blew out the St. Patricks by a score of 8–1.

The Senators finished December with a perfect 3–0–0 record, earning six points. They were in first place in the NHL, two points ahead of second place Hamilton.

=== January ===
- **January 3** – The Senators were back on home ice for a matchup against the Montreal Canadiens. Denneny led the Senators, scoring three goals and an assist, while Jack MacKell scored twice, as Ottawa crushed the Canadiens 8–1 to remain perfect on the season with a 4–0–0 record.
- **January 6** – Ottawa was on the road for their first ever trip to Barton Street Arena in Hamilton for a game against the Tigers. Nighbor scored twice and added two assists, while Denneny scored two goals and had an assist, as the Senators defeated the Tigers 5–1.
- **January 8** – The Senators continued their road trip for their first visit to Mount Royal Arena in the season to face the Montreal Canadiens. Nighbor scored twice, however, the Canadiens, led by Newsy Lalonde who scored two goals and added two assists, snapped the Senators winning streak at five, as Montreal defeated Ottawa 5–4.
- **January 12** – Ottawa returned home for a matchup against the Montreal Canadiens in the back end of a home-and-home series. The game remained scoreless until midway through the third period, as Darragh and Eddie Gerard each scored, while Benedict earned the shutout, as the Senators defeated Montreal 2–0.
- **January 15** – The Senators were back on the road for a matchup against the Toronto St. Patricks. Nighbor scored three goals for the Senators to lead the team to a 5–2 win over Toronto.
- **January 19** – Ottawa returned home for a game against the Hamilton Tigers. Boucher and Nighbor each scored two goals, with Nighbor's second goal the overtime winner, as the Senators defeated Hamilton 4–3, to improve to 8–1–0 on the season, and earn a berth into the O'Brien Cup finals as they clinched first place for the first half of the season.
- **January 21** – The Senators concluded the first half of the regular season with a home game against the Toronto St. Patricks. Cy Denneny scored two goals, however, his younger brother, Corb Denneny, scored the overtime winning goal for the St. Patricks as Toronto defeated Ottawa 5–4. With the loss, Ottawa finished the first half of the season with a league-best record of 8–2–0.
- **January 26** – Ottawa opened the second half of the regular season with a road game against the Montreal Canadiens. Ottawa took a 3–0 lead midway through the game, however, the Canadiens stormed back to win the game 5–3. Boucher, Gerard and Nighbor each scored for the Senators.
- **January 29** – The Senators continued their road trip with a matchup against the Hamilton Tigers. Nighbor and Cy Denneny each score a goal, while Benedict provided strong goaltending, as the Senators defeated the Tigers 2–1 for their first victory in the second half of the season.

At the end of January, the Senators had a 1–1–0 record in the second half of the season, earning two points. The Senators were in a tie for second place with the St. Patricks, two points behind the first place Canadiens.

=== February ===
- **February 2** – Ottawa returned to home ice for their first home game of the second half of the season against the Toronto St. Patricks. Cy Denneny scored twice and added an assist, as the Senators erased a 2–0 deficit to defeat the St. Patricks 4–3.
- **February 5** – Ottawa was back on the road for a matchup against the Hamilton Tigers. The Senators, led by Gerard and his two goals and an assist, and by Morley Bruce with his two goals, crushed the Tigers by a score of 7–3.
- **February 9** – The Senators and Hamilton Tigers faced off back in Ottawa for the second game of a home-and-home series. Ottawa, led by three goals from Cy Denneny and two goals by Gerard, defeated the Tigers 7–4, extending their winning streak to four games.
- **February 12** – Ottawa welcomed the Montreal Canadiens for a home game. Darragh was the only Senator to manage a goal, as the Canadiens, led by goaltender Georges Vezina, defeated Ottawa 3–1.
- **February 16** – The Senators were on the road for a game against the Toronto St. Patricks. Ottawa took a 3–2 lead into the third period, however, Toronto scored twice to win the game 4–3. Cy Denneny scored all three goals for the Senators.
- **February 19** – Ottawa continued their road trip with a game against the Montreal Canadiens. The struggling Senators managed only one goal, scored by Cy Denneny, as the Canadiens pummeled Ottawa 8–1. The loss was the Senators third in a row, dropping their record to 4–4–0 in the second half of the season.
- **February 23** – The Montreal Canadiens visited Ottawa for the backend of a home-and-home series. The Senators offense continued to struggle, as Nighbor scored the lone goal, as the Canadiens defeated Ottawa 3–1.
- **February 26** – Ottawa headed to Toronto for a road game against the Toronto St. Patricks. Gerard scored a goal and added an assist, however, the Senators struggles continued, as the St. Patricks won the game 4–2. The loss was Ottawa's fifth in a row.
- **February 28** – The Senators continued their road trip with a game against the Hamilton Tigers. Cy Denneny scored a goal and an assist, but the Tigers easily handled the Senators, winning the game 6–2 and extending Ottawa's losing skid to six games.

Ottawa struggled to a record of 3–6–0 in February. Overall, the Senators second half record at this time was 4–7–0, earning eight points and third place in the NHL.

=== March ===
- **March 2** – The Senators returned home for a matchup against the Toronto St. Patricks. Ottawa continued to struggle, as Cy Denneny and his two goals were all of the Senators offense, as the St. Patricks defeated Ottawa 3–2. The loss was the seventh in a row for the Senators.
- **March 5** – Ottawa headed to Montreal for their final road game of the season against the Montreal Canadiens. Cy Denneny scored a late third period goal, while Benedict stopped every shot fired his way, as Ottawa snapped their seven-game losing streak with a 1–0 victory.
- **March 7** – Ottawa concluded the 1920–21 regular season with a home game against the Hamilton Tigers. The Senators offense, which had been struggling, exploded in this game, as Ottawa defeated the Tigers 12–5. Cy Denneny scored six goals and added an assist, while Punch Broadbent and Nighbor each scored twice.

Ottawa finished the second half of the season with a disappointing record of 6–8–0, earning 12 and ranking third in the NHL, eight points behind the first place Toronto St. Patricks.

=== Final standings ===
First half
	GP	W	L	T	Pts	GF	GA
**Ottawa Senators**	10	8	2	0	**16**	49	23
Toronto St. Patricks	10	5	5	0	**10**	39	47
Montreal Canadiens	10	4	6	0	**8**	37	51
Hamilton Tigers	10	3	7	0	**6**	34	38

Second half
	GP	W	L	T	Pts	GF	GA
**Toronto St. Patricks**	14	10	4	0	**20**	66	53
Montreal Canadiens	14	9	5	0	**18**	75	48
Ottawa Senators	14	6	8	0	**12**	48	52
Hamilton Tigers	14	3	11	0	**6**	58	94

Note: W = Wins, L = Losses, T = Ties, GF= Goals For, GA = Goals Against, Pts = Points
Note: Teams that qualified for playoffs highlighted in bold.

=== Record vs. opponents ===
1920–21 NHL Records
Team	HAM	MTL	OTT	TOR
Hamilton	—	3–5	1–7	2–6
Montreal	5–3	—	5–3	3–5
Ottawa	7–1	3–5	—	4–4
Toronto	6–2	5–3	4–4	—

== Playoffs ==
=== Ottawa Senators 7, Toronto St. Patricks 0 ===
In the NHL Championship, the Senators faced the Toronto St. Patricks in a two-game total-goal series with one game in each city.

The series opened on March 10 in Ottawa. The teams skated to a scoreless first period. In the second period, Ottawa opened the scoring on a powerplay goal by Cy Denneny 1:45 into the period, giving the Senators a 1–0 lead. The Sens added a second goal less than five minutes later, as Boucher scored to make it 2–0 Ottawa after two periods. The Senators continued to dominate in the third period, as they scored three goals, including two by Boucher, giving him three goals in the game, as the Senators shutout the St. Patricks 5–0 to take the series lead.

The series resumed four nights later in Toronto on March 14. The Senators played tight defense, and the game remained goalless after two periods. In the third period, Ottawa's Gerard scored the opening goal of the game, giving the Senators 1–0 lead. Four minutes later, Nighbor scored, giving the team a 2–0 lead. Ottawa would win the series by a score of 7–0, advancing to the 1921 Stanley Cup Final.

=== Ottawa Senators 3, Vancouver Millionaires 2 ===
The series would take place in Vancouver at Denman Arena, and a record breaking crowd of 11,000 people would see the Millionaires win the first game 2–1 to take an early series lead. The Senators would rebound, winning the next two before Vancouver would tie the series up at two with a win in game four. Then, for the second straight year, the Senators would win the fifth and deciding game, winning the 1921 Stanley Cup, and became the first team since the 1912 and 1913 Quebec Bulldogs to win back-to-back Stanley Cup Championships.

All of the contests in the series, which went to the full five games, were decided by only one goal. The Millionaires won games one and four with victories of 2–1 and 3–2, respectively. The Senators were victorious in games two and three with 4–3 and 3–2 wins. Then in the fifth game, Darragh scored both of Ottawa's goals in the 2–1 victory to clinch the Cup.

Darragh led the Senators in scoring with five goals during the series, while goaltender Benedict only allowed just 12 goals in the five games, earning a 2.40 goals-against average.

== Schedule and results ==
=== Regular season ===
1920–21 regular season
First half: 8–2–0 (home: 5–1–0; road: 3–1–0)

Game	Date	Visitor	Score	Home	OT	Decision	Attendance	Arena	Record	Pts	Recap
1	December 22	Toronto	3–6	Ottawa		Benedict	N/A	The Arena	1–0–0	2	
2	December 27	Hamilton	1–3	Ottawa		Benedict	N/A	The Arena	2–0–0	4	
3	December 29	Ottawa	8–1	Toronto		Benedict	N/A	Arena Gardens	3–0–0	6	
4	January 3	Montreal	2–8	Ottawa		Benedict	N/A	The Arena	4–0–0	8	
5	January 6	Ottawa	5–1	Hamilton		Benedict	N/A	Barton Street Arena	5–0–0	10	
6	January 8	Ottawa	4–5	Montreal		Benedict	N/A	Mount Royal Arena	5–1–0	10	
7	January 12	Montreal	0–2	Ottawa		Benedict	N/A	The Arena	6–1–0	12	
8	January 15	Ottawa	5–2	Toronto		Benedict	N/A	Arena Gardens	7–1–0	14	
9	January 19	Hamilton	3–4	Ottawa		Benedict	N/A	The Arena	8–1–0	16	
10	January 22	Toronto	5–4	Ottawa	OT	Benedict	N/A	The Arena	8–2–0	16	

Second half: 6–8–0 (home: 3–3–0; road: 3–5–0)

Game	Date	Visitor	Score	Home	OT	Decision	Attendance	Arena	Record	Pts	Recap
1	January 26	Ottawa	3–5	Montreal		Benedict	N/A	Mount Royal Arena	0–1–0	0	
2	January 29	Ottawa	2–1	Hamilton		Benedict	N/A	Barton Street Arena	1–1–0	2	
3	February 2	Toronto	3–4	Ottawa		Benedict	N/A	The Arena	2–1–0	4	
4	February 5	Ottawa	7–3	Hamilton		Benedict	N/A	Barton Street Arena	3–1–0	6	
5	February 9	Hamilton	4–7	Ottawa		Benedict	N/A	The Arena	4–1–0	8	
6	February 12	Montreal	3–1	Ottawa		Benedict	N/A	The Arena	4–2–0	8	
7	February 16	Ottawa	3–4	Toronto		Benedict	N/A	Arena Gardens	4–3–0	8	
8	February 19	Ottawa	1–8	Montreal		Benedict	N/A	Mount Royal Arena	4–4–0	8	
9	February 23	Montreal	3–1	Ottawa		Benedict	N/A	The Arena	4–5–0	8	
10	February 26	Ottawa	2–4	Toronto		Benedict	N/A	Arena Gardens	4–6–0	8	
11	February 28	Ottawa	2–6	Hamilton		Benedict	N/A	Barton Street Arena	4–7–0	8	
12	March 2	Toronto	3–2	Ottawa		Benedict	N/A	The Arena	4–8–0	8	
13	March 5	Ottawa	1–0	Montreal		Benedict	N/A	Mount Royal Arena	5–8–0	10	
14	March 7	Hamilton	5–12	Ottawa		Benedict	N/A	The Arena	6–8–0	12	

Legend: Win (2 points) Loss (0 points) Tie (1 point)

=== Playoffs ===
1921 Stanley Cup playoffs
NHL championship vs. Toronto St. Patricks – Senators win 7 goals to 0 goals

Game	Date	Visitor	Score	Home	OT	Decision	Attendance	Arena	Series
1	March 10	Toronto	0–5	Ottawa		Benedict	N/A	The Arena	0–5
2	March 14	Ottawa	2–0	Toronto		Benedict	N/A	Arena Gardens	0–7

Stanley Cup Final vs. Vancouver Millionaires – Senators win 3–2

Game	Date	Visitor	Score	Home	OT	Decision	Attendance	Arena	Series
1	March 21	Ottawa	1–3	Vancouver		Benedict	N/A	Denman Arena	0–1
2	March 24	Ottawa	4–3	Vancouver		Benedict	N/A	Denman Arena	1–1
3	March 27	Ottawa	3–2	Vancouver		Benedict	N/A	Denman Arena	2–1
4	March 31	Ottawa	2–3	Vancouver		Benedict	N/A	Denman Arena	2–2
5	April 4	Ottawa	2–1	Vancouver		Benedict	N/A	Denman Arena	3–2

Legend: Win Loss Tie

== Player statistics ==
=== Scoring leaders ===
Player	GP	G	A	Pts	PIM
Cy Denneny	24	34	5	39	10
Frank Nighbor	24	18	3	21	10
Jack Darragh	24	11	8	19	20
Buck Boucher	23	12	5	17	43
Eddie Gerard	24	11	4	15	18

=== Goaltending ===
Player	GP	TOI	W	L	T	GA	SO	GAA
Clint Benedict	24	1462	14	10	0	75	2	3.08

Note:

Pos = Position;GP = Games played; G = Goals; A = Assists; Pts = Points; PIM = Penalty minutes; +/- = Plus/minus; PPG = Power-play goals; SHG = Short-handed goals; GWG = Game-winning goals
Pos = Position;GP = Games played; Min, TOI = Minutes played; W = Wins; L = Losses; T,T/OT = Ties; OTL = Overtime losses; GA = Goals-against; GAA = Goals-against average; SO = Shutouts; SA = Shots against; SV = Shots saved;SV% = Save percentage;

== Transactions ==
The Senators were involved in the following transactions during the 1920–21 season.

=== Trades ===
December 30, 1920	To Ottawa Senators N/A	To Hamilton Tigers Sprague Cleghorn; Punch Broadbent
February 21, 1921	To Ottawa Senators Punch Broadbent	To Montreal Canadiens N/A
April 6, 1921	To Ottawa Senators N/A	To Hamilton Tigers Sprague Cleghorn

=== Free agents ===
November 10, 1920	Did not play in 1919–20 Leth Graham
March 15, 1921	From Toronto St. Patricks Sprague Cleghorn

== See also ==
- 1920–21 NHL season
