= 1918 Stanley Cup Final =

1918 ice hockey championship series

	1	2	3	4	5	Total
Toronto (NHL)	5	4	6	1	2	3
Vancouver Millionaires (PCHA)	3	6	3	8	1	2
- Location(s): Toronto: Arena Gardens
- Format: best-of-five
- Coaches: Toronto: Dick Carroll; Vancouver: Frank Patrick
- Dates: March 20–30, 1918
- Series-winning goal: Corb Denneny (10:30, third)
- Hall of Famers: Toronto: Jack Adams (1959); Harry Cameron (1963); Rusty Crawford (1963); Hap Holmes (1972); Reg Noble (1962); Millionaires: Si Griffis (1950); Hughie Lehman (1958); Mickey MacKay (1952); Barney Stanley (1963); Cyclone Taylor (1947); Coaches: Frank Patrick (1950)

The 1918 Stanley Cup Final was contested by the National Hockey League (NHL) champion Toronto and the Pacific Coast Hockey Association (PCHA) champion Vancouver Millionaires. In a series held entirely in Toronto, the Toronto team won the series by three games to two in the best-of-five game series to win the Stanley Cup. It was the first series contested by the new NHL and subsequently the first Stanley Cup win by the team that is now the Toronto Maple Leafs. This was the first major professional sports championship ever won by a Toronto-based team.

== Paths to the Final ==
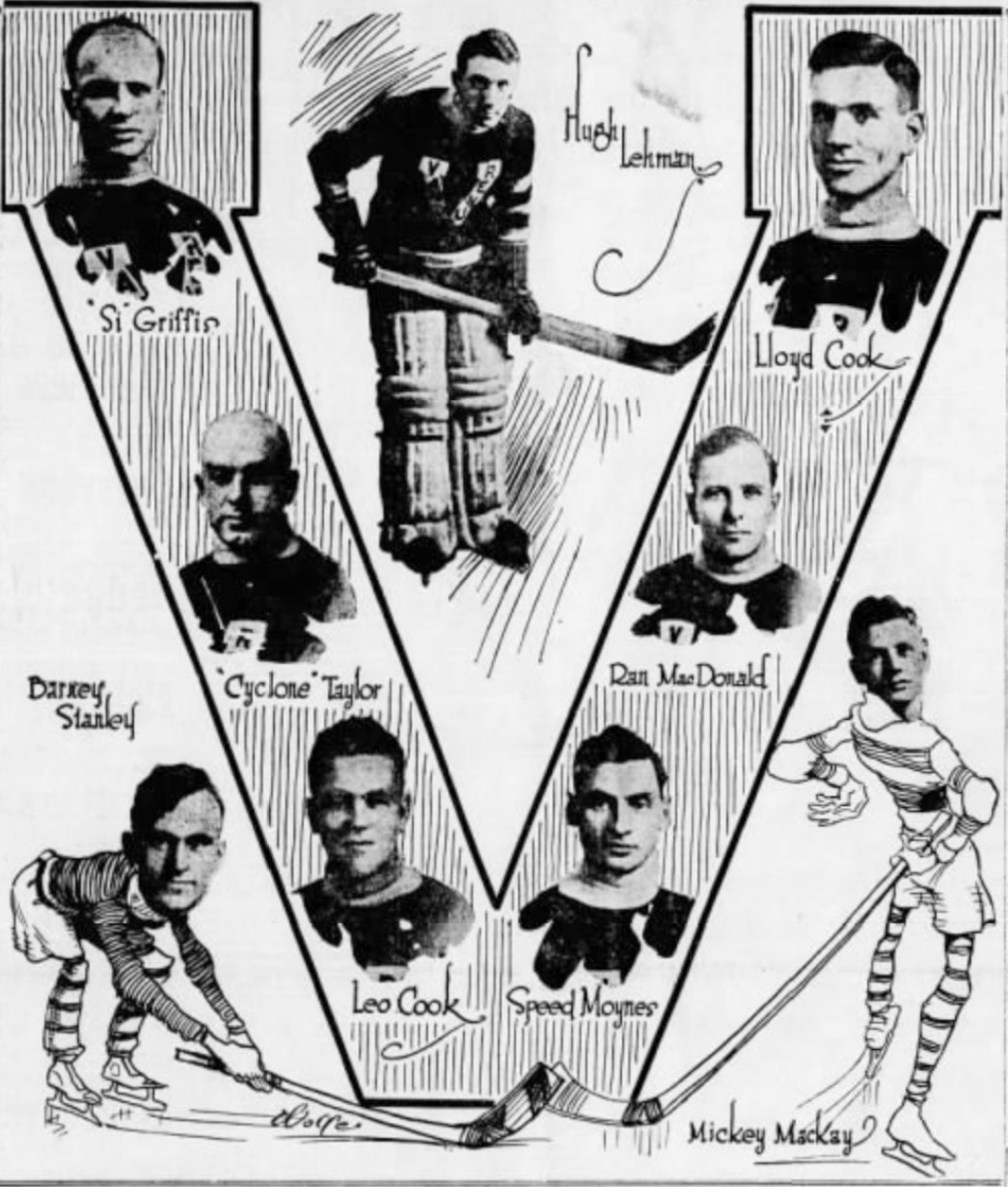
The Vancouver Millionaires during the 1917–18 PCHA season.

Prior to the 1917–18 season, the National Hockey Association (NHA) had suspended operations as the result of a power play to oust Toronto Blueshirts owner Eddie Livingstone. The remaining clubs then met in November 1917 to form the NHL, using the same constitution and playing rules of the NHA. The NHL took the NHA's place in competing for the Cup in a playoff series with the Pacific Coast Hockey Association.

The Toronto NHL players were assigned from the Toronto NHA franchise, and played for a 'temporary' Toronto NHL franchise, operated by the Toronto Arena owners. This is why it is often retroactively called the 'Arenas' although no hockey club with the official name "Arenas" existed until after the 1917–18 season. The team at the time used no nickname; it was often referred to at the time as the "Blueshirts", the nickname of the NHA franchise, as it was announced by the NHA that the franchise had been sold, although Eddie Livingstone had not agreed to this as he wanted to resume his franchise or be compensated under his terms.

Toronto won the second half of the split regular season, while the Montreal Canadiens won the first half. Toronto then won the NHL title by defeating the Canadiens in a two-game, total-goals series, 10–7.

Meanwhile, Vancouver finished the 1917–18 PCHA regular season in second place with a 9–9 record behind the 11–7 Seattle Metropolitans. However, Vancouver beat Seattle in that league's two-game, total-goals finals, 3–2, with a 1–0 game two victory.

== Game summaries ==
As with the three previous NHA-PCHA Cup Final series, the series alternated between the NHL champion and the PCHA champion each year, while the differing rules for the leagues alternated each game. This meant that all of the games for the 1918 championship series were played at Toronto's Arena Gardens.

Two of the major differences between the two leagues' rules proved to be a major factor in the series. The PCHA allowed forward passing (adopted in the 1913–14 season) and played with seven players per side; the NHL did not adopt forward passing until the following season, and only played with six players. In every game, the winner was the one playing under its league's rules. The Torontos won games one and three with victories of 5–3 and 6–3, and the Millionaires recorded 6–4 and 8–1 wins in games two and four. Because game five was played under NHL rules, it helped Toronto's Corbett Denneny to score the series-winning goal in a 2–1 victory. The Torontos outscored the Millionaires by a combined total of 13–7 in the three games played under NHL rules. Conversely, Vancouver recorded a 14–5 margin in the games under PCHA rules.

Toronto goaltender Hap Holmes recorded a 4.20 goals-against average during the series, while Alf Skinner led Toronto with eight goals. Cyclone Taylor scored nine goals for Vancouver.

March 20	Vancouver Millionaires	3–5	Toronto Hockey Club	Arena Gardens	Recap
16:00 – Cyclone Taylor (1); 17:00 – Cyclone Taylor (2)		First period	Reg Noble (2) – 08:00; Harry Meeking (4) – 10:00; Reg Noble (3) – 11:00; Alf Skinner (1) – 19:50
10:00 – Mickey MacKay (1)		Second period	Alf Skinner (2) – 13:00
No scoring		Third period	No scoring
Hugh Lehman		Goalie stats	Hap Holmes

March 23	Toronto Hockey Club	4–6	Vancouver Millionaires	Arena Gardens	Recap
Alf Skinner (3) – 17:00		First period	18:00 – Cyclone Taylor (3)
Harry Cameron (2) 16:00		Second period	02:00 – Cyclone Taylor (4); 06:00 – Mickey MacKay (2); 14:00 – Mickey MacKay (3)
Alf Skinner (4) – 08:00; Alf Skinner (5) – 16:00		Third period	06:00 – Si Griffis (1); 10:00 – Mickey MacKay (3)
Hap Holmes		Goalie stats	Hugh Lehman

March 26	Vancouver Millionaires	3–6	Toronto Hockey Club	Arena Gardens	Recap
No scoring		First period	05:00 – Harry Cameron (3); 08:00 – Alf Skinner (6); 13:00 – Corb Denneny (1)
Ran McDonald (1) – pp – 06:00; Cyclone Taylor (5) – 16:00		Second period	11:00 – Harry Cameron (4); 14:00 – Corb Denneny (2)
Cyclone Taylor (6) – 03:00		Third period	13:00 – Alf Skinner (7)
Hugh Lehman		Goalie stats	Hap Holmes

March 28	Toronto Hockey Club	1–8	Vancouver Millionaires	Arena Gardens	Recap
No scoring		First period	05:00 – Cyclone Taylor (7)
Ken Randall (1) – 04:26		Second period	04:00 – Barney Stanley (1); 11:06 – Mickey MacKay (5); 13:06 – Barney Stanley (2)
No scoring		Third period	06:00 – Cyclone Taylor (8); 13:00 – pp – Lloyd Cook (1); 13:45 – pp – Ran MacDonald (2); 15:00 – pp – Lloyd Cook (2)
Hap Holmes		Goalie stats	Hugh Lehman

March 30	Vancouver Millionaires	1–2	Toronto Hockey Club	Arena Gardens	Recap
No scoring		First period	No scoring
No scoring		Second period	No scoring
Cyclone Taylor (9) – 09:30		Third period	00:30 – Alf Skinner (8); 10:30 – Corb Denneny (3)
Hugh Lehman		Goalie stats	Hap Holmes

Toronto won series 3–2

== Player stats ==
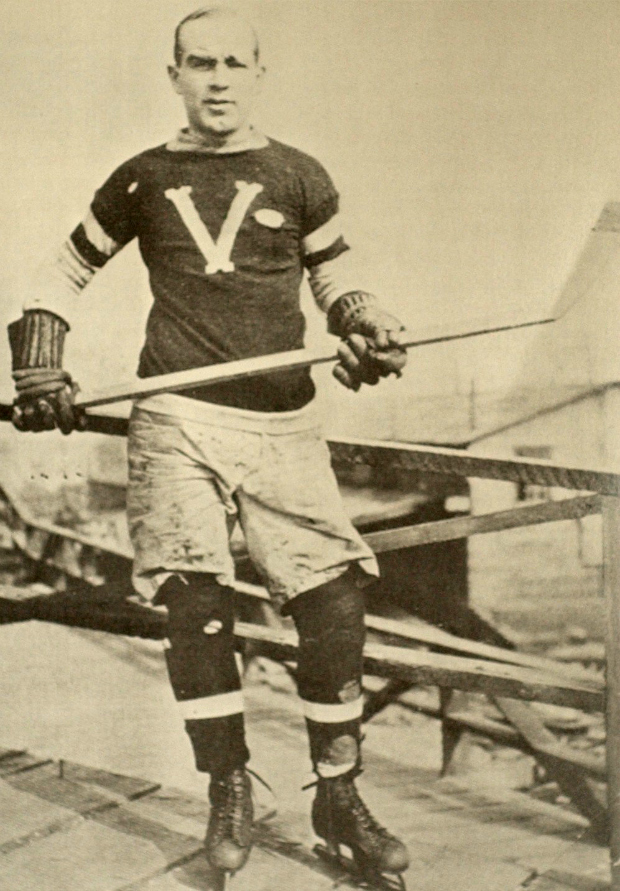
Cyclone Taylor of Vancouver scored nine goals during the series, the most of any player.

Toronto	GP	G	A	PTS	PIM
Alf Skinner	5	8	2	10	18
Harry Mummery	5	0	6	6	21
Harry Cameron	5	3	1	4	12
Corb Denneny	5	3	1	4	0
Reg Noble	5	2	1	3	12
Harry Meeking	5	1	2	3	18
Ken Randall	5	1	0	1	21

Goaltender	GP	W	L	Min	GA	SO	Avg
Hap Holmes	5	3	2	300	21	0	4.20

Vancouver	GP	G	A	PTS	PIM
Mickey MacKay	5	5	5	10	12
Cyclone Taylor	5	9	0	9	15
Ran McDonald	5	2	2	4	9
Lloyd Cook	5	2	0	2	12
Barney Stanley	5	2	0	2	6
Si Griffis	5	1	0	1	9
Leo Cook	5	0	0	0	6
Speed Moynes	5	0	0	0	6

Goaltender	GP	W	L	Min	GA	SO	Avg
Hugh Lehman	5	2	3	300	18	0	3.60

== Stanley Cup engraving ==
The 1918 Stanley Cup was presented by the trophy's trustee William Foran. Toronto never did engrave their name on the Cup for their championship season.

It was not until the trophy was redesigned in 1948 that the words "1918 Toronto Arenas" was put onto its then-new collar.

The following Toronto players and staff were members of the Stanley Cup winning team.

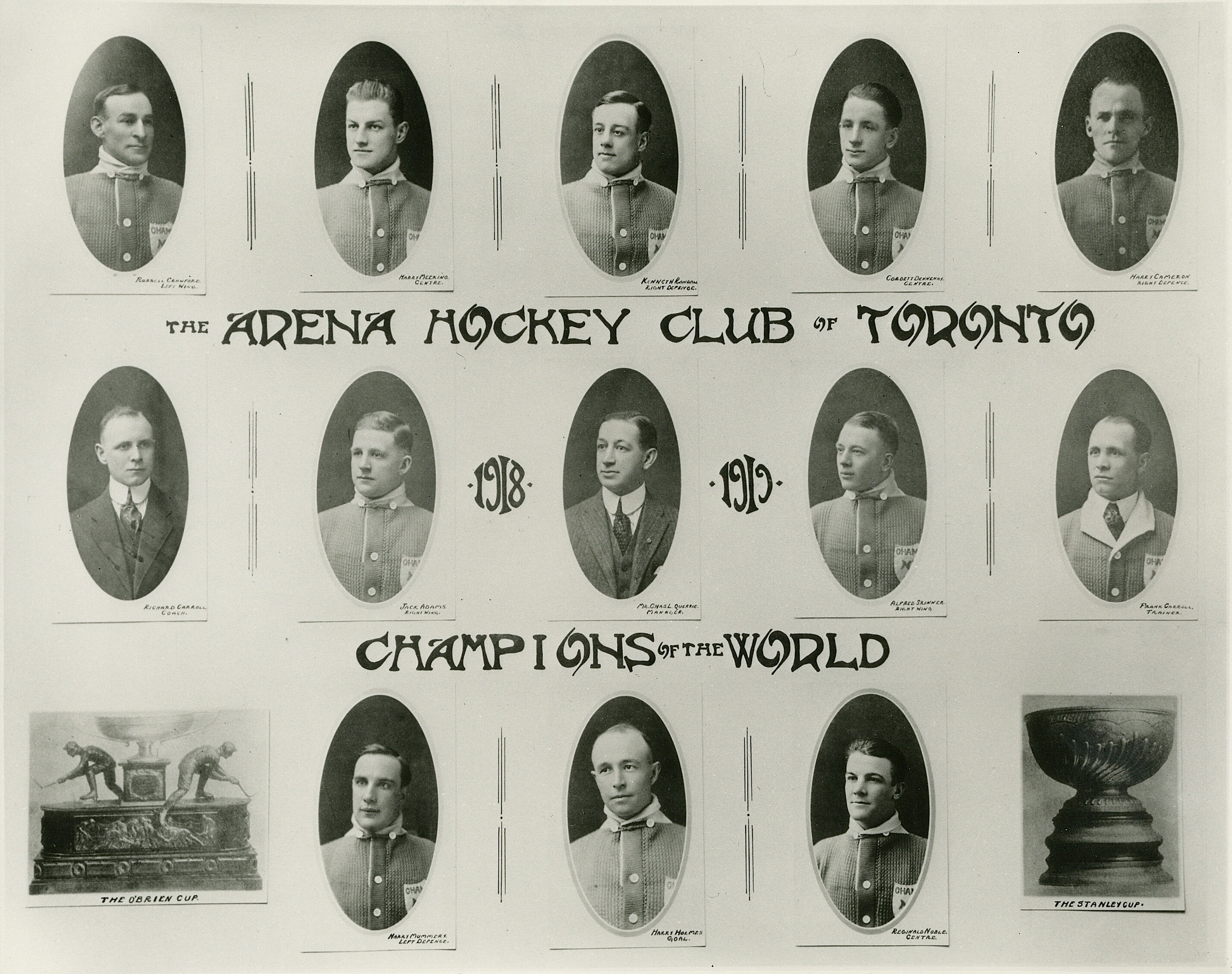
1917–18 season Toronto Arenas. Top row, from left: Rusty Crawford, Harry Meeking, Ken Randall, Corbett Denneny, Harry Cameron. Middle row, from left: Dick Carroll, Jack Adams, Charles Querrie, Alf Skinner, Frank Carroll. Bottom row, from left: Harry Mummery, Harry "Hap" Holmes, Reg Noble.

1917–18 Toronto Arenas

=== Players ===
Centres

- 4 Reg Noble‡
- 5 Corb Denneny
- 9 Jack Adams

Wingers

- 6 Alf "Dutch" Skinner
- 8 Rusty Crawford
- 7 Jack Coughlin†
- 10 Harry Meeking
- 12 Jack Marks†

Defencemen

- 2 Harry Cameron
- 3 Ken Randall‡ (captain)
- 11-7 Harry Mummery

Goaltenders

- 31-1 Harry Hap Holmes

=== Coaching and administrative staff ===
- Charlie Querrie (President/Manager), Dick Carroll (Coach)
- Frank Carroll (Trainer)

‡ Played rover position in the Stanley Cup Final
† Missing from team picture.

=== Stanley Cup engraving ===
Although the Vancouver team was not the winner of the series, the Vancouver club had the words "Vancouver/Defeated Seattle/1917–18/Score 1–0" engraved on the Cup after winning the PCHA championship over the Metropolitans, who won the previous year's Cup Final. This was consistent with the practice at that time of the trophy being officially passed on to the winner of the league championship of the previous Cup champion's league.

The Toronto club never did engrave their name on the Cup to memorialize their series victory over Vancouver. At the time, the NHL club was in a dispute with the owner of the NHA Toronto franchise holder over the Stanley Cup revenues. In 1948, the NHL engraved "1918 Toronto Arenas" on the Cup.

Dick Carroll was not only the first NHL coach to win the Stanley Cup in his first NHL season, but he was also a rookie coach.

== See also ==
- 1917–18 NHL season
- 1917–18 PCHA season

Preceded by Seattle Metropolitans; 1917	Toronto; Stanley Cup champions 1918	Succeeded by (no champion for 1919)
