= Frank Carroll (ice hockey) =

Canadian ice hockey player, coach (1879–1938)

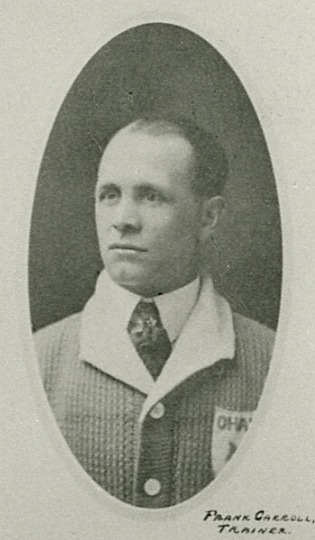
- Carroll in the 1917–18 season.
- Born: Peter Francis Carroll; December 20, 1879; Guelph, Ontario, Canada
- Died: June 24, 1938 (aged 58); Birchcliff, Ontario, Canada
- Occupation: Ice hockey coach

Peter Francis "Frank" Carroll (December 20, 1879 – June 24, 1938) was a Canadian ice hockey player and coach. During his coaching career, his teams won at the highest levels of junior, senior and professional hockey, including two Stanley Cup championships.

== Coaching career ==
In 1913–14, Carroll served as assistant trainer/assistant coach, alongside his trainer/coach brother Dick, with the professional National Hockey Association's Toronto Hockey Club (a.k.a., in media of the day, as both the Torontos and the Blueshirts), winning the Stanley Cup in 1914. The brothers combined again to win the Cup in 1918 in the newly formed National Hockey League (NHL) with the same Toronto club, then operating under the nickname Toronto Arenas.

Carroll was then head coach of the University of Toronto Schools team in 1918–19, when it won the 1919 Memorial Cup, the inaugural junior ice hockey Memorial Cup championship. He returned to the NHL Toronto club, renamed the Toronto St. Pats, as head coach for its 1920–21 season. The St. Pats won the second half of the split season before losing in the championship playoffs against first half winner Ottawa Senators. He then coached the Toronto Granites in 1921–22, winning the 1922 Allan Cup, the senior ice hockey championship.

== Death ==
Carroll died in an apparent suicide by drowning near Scarborough, Ontario in 1938.

== Coaching record ==
| Team | Year | Regular Season | | | | | | | Post Season |
| Team | Year | G | W | L | T | OTL | Pts | Finish | Result |
|---|---|---|---|---|---|---|---|---|---|
| Toronto St. Patricks | 1920–21 | 24 | 15 | 9 | 0 | — | 30 | 1st in NHL | Lost in NHL Championship |

| Preceded by Harvey Sproule | Head coach of the Toronto St. Patricks; 1920-21 | Succeeded by George O'Donoghue |
