= 1920–21 Toronto St. Patricks season =

NHL hockey team season

1920–21 Toronto St. Patricks
- League: 2nd (1st half), 1st (2nd half) NHL
- 1920–21 record: 15–9–0
- Home record: 9–3–0
- Road record: 6–6–0
- Goals for: 105
- Goals against: 100

Team information
- General manager: Charles Querrie
- Coach: Frank Carroll
- Captain: Reg Noble
- Arena: Arena Gardens

Team leaders
- Goals: Babe Dye (33)
- Assists: Harry Cameron (9)
- Points: Babe Dye (38)
- Penalty minutes: Ken Randall (74)
- Wins: Jake Forbes (13)
- Goals against average: Jake Forbes (3.83)

The 1920–21 Toronto St. Patricks season was the Toronto National Hockey League (NHL) franchise's fourth season, second as the St. Patricks. The club won the regular season schedule and made the playoffs for the first time since the 1917–18 season, but lost in the playoffs and did not play for the Stanley Cup.

== Regular season ==
=== Final standings ===
First half
	GP	W	L	T	Pts	GF	GA
**Ottawa Senators**	10	8	2	0	**16**	49	23
Toronto St. Patricks	10	5	5	0	**10**	39	47
Montreal Canadiens	10	4	6	0	**8**	37	51
Hamilton Tigers	10	3	7	0	**6**	34	38

Second half
	GP	W	L	T	Pts	GF	GA
**Toronto St. Patricks**	14	10	4	0	**20**	66	53
Montreal Canadiens	14	9	5	0	**18**	75	48
Ottawa Senators	14	6	8	0	**12**	48	52
Hamilton Tigers	14	3	11	0	**6**	58	94

Note: W = Wins, L = Losses, T = Ties, GF= Goals For, GA = Goals Against, Pts = Points
Note: Teams that qualified for playoffs highlighted in bold.

=== Record vs. opponents ===
1920–21 NHL Records
Team	HAM	MTL	OTT	TOR
Hamilton	—	3–5	1–7	2–6
Montreal	5–3	—	5–3	3–5
Ottawa	7–1	3–5	—	4–4
Toronto	6–2	5–3	4–4	—

== Schedule and results ==
1920–21 regular season
First half

Game	Result	Date	Score	Opponent	Record
1	L	December 22, 1920	3–6	@ Ottawa Senators (1920–21)	0–1–0
2	W	December 25, 1920	5–4	Montreal Canadiens (1920–21)	1–1–0
3	L	December 29, 1920	1–8	Ottawa Senators (1920–21)	1–2–0
4	W	January 3, 1921	5–4	@ Hamilton Tigers (1920–21)	2–2–0
5	L	January 8, 1921	2–3 OT	Hamilton Tigers (1920–21)	2–3–0
6	W	January 12, 1921	4–2	@ Hamilton Tigers (1920–21)	3–3–0
7	L	January 15, 1921	2–5	Ottawa Senators (1920–21)	3–4–0
8	L	January 17, 1921	5–9	@ Montreal Canadiens (1920–21)	3–5–0
9	W	January 19, 1921	7–2	Montreal Canadiens (1920–21)	4–5–0
10	W	January 22, 1921	5–4 OT	@ Ottawa Senators (1920–21)	5–5–0

Second half

Game	Result	Date	Score	Opponent	Record
11	W	January 26, 1921	10–3	Hamilton Tigers (1920–21)	1–0–0
12	L	January 29, 1921	2–4	@ Montreal Canadiens (1920–21)	1–1–0
13	L	February 2, 1921	3–4	@ Ottawa Senators (1920–21)	1–2–0
14	W	February 5, 1921	10–6	Montreal Canadiens (1920–21)	2–2–0
15	W	February 9, 1921	5–3	@ Montreal Canadiens (1920–21)	3–2–0
16	W	February 12, 1921	6–4	@ Hamilton Tigers (1920–21)	4–2–0
17	W	February 16, 1921	4–3	Ottawa Senators (1920–21)	5–2–0
18	W	February 19, 1921	5–4	Hamilton Tigers (1920–21)	6–2–0
19	L	February 23, 1921	4–7	@ Hamilton Tigers (1920–21)	6–3–0
20	W	February 26, 1921	4–2	Ottawa Senators (1920–21)	7–3–0
21	L	February 28, 1921	0–4	@ Montreal Canadiens (1920–21)	7–4–0
22	W	March 2, 1921	3–2	@ Ottawa Senators (1920–21)	8–4–0
23	W	March 5, 1921	4–3 OT	Hamilton Tigers (1920–21)	9–4–0
24	W	March 7, 1921	6–4	Montreal Canadiens (1920–21)	10–4–0

**Legend**: Win (2 points) Loss (0 points) Tie (1 point)

== Playoffs ==
The St. Patricks qualified first in the second half and played the Senators for the league championship. The Senators defeated the St. Patricks (5–0 and 2–0) to progress to the Stanley Cup Finals against the Vancouver Millionaires, who they also defeated three games to two.

== Player statistics ==
=== Scorers ===
Player	GP	G	A	Pts	PIM
Babe Dye	23	33	5	38	32
Reg Noble	24	19	8	27	54
Harry Cameron	24	18	9	27	35
Corb Denneny	20	19	7	26	29
Ken Randall	22	6	5	11	74
Sprague Cleghorn	13	3	5	8	31
Cully Wilson	8	2	3	5	22
Rod Smylie	23	2	1	3	2
Billy Stuart	19	2	1	3	4
Mickey Roach	9	1	1	2	2
Jake Forbes	20	0	0	0	0
Jack McDonald	6	0	0	0	2
Ivan Mitchell	4	0	0	0	0

Note:

Pos = Position;GP = Games played; G = Goals; A = Assists; Pts = Points; PIM = Penalty minutes; +/- = Plus/minus; PPG = Power-play goals; SHG = Short-handed goals; GWG = Game-winning goals
Pos = Position;GP = Games played; Min, TOI = Minutes played; W = Wins; L = Losses; T,T/OT = Ties; OTL = Overtime losses; GA = Goals-against; GAA = Goals-against average; SO = Shutouts; SA = Shots against; SV = Shots saved;SV% = Save percentage;

== Transactions ==
- December 4, 1920: Loaned Babe Dye to the Hamilton Tigers
- December 15, 1920: Signed Free Agent Rod Smylie
- December 16, 1920: Traded Howard Lockhart to the Hamilton Tigers for cash
- December 24, 1920: Babe Dye returned to Toronto from Hamilton Tigers
- January 25, 1921: Acquired Sprague Cleghorn from Hamilton Tigers for future considerations
- March 15, 1921: Released Sprague Cleghorn
