= Jack Mackell =

Canadian ice hockey player

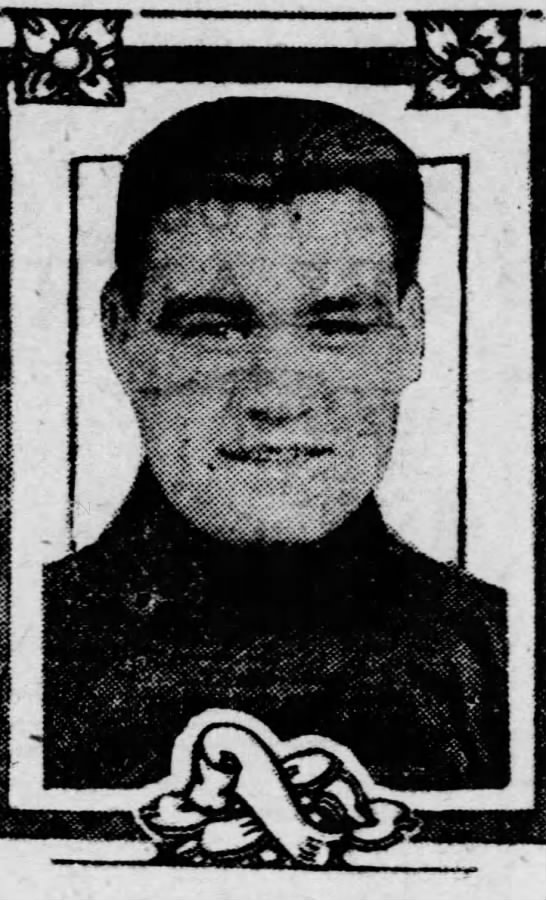
- Mackell in 1916
- Born: December 4, 1894 Ottawa, Ontario, Canada
- Died: November 25, 1961 (aged 66)
- Height: 5 ft 7 in (170 cm)
- Weight: 150 lb (68 kg; 10 st 10 lb)
- Position: Right wing/Defence
- Shot: Right
- Played for: Ottawa Senators
- Playing career: 1915–1924

John Ambrose "Jack" MacKell (December 4, 1894 – November 25, 1961) was a Canadian professional hockey player who played two seasons in the National Hockey League (NHL) for the Ottawa Senators between 1919 and 1921. He was born in Ottawa, Ontario.

== Playing career ==
Mackell played for several seasons in the Ottawa City Hockey League before joining the Senators in 1919. He played 45 games over two seasons in the National Hockey League with the Ottawa Senators before returning Ottawa City League where he played two more seasons before retirement. His son Fleming Mackell also played in the NHL.

== Career statistics ==
=== Regular season and playoffs ===
			Regular season					Playoffs
Season	Team	League	GP	G	A	Pts	PIM	GP	G	A	Pts	PIM
1914–15	Ottawa Collegiate	HS-ON	—	—	—	—	—	—	—	—	—	—
1915–16	Ottawa New Edinburghs	OCHL	7	5	0	5	6	1	2	0	2	0
1916–17	Ottawa Munitions	OCHL	10	7	0	7	48	—	—	—	—	—
1917–18	Ottawa Munitions	OCHL	6	1	0	1	15	1	1	0	1	0
1918–19	Ottawa Munitions	OCHL	7	8	2	10	39	—	—	—	—	—
1919–20	Ottawa Senators	NHL	23	2	1	3	33	—	—	—	—	—
1919–20	Ottawa Senators	St-Cup	—	—	—	—	—	5	0	0	0	0
1920–21	Ottawa Senators	NHL	22	2	1	3	26	2	0	0	0	0
1922–23	Ottawa Munitions	OCHL	3	1	0	1	—	—	—	—	—	—
1923–24	Bank of Montreal	MBHL	8	1	0	1	3	—	—	—	—	—
NHL totals			45	4	2	6	54	2	0	0	0	0

=== Achievements ===
- 1920 - Stanley Cup champion
- 1921 - Stanley Cup champion
