= Jack McDonald (ice hockey, born 1887) =

Canadian ice hockey player (1887-1958)

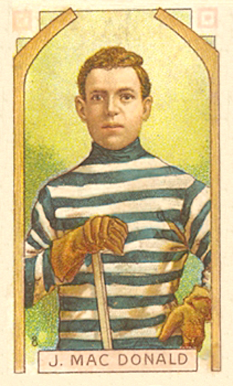
- McDonald with the Quebec Bulldogs.
- Born: February 28, 1887 Quebec City, Quebec, Canada
- Died: January 24, 1958 (aged 70)
- Height: 5 ft 10 in (178 cm)
- Weight: 154 lb (70 kg; 11 st 0 lb)
- Position: Left wing
- Shot: Right
- Played for: NHL; Montreal Wanderers; Montreal Canadiens; Quebec Bulldogs; Toronto St. Pats
- Playing career: 1917–1922

Patrick John McDonald (February 28, 1887 – January 24, 1958) was a Canadian professional ice hockey player who played from 1905 until 1922, including eleven seasons in the National Hockey Association/National Hockey League for the Montreal Canadiens, Montreal Wanderers, Quebec Bulldogs, Toronto Ontarios and Toronto St. Patricks. He was a member of the 1912 Quebec Bulldogs Stanley Cup championship team, playing eleven seasons for the Bulldogs in the period from 1905–06 until 1919–20.

== Playing career ==
Born in Quebec City, Quebec, McDonald played intermediate hockey for the Quebec Crescents in 1905–06, moving to the Eastern Canada Amateur Hockey Association's Quebec Bulldogs for three games. Except for the 1910 season when the Quebec team did not operate due to the failure of the Canadian Hockey Association, McDonald was a member of the Bulldogs until 1912. He was a member of the 1912 Quebec Stanley Cup champion squad.

After the 1912 NHA season, McDonald played in an exhibition of NHA All-Stars out west against the PCHA All-Stars. He signed with the Vancouver Millionaires for the 1913 season, returning east to play for the new Toronto Ontarios for the 1913–14 season He returned to the Bulldogs in December 1914, and stayed with the club until 1917, when the NHA was suspended, and Quebec suspended operations.

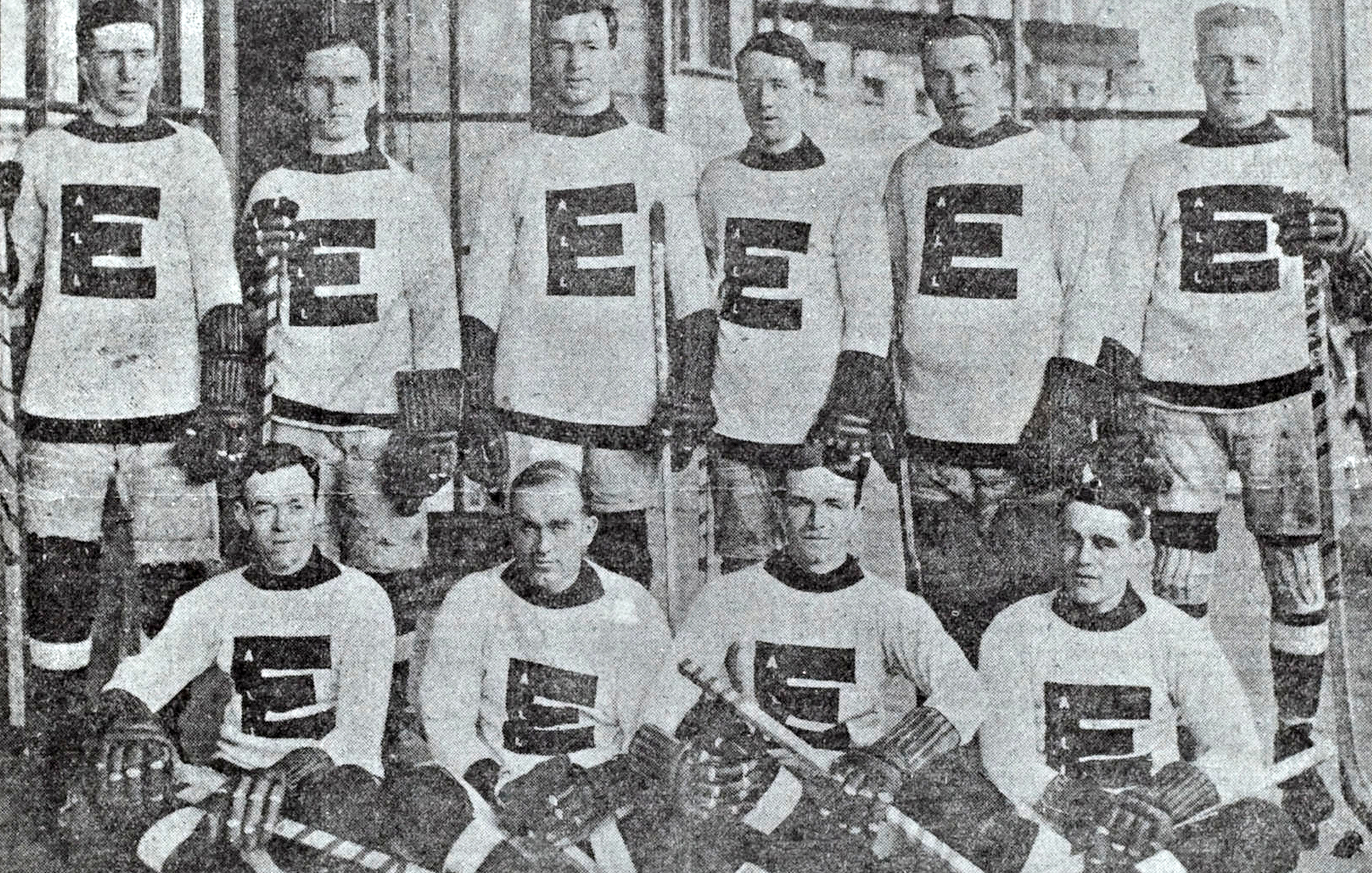
McDonald, sitting at left corner, with the 1912 NHA All-Stars.

In the new NHL, McDonald was picked up by the Montreal Wanderers. McDonald was one of 12 players who were members of the 1917–18 Wanderers' squad. The Wanderers' home arena was destroyed by fire only 6 games into the 22-game schedule. This event forced the league to disperse the Wanderers players via a draft to 1 of the remaining 3 teams (Toronto, Montreal Canadiens, and Ottawa Senators) in the National Hockey League. McDonald was picked up by the Montreal Canadiens for whom he played until 1919, including the ill-fated 1919 Stanley Cup Final which was cancelled after five games (tied at 2-2, with one tied game) because of the Spanish flu pandemic. McDonald was one of the Canadiens players seriously ill with the flu when the series was called off. His teammate Joe Hall would succumb to the illness.

The following season, in 1919–20, Quebec activated its franchise, and he was 'returned' to Quebec by the Canadiens. He played in Quebec's final season in the NHA of 1919–20. The following season, the Quebec franchise was moved to Hamilton and McDonald was traded back to the Canadiens. He split the 1920–21 season with Montreal and the Toronto St. Pats, loaned there by the NHL in an attempt to make all teams competitive. McDonald's final season was in 1921–22 with the Canadiens, suiting up for only three games.

== Career statistics ==
=== Regular season and playoffs ===
			Regular season					Playoffs
Season	Team	League	GP	G	A	Pts	PIM	GP	G	A	Pts	PIM
1905–06	Quebec Crescents	QICHL	—	—	—	—	—	—	—	—	—	—
1905–06	Quebec Bulldogs	ECAHA	3	0	0	0	0	—	—	—	—	—
1906–07	New Glasgow Cubs	St-Cup	—	—	—	—	—	2	2	0	2	—
1906–07	Quebec Bulldogs	ECAHA	9	10	0	10	13	—	—	—	—	—
1907–08	Quebec Bulldogs	ECAHA	9	9	0	9	14	—	—	—	—	—
1908–09	Quebec Bulldogs	ECHA	9	8	0	8	17	—	—	—	—	—
1909–10	Quebec Bulldogs	CHA	3	9	0	9	2	—	—	—	—	—
1909–10	Waterloo Colts	OPHL	1	6	0	6	0	—	—	—	—	—
1909–10	Waterloo Colts	OPHL	15	22	0	22	16	—	—	—	—	—
1910–11	Quebec Bulldogs	NHA	16	14	0	14	25	—	—	—	—	—
1911–12	Quebec Bulldogs	NHA	17	18	0	18	0	—	—	—	—	—
1911–12	Quebec Bulldogs	St-Cup	—	—	—	—	—	2	9	0	9	0
1912–13	Vancouver Millionaires	PCHA	16	11	4	15	9	—	—	—	—	—
1913–14	Toronto Ontarios	NHA	20	27	8	35	12	—	—	—	—	—
1914–15	Quebec Bulldogs	NHA	19	9	8	17	17	—	—	—	—	—
1915–16	Quebec Bulldogs	NHA	20	9	5	14	10	—	—	—	—	—
1916–17	Quebec Bulldogs	NHA	19	13	8	21	0	—	—	—	—	—
1918–18	Montreal Wanderers	NHL	4	3	1	4	3	—	—	—	—	—
1917–18	Montreal Canadiens	NHL	8	9	1	10	12	2	1	0	1	0
1918–19	Montreal Canadiens	NHL	18	8	4	12	9	5	0	3	3	3
1918–19	Montreal Canadiens	St-Cup	—	—	—	—	—	5	1	1	2	3
1919–20	Quebec Bulldogs	NHL	24	6	7	13	4	—	—	—	—	—
1920–21	Montreal Canadiens	NHL	6	0	1	1	0	—	—	—	—	—
1920–21	Toronto St. Pats	NHL	6	0	0	0	0	—	—	—	—	—
1921–22	Montreal Canadiens	NHL	3	0	0	0	0	—	—	—	—	—
NHA totals			111	90	29	119	64	—	—	—	—	—
NHL totals			69	26	14	40	30	7	1	3	4	3

== Transactions ==
- December 21, 1914 – Traded to Quebec (NHA) by Toronto (NHA) for Tommy Smith
- November 26, 1917 – Claimed by Montreal Wanderers (NHL) in Quebec dispersal draft.
- January 4, 1918 – Claimed by Montreal in Wanderers dispersal draft.
- November 25, 1919 – Returned to Quebec by Montreal when Quebec activated.
- November 2, 1920 – Transferred to Hamilton after Quebec relocated.
- November 27, 1920 – Traded to Montreal by Hamilton with Harry Mummery and Dave Ritchie for Goldie Prodgers, Joe Matte, Jack Coughlin and loan of Billy Coutu for 1920–21 season.
- February 11, 1921 – Loaned to Toronto by Montreal for the remainder of the 1920-21 season.

Source: "Legends of hockey".
