= Jack Coughlin (ice hockey) =

Canadian ice hockey player (1892-1969)

- Born: June 21, 1892 Douro, Ontario, Canada
- Died: June 21, 1969 (aged 77) Peterborough, Ontario, Canada
- Height: 5 ft 10 in (178 cm)
- Weight: 170 lb (77 kg; 12 st 2 lb)
- Position: Right wing
- Shot: Right
- Played for: Toronto Arenas; Quebec Bulldogs; Montreal Canadiens; Hamilton Tigers
- Playing career: 1912–1921

John Joseph "Jack" Coughlin (June 21, 1892 – June 21, 1969) was a Canadian ice hockey player. After several years as an amateur player, he turned professional in 1916, joining the Toronto Blueshirts of the National Hockey Association (NHA). The NHA was replaced by the National Hockey League (NHL) from 1917 to 1920, and Coughlin joined the Toronto Arenas for one season, winning the Stanley Cup with them in 1918. He took a one-year hiatus and returned in 1919 to play briefly with the Quebec Bulldogs, Montreal Canadiens, and Hamilton Tigers before retiring in 1921, having played 26 pro games: 7 in the NHA and 19 in the NHL. He died in 1969 at Peterborough, Ontario.

== Playing career ==
He was born in Douro, Ontario. Coughlin played amateur ice hockey starting in junior with Peterborough, Ontario in 1909–10. He played four seasons for Peterborough, including one final season in the senior. He then played for Ingersoll, Ontario in intermediate hockey for a season, and a season for Portage Lake-Houghton, Michigan, both seasons as an amateur. He became a professional for the Toronto Blueshirts in 1916–17. When the NHL was formed in 1917–18, he played for the "temporary" Toronto franchise, which went on to win the Stanley Cup, although he was released by Toronto before the playoffs. He bounced around the NHL for the next few seasons with the Quebec Bulldogs, Montreal Canadiens, and Hamilton Tigers. He attempted to return to amateur, but his bid to be reinstated as an amateur was denied by the Ontario Hockey Association in 1921.

== Career statistics ==
=== Regular season and playoffs ===
| | | | Regular season | | | | | Playoffs |
| Season | Team | League | GP | G | A | Pts | PIM | GP | G | A | Pts | PIM |
|---|---|---|---|---|---|---|---|---|---|---|---|---|
| 1912–13 | Peterborough Seniors | OHA | 6 | 4 | 0 | 4 | 4 | — | — | — | — | — |
| 1913–14 | Ingersoll Seniors | OHA | — | — | — | — | — | — | — | — | — | — |
| 1914–15 | New York Irish-Americans | AAHL | — | — | — | — | — | — | — | — | — | — |
| 1915–16 | Peterborough Electrics | OHA | — | — | — | — | — | — | — | — | — | — |
| 1915–16 | Houghton Seniors | USHA | — | — | — | — | — | — | — | — | — | — |
| 1916–17 | Toronto Blueshirts | NHA | 7 | 2 | 0 | 2 | 0 | — | — | — | — | — |
| 1917–18 | Toronto Arenas | NHL | 5 | 2 | 0 | 2 | 3 | — | — | — | — | — |
| 1919–20 | Quebec Bulldogs | NHL | 9 | 0 | 0 | 0 | 0 | — | — | — | — | — |
| 1919–20 | Montreal Canadiens | NHL | 3 | 0 | 0 | 0 | 0 | — | — | — | — | — |
| 1920–21 | Hamilton Tigers | NHL | 2 | 0 | 0 | 0 | 0 | — | — | — | — | — |
| NHA totals | | | 7 | 2 | 0 | 2 | 0 | — | — | — | — | — |
| NHL totals | | | 19 | 2 | 0 | 2 | 3 | — | — | — | — | — |

== Transactions ==
- January 10, 1917 – Signed as a free agent by Toronto Blueshirts
- February 11, 1917 – Claimed by Ottawa in NHA dispersal draft of Toronto players
- June 1917 – Rights reverted to Toronto
- January 5, 1918 – Released by Toronto
- January 13, 1920 – Signed as a free agent by Quebec
- February 11, 1920 – Released by Quebec
- November 27, 1920 – Traded to Hamilton by Montreal Canadiens with Joe Matte and Goldie Prodgers for Harry Mummery, Jack Patrick McDonald and Dave Ritchie plus the loan of Billy Coutu for 1920-21
