= Dave Campbell (ice hockey) =

Canadian ice hockey player

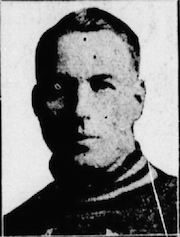
- Born: April 27, 1896; Lachute, Quebec, Canada
- Died: February 18, 1975 (aged 78)
- Height: 6 ft 0 in (183 cm)
- Weight: 200 lb (91 kg; 14 st 4 lb)
- Position: Defence
- Shot: Left
- Played for: Montreal Canadiens
- Playing career: 1920–1928

David Dewar Campbell (April 27, 1896 – February 18, 1975) was a Canadian hockey defenceman. Campbell played two games in the National Hockey League for the Montreal Canadiens during the 1920–21 season. He played in the Montreal City Hockey League from 1913 to 1927.

He was a Sergeant in the Canadian Army in the First World War.

Campbell coached Victoria Vics and Verdun Maple Leafs of the Quebec Senior Hockey League. He served as mayor of the Town of Lachute.

== Career statistics ==
=== Regular season and playoffs ===
			Regular season					Playoffs
Season	Team	League	GP	G	A	Pts	PIM	GP	G	A	Pts	PIM
1913–14	Montreal Northern Electric	MCHL	10	2	0	2	10	—	—	—	—	—
1913–14	Montreal La Casquette	MCHL	9	3	0	3	—	—	—	—	—	—
1914–15	Montreal La Casquette	MCHL	10	3	0	3	12	—	—	—	—	—
1915–16	Laval University	MCHL	9	2	0	2	20	1	0	0	0	0
1918–19	Montreal Le National	MCHL	9	4	8	12	15	—	—	—	—	—
1919–20	Laval University	MCHL	10	2	3	5	18	—	—	—	—	—
1920–21	Montreal Canadiens	NHL	2	0	0	0	0	—	—	—	—	—
1922–23	Montreal Le National	MCHL	5	0	0	0	0	—	—	—	—	—
1923–24	Montreal Le National	MCHL	10	4	0	4	—	—	—	—	—	—
1924–25	Montreal Le National	MCHL	14	2	0	2	—	—	—	—	—	—
1925–26	Montreal Le National	MCHL	9	6	0	6	10	—	—	—	—	—
1925–26	Montreal Northern Electric	MRTAHL	7	1	0	1	4	1	0	0	0	2
1926–27	Montreal Victorias	MCHL	4	2	2	4	16	—	—	—	—	—
1926–27	Montreal Victorias	Exhib	15	26	0	26	—	—	—	—	—	—
1926–27	Montreal Northern Electric	MRTAHL	2	1	0	1	2	—	—	—	—	—
1927–28	Philadelphia Arrows	Can-Am	19	0	0	0	30	—	—	—	—	—
NHL totals			2	0	0	0	0	—	—	—	—	—
