= Dave Ritchie (ice hockey) =

Canadian ice hockey player (1891-1973)

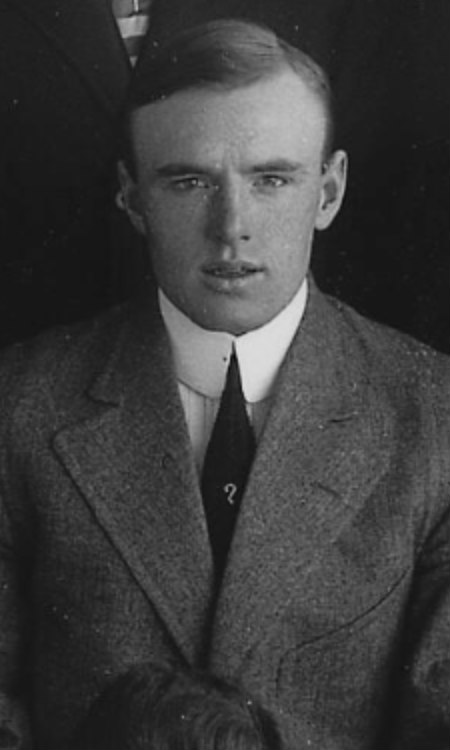
- Ritchie with Grand-Mère HC in 1910–11
- Born: October 1, 1891 Montreal, Quebec, Canada
- Died: March 6, 1973 (aged 81) Montreal, Quebec, Canada
- Height: 5 ft 7 in (170 cm)
- Weight: 180 lb (82 kg; 12 st 12 lb)
- Position: Defence
- Shot: Right
- Played for: NHL; Montreal Wanderers; Ottawa Senators; Toronto Arenas; Quebec Bulldogs; Montreal Canadiens; NHA; Quebec Bulldogs
- Playing career: 1914–1926

David Alexander Ritchie (October 1, 1891 – March 6, 1973) was a Canadian professional ice hockey player who played nine seasons in the National Hockey Association (NHA) and the National Hockey League (NHL) for the Quebec Bulldogs, Montreal Wanderers, Ottawa Senators, Toronto Arenas and Montreal Canadiens. He scored the first goal in NHL history, on December 19, 1917, as a member of the Wanderers in a game against the Toronto Arenas.

== Playing career ==
Ritchie started his amateur career with the Montreal Westmount in his hometown of Montreal, and would later join the Grand-Mère Hockey Club in the Interprovincial Amateur Hockey Union. Grand-Mère had one of the better amateur sides in hockey in the early to mid-1910s, with Ritchie as one of its key players, and in 1913–14 they played for the Allan Cup against the Regina Victorias, losing out in the final series 5 goals to 10 (4-6, 1-4).

Ritchie turned professional in 1914 when he signed as a free agent with the Quebec Bulldogs of the National Hockey Association. In three years with Quebec, he had 43 points in 56 games. He scored a career-high of 17 goals in 1916–17 and finished seventh in league scoring.

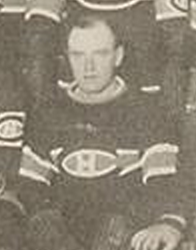
Dave Ritchie with the 1925–26 Montreal Canadiens.

The 1916–17 season was the last season of the NHA's existence and the Bulldogs suspended operations for two years. The team's players were dispersed among the new teams in the NHL, and Ritchie was selected by the Montreal Wanderers. He scored the first goal in National Hockey League history in the league's first game, between the Wanderers and the Toronto Arenas on December 19, 1917. A couple of weeks later, on January 2, 1918, the Wanderers' home rink, the Montreal Arena, was destroyed in a fire. The team withdrew from the league and Ritchie was selected by the Ottawa Senators, with whom he played the remainder of the season.

In the middle of the 1918–19 NHL season, on January 17, 1919, Ritchie signed with the Toronto Arenas and played in four of the club's remaining ten games. Before the start of the 1919–20 NHL season, he was transferred to the Quebec Bulldogs, who had resumed operations and joined the NHL. Ritchie played in all but one of the team's 24 games that season and scored six goals. At the end of the 1919–20 season, the Bulldogs moved to Hamilton, Ontario and were renamed the Tigers. The Tigers traded Ritchie to the Montreal Canadiens before the start of the 1920–21 season. He played only six games that season and quit to become a referee. He returned to the Canadiens in 1924 and played seven games over the next two seasons.

Dave Ritchie died in Montreal in 1973.

=== Career notes ===
- He played for every team that played in the National Hockey League from 1917 to 1920.
- He was the last active member of the Quebec Bulldogs.

== Career statistics ==
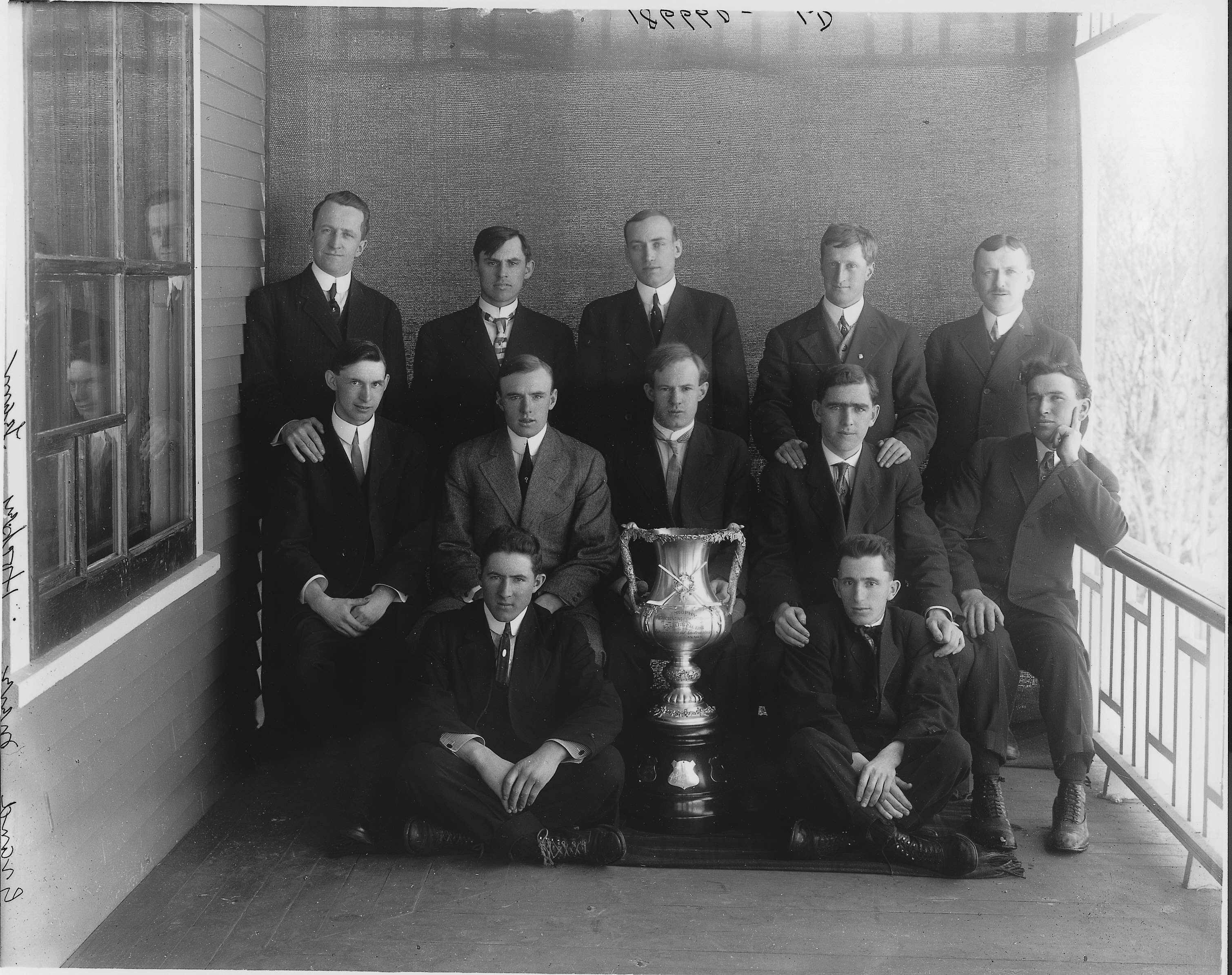
Ritchie, second from left in the middle row, with the Grand-Mère HC in 1910–11.

=== Regular season and playoffs ===
			Regular season					Playoffs
Season	Team	League	GP	G	A	Pts	PIM	GP	G	A	Pts	PIM
1909–10	Montreal Westmount	SLVHL	—	—	—	—	—	—	—	—	—	—
1910–11	Grand-Mère HC	IPAHU	—	—	—	—	—	—	—	—	—	—
1911–12	Grand-Mère HC	IPAHU	8	13	0	13	—	2	5	0	5	—
1912–13	Grand-Mère HC	IPAHU	5	3	0	3	—	4	4	0	4	—
1912–13	Grand-Mère HC	Al-Cup	—	—	—	—	—	2	1	0	1	0
1913–14	Grand-Mère HC	IPAHU	—	—	—	—	—	—	—	—	—	—
1913–14	Grand-Mère HC	Al-Cup	—	—	—	—	—	2	0	0	0	6
1914–15	Quebec Bulldogs	NHA	14	2	1	3	0	—	—	—	—	—
1915–16	Quebec Bulldogs	NHA	23	9	4	13	38	—	—	—	—	—
1916–17	Quebec Bulldogs	NHA	19	17	10	27	20	—	—	—	—	—
1917–18	Montreal Wanderers	NHL	4	5	2	7	3	—	—	—	—	—
1917–18	Ottawa Senators	NHL	14	4	1	5	18	—	—	—	—	—
1918–19	Toronto Arenas	NHL	4	0	0	0	9	—	—	—	—	—
1919–20	Quebec Bulldogs	NHL	23	6	3	9	18	—	—	—	—	—
1920–21	Montreal Canadiens	NHL	6	0	0	0	2	—	—	—	—	—
1924–25	Montreal Canadiens	NHL	5	0	0	0	0	1	0	0	0	0
1925–26	Montreal Canadiens	NHL	2	0	0	0	0	—	—	—	—	—
NHA totals			56	28	15	43	58	—	—	—	—	—
NHL totals			58	15	6	21	50	1	0	0	0	0

== Transactions ==
- Signed as a free agent by the Quebec Bulldogs (NHA), December 1, 1914.
- Claimed from the Quebec Bulldogs by the Montreal Wanderers in NHL Dispersal Draft, November 26, 1917.
- Claimed from the Montreal Wanderers by the Ottawa Senators in NHL Dispersal Draft, January 4, 1918.
- Signed as a free agent by the Toronto Arenas, January 17, 1919.
- Transferred from the Toronto Arenas to the Quebec Bulldogs when the franchise returned to the NHL, November 25, 1919.
- Transferred from the Quebec Bulldogs to the Hamilton Tigers after the franchise relocated, November 2, 1920.
- Traded from the Hamilton Tigers with Harry Mummery and Jack McDonald to the Montreal Canadiens for Goldie Prodgers, Joe Matte, Jack Coughlin and the loan of Billy Coutu for the 1920-21 season, November 27, 1920.
- Signed as a free agent by the Montreal Canadiens, January 28, 1925.
- Signed as a free agent by the Montreal Canadiens, January 13, 1926
