= Speed Moynes =

Canadian ice hockey player

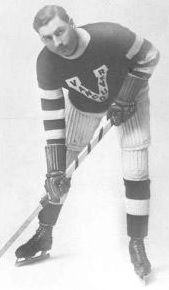
- Born: July 14, 1892 Lindsay, Ontario, Canada
- Died: June 21, 1984 (aged 91) Trail, British Columbia, Canada
- Height: 5 ft 11 in (180 cm)
- Weight: 167 lb (76 kg; 11 st 13 lb)
- Position: Right wing
- Shot: Right
- Played for: Vancouver Millionaires
- Playing career: 1913–1926

Dougald Sinclair "Speed" Moynes (July 14, 1892 – June 21, 1984) was a Canadian professional ice hockey player. He played with the Vancouver Millionaires of the Pacific Coast Hockey Association. Moynes was born in Lindsay, Ontario, but grew up in Russell, Manitoba.

He also played for the Melville Millionaires in Saskatchewan, and after serving in World War I, the Trail Smoke Eaters. His nickname was a reference to his renowned speed, as he was one of the fastest skaters in hockey at the time. Moynes died in 1984 at a hospital in Trail, British Columbia.
