= Billy Coutu =

Canadian ice hockey player

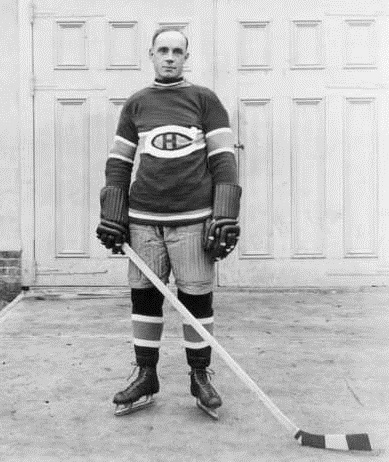
- Born: March 1, 1892 North Bay, Ontario, Canada
- Died: February 25, 1977 (aged 84) Sault Ste. Marie, Ontario, Canada
- Height: 5 ft 11 in (180 cm)
- Weight: 190 lb (86 kg; 13 st 8 lb)
- Position: Defence
- Shot: Left
- Played for: Montreal Canadiens; Hamilton Tigers; Boston Bruins
- Playing career: 1911–1933

Wilfrid Arthur Coutu (March 1, 1892 – February 25, 1977), nicknamed "Wild Beaver", was a Canadian professional ice hockey defenceman who played ten seasons in the National Hockey League for the Montreal Canadiens, the Hamilton Tigers, and the Boston Bruins. Known for his fiery temper, Coutu was once given 42 penalty minutes in a 1923 playoff game against the Ottawa Senators, still a record to this day. He is the only player ever to have been banned from the NHL for life, as a result of his attack on a referee in 1927.

While a member of the Montreal Canadiens, Coutu was one of the players hospitalized during the cancelled 1919 Stanley Cup series, won the Stanley Cup in the 1923–24 NHL season, and was captain of the team in the 1925–26 NHL season. After his eviction from the NHL, Coutu played a total of four years in the Canadian-American Hockey League (C-AHL) and American Hockey Association (AHA), then coached the C-AHL's Providence Reds.

== Personal life ==
Billy Coutu's last name is sometimes incorrectly spelled "Couture", an error which appears in many NHL history books and, for a time, even showed up on the Montreal Canadiens website. Several hockey history books, including The Hockey News "Habs Heroes" by Ken Campbell, incorrectly attribute his name to a photograph of teammate Louis Berlinguette. He and his family pronounced their name "Kootoo", which was sometimes confused with "Couture".

Coutu's brother, Louis, was a trapper, who in 1928 discovered a message in a bottle from a survivor of the shipwreck of the SS Kamloops.

Coutu’s wife, Gertrude, was the sister of Wilhemina Aird Stewart—the mother of Mary Morenz. Mary married Howie Morenz, a Hockey Hall of Famer and teammate of Coutu on the Canadiens. Their daughter, Marlene, later married another Hall of Famer, Bernie Geoffrion

== Playing career ==
Coutu turned professional with the Canadiens in 1916–17, the last season of the NHA. He stayed with the Canadiens when the new NHL formed for 1917–18. During the Stanley Cup playoffs in 1919, Coutu and four other teammates contracted influenza and were hospitalized. The 1919 Stanley Cup series was cancelled.

After playing the 1920–21 NHL season with the Hamilton Tigers, Coutu was traded back to Montreal before the start of the 1921–22 NHL season, along with Sprague Cleghorn, in exchange for Harry Mummery, Amos Arbour, and Cully Wilson, in the NHL's first multiple-player trade.

Wearing No. 9, Coutu was named Canadiens captain in 1925–26, replacing Sprague Cleghorn. After the 1925–26 NHL season, Coutu was deemed expendable and traded to the Boston Bruins in exchange for defenceman Amby Moran, who ultimately played just 12 games for the Canadiens.

During his first practice with the Bruins, Coutu body-slammed Eddie Shore. Coutu's forehead hit Shore's skull, severing Shore's ear. Shore visited several doctors who wanted to amputate the ear, but finally found one who sewed it back on. After refusing anaesthetic, Shore used a mirror to watch the doctor sew the ear back on. Shore claimed Coutu used his hockey stick to cut off the ear, and Coutu was fined $50; Shore later recanted, and Coutu's money was refunded.

At the end of Game 4 of the 1927 Stanley Cup Final, Coutu started a bench-clearing brawl, apparently at the request of coach Art Ross, by assaulting referee Jerry Laflamme and tackling referee Billy Bell in the corridor. As a result, he was expelled from the NHL for life, the longest suspension to date. On October 8, 1929, the suspension was lifted, allowing Coutu to play in minor professional leagues, where he played into his late 30s with Minneapolis and also coached for several years. He never played in the NHL again, although the lifetime ban was lifted in 1929–30 and Coutu was reinstated in 1932–33 at the insistence of Canadiens owner Leo Dandurand.

== Career statistics ==
=== Regular season and playoffs ===
			Regular season					Playoffs
Season	Team	League	GP	G	A	Pts	PIM	GP	G	A	Pts	PIM
1915–16	Michigan Soo Indians	NMHL	—	—	—	—	—	—	—	—	—	—
1916–17	Montreal Canadiens	NHA	18	0	0	0	9	2	0	0	0	8
1916–17	Montreal Canadiens	St-Cup	—	—	—	—	—	4	0	0	0	38
1917–18	Montreal Canadiens	NHL	20	2	2	4	49	2	0	0	0	3
1918–19	Montreal Canadiens	NHL	15	1	2	3	18	5	0	1	1	8
1918–19	Montreal Canadiens	St-Cup	—	—	—	—	—	5	0	1	1	0
1919–20	Montreal Canadiens	NHL	20	4	0	4	67	—	—	—	—	—
1920–21	Hamilton Tigers	NHL	24	8	4	12	95	—	—	—	—	—
1921–22	Montreal Canadiens	NHL	24	4	3	7	8	—	—	—	—	—
1922–23	Montreal Canadiens	NHL	24	5	2	7	37	1	0	0	0	22
1923–24	Montreal Canadiens	NHL	16	3	1	4	18	2	0	0	0	0
1923–24	Montreal Canadiens	St-Cup	—	—	—	—	—	4	0	0	0	0
1924–25	Montreal Canadiens	NHL	28	3	2	5	56	2	0	0	0	2
1924–25	Montreal Canadiens	St-Cup	—	—	—	—	—	4	1	0	1	12
1925–26	Montreal Canadiens	NHL	33	2	4	6	95	—	—	—	—	—
1926–27	Boston Bruins	NHL	40	1	1	2	35	7	1	0	1	4
1927–28	New Haven Eagles	Can-Am	37	11	1	12	108	—	—	—	—	—
1928–29	Newark Bulldogs	Can-Am	40	0	1	1	42	—	—	—	—	—
1929–30	Minneapolis Millers	AHA	47	8	2	10	105	—	—	—	—	—
1930–31	Minneapolis Millers	AHA	33	0	1	1	46	—	—	—	—	—
1932–33	Providence Reds	Can-Am	1	0	0	0	0	—	—	—	—	—
NHL totals			244	33	21	54	478	19	1	1	2	39
St-Cup totals			—	—	—	—	—	17	1	1	2	50

== Transactions ==
- November 24, 1916 – Signed as a free agent by Montreal Canadiens (NHA).
- November 26, 1917 – Rights retained by Montreal Canadiens after NHA folded.
- November 27, 1920 – Loaned to Hamilton Tigers by Montreal Canadiens as part of trade of Jack McDonald, Harry Mummery and Dave Ritchie to Hamilton for Jack Coughlin, Samuel (Goldie) Prodgers and Joe Matte.
- January 26, 1921 – Returned to Montreal Canadiens from loan to Hamilton Tigers.
- November 15, 1921 – Fined $200 and suspended by the Montreal Canadiens for rough play.
- March 8, 1923 – Missed seven games due to a broken wrist suffered in a game vs. Toronto St. Patricks.
- January 21, 1925 – Suspended two games and fined $100 by the NHL for misconduct.
- January 19, 1926 – Suspended one game and fined $100 by the NHL for tripping referee Jerry Laflamme vs Ottawa Senators.
- October 22, 1926 – Traded to Boston Bruins by Montreal Canadiens for Amby Moran.
- April 13, 1927 – Suspended for life from the NHL for assaulting referee Jerry Laflamme, tackling referee Billy Bell, and starting a bench-clearing brawl after a Stanley Cup game.
- January 5, 1928 – Traded to New Haven (C-AHL) by Boston with Pat (Nobby) Clark for cash.
- January 28, 1928 – Suspended for the season by C-AHL for hitting George Redding of Boston with his stick on January 23, 1928, game.
- January 29, 1928 – Suspension lifted by C-AHL and changed to a $200 fine.
- August 19, 1928 – Traded to Minneapolis (AHA) by New Haven (C-AHL) for cash.
- November 8, 1928 – Released by Minneapolis (AHA).
- October 8, 1929 – Lifetime suspension from NHL lifted.
- October 2, 1934 – Named manager of Providence (C-AHL).
- March 24, 1935 – Ejected from C-AHL game for abusing referee Jack Cameron.

== NHL records (2) ==
- Most penalty minutes, playoff game: 42 (tied with Dave Schultz and Deryk Engelland) on March 7, 1923
- Most penalty minutes, playoff period: 42 (tied with Deryk Engelland) on March 7, 1923

== See also ==
- 1919 Stanley Cup Final
- List of family relations in the NHL
- Violence in ice hockey

Preceded by Sprague Cleghorn	Montreal Canadiens captain 1925–26	Succeeded by Sylvio Mantha
