= 1920–21 NHL season =

Professional ice hockey league season

- League: National Hockey League
- Sport: Ice hockey
- Duration: December 22, 1920 – March 14, 1921
- Games: 24
- Teams: 4

Regular season
- Top scorer: Newsy Lalonde (Canadiens)

O'Brien Cup
- Champions: Ottawa Senators
- Runners-up: Toronto St. Patricks

NHL seasons
- ← 1919–20 1921–22 →

The 1920–21 NHL season was the fourth season of the National Hockey League (NHL). Four teams each played 24 games in a split season. The Quebec franchise was transferred to Hamilton, Ontario, to become the Hamilton Tigers. The Ottawa Senators won the league championship in a playoff with the Toronto St. Patricks. The Senators went on to win the Stanley Cup by defeating the Vancouver Millionaires of the Pacific Coast Hockey Association three games to two in a best-of-five series. This would be the last split season before the NHL changed its regular season and playoff formats.

== League business ==
Eddie Livingstone was again talking of creating a rival league and mentioned Hamilton as a city in his league. To head this off, league president Frank Calder got the owners of the league to admit a Hamilton franchise. As Abso-Pure had built an arena, all owners agreed that it would be wise to have a franchise in Hamilton. Because Quebec had done so badly the previous season, Calder said that Quebec's players would be given to Hamilton. Although Mike Quinn was non-committal at first, he finally sold the team to Hamilton and it became the Hamilton Tigers.

== Regular season ==
The Tigers had some trouble signing Joe Malone from the Quebec days, but he finally did sign. The Tigers were awarded two players from the Senators, Punch Broadbent and Sprague Cleghorn by NHL president Calder, but both refused to sign with the Tigers, and eventually returned to the Senators. Cleghorn was awarded to the Toronto St. Patricks and at first balked at the move, but did report. After the St. Patricks were defeated in the NHL playoffs, Cleghorn joined Ottawa in a deal. NHL president Frank Calder did not like this and the following season a trading deadline was instituted.

The Tigers stunned the Canadiens 5–0 in the team's first-ever game with Babe Dye starring and Howard Lockhart getting the only shutout of his NHL career. The Toronto St. Patricks lost Corbett Denneny to injuries and recalled Dye from Hamilton, giving them Mickey Roach in his place.

Corbett Denneny scored six goals in a game January 26, 1921, helping the Toronto St. Patricks to wallop the Hamilton Tigers 10–3. Cy Denneny wasn't about to let his brother steal the thunder and he scored six goals himself in a March 7 game as the Ottawa Senators hammered the Hamilton Tigers 12–5. For the first time, a brother combination had scored six goals in a game the same season.

Also on January 26, 1921, the Ottawa Senators left the ice with 5:13 to play in a game against the Montreal Canadiens. According to the Senators, referee Cooper Smeaton was one-sided in favour of the Canadiens. Smeaton let the Canadiens continue to play, allowing goals by Newsy Lalonde and Amos Arbour before calling the game. Smeaton denied the claim, stating "a referee is always paid and receives the same salary, regardless what team wins." Smeaton would resign over the incident, but was convinced to return to refereeing later in the season. The Senators were fined $500 by NHL president Frank Calder for the incident.

The Ottawa Senators won the first half of the split season while the Toronto St. Patricks won the second half.

=== Final standings ===
First half
	GP	W	L	T	Pts	GF	GA
**Ottawa Senators**	10	8	2	0	**16**	49	23
Toronto St. Patricks	10	5	5	0	**10**	39	47
Montreal Canadiens	10	4	6	0	**8**	37	51
Hamilton Tigers	10	3	7	0	**6**	34	38

Second half
	GP	W	L	T	Pts	GF	GA
**Toronto St. Patricks**	14	10	4	0	**20**	66	53
Montreal Canadiens	14	9	5	0	**18**	75	48
Ottawa Senators	14	6	8	0	**12**	48	52
Hamilton Tigers	14	3	11	0	**6**	58	94

Note: W = Wins, L = Losses, T = Ties, GF= Goals For, GA = Goals Against, Pts = Points
Note: Teams that qualified for playoffs highlighted in bold.

== Playoffs ==
=== NHL Championship ===
Ottawa, winner of the first half of the split regular season, played Toronto, winner of the second half, in a total-goals series for the O'Brien Cup and to compete for the Stanley Cup. Ottawa won by shutting out the St. Pats in both games. Ottawa then went on to play the Vancouver Millionaires of the PCHA.

March 10	Toronto St. Pats	0–5	Ottawa Senators	The Arena	Recap
No scoring		First period	No scoring
No scoring		Second period	01:45 – pp – Cy Denneny (1); 06:30 – Buck Boucher (1)
No scoring		Third period	11:00 – Cy Denneny (2); 16:45 – Buck Boucher (2); 18:15 – Buck Boucher (3)
Jake Forbes		Goalie stats	Clint Benedict

March 14	Ottawa Senators	2–0	Toronto St. Pats	Arena Gardens	Recap
No scoring		First period	No scoring
No scoring		Second period	No scoring
Eddie Gerard (1) - 11:00; Frank Nighbor (1) - 14:00		Third period	No scoring
Clint Benedict		Goalie stats	Jake Forbes

Senators won series on total goals 7–0

=== Stanley Cup Final ===
The five games were played in Denman Arena, Vancouver.

March 21	Ottawa Senators	1–3	Vancouver Millionaires	Denman Arena	Recap
No scoring		First period	15:40 - Alf Skinner (1); 18:15 - Art Duncan (1)
Jack Darragh (1) - 15:55		Second period	1:20 - Smokey Harris (1)
No scoring		Third period	No scoring
Clint Benedict		Goalie stats	Hugh Lehman

March 24	Ottawa Senators	4–3	Vancouver Millionaires	Denman Arena	Recap
Buck Boucher (4) - 8:05; Cy Denneny (3) - 18:26		First period	1:29 - Smokey Harris (2); 3:01 - Jack Adams (1); 10:29 - Art Duncan (1)
Jack Darragh (2) - 10:49		Second period	No scoring
Punch Broadbent (1) - pp - 16:40		Third period	No scoring
Clint Benedict		Goalie stats	Hugh Lehman

March 28	Ottawa Senators	3–2	Vancouver Millionaires	Denman Arena	Recap
Jack Darragh (3) - 8:57		First period	1:59 - Lloyd Cook (1)
Cy Denneny (4) - sh - 8:22; Sprague Cleghorn (1) - 10:52		Second period	18:02 - Jack Adams (2)
No scoring		Third period	No scoring
Clint Benedict		Goalie stats	Hugh Lehman

March 31	Ottawa Senators	2–3	Vancouver Millionaires	Denman Arena	Recap
No scoring		First period	No scoring
Buck Boucher (5) - 13:43		Second period	2:22 - Alf Skinner (2)
Punch Broadbent (2) - 16:52		Third period	1:35 - Alf Skinner (3); 15:52 - pp - Lloyd Cook (2)
Clint Benedict		Goalie stats	Hugh Lehman

April 4	Ottawa Senators	2–1	Vancouver Millionaires	Denman Arena	Recap
No scoring		First period	16:26 - Alf Skinner (4)
Jack Darragh (4) - 7:27; Jack Darragh (5) - 9:40		Second period	No scoring
No scoring		Third period	No scoring
Clint Benedict		Goalie stats	Hugh Lehman

Ottawa won the series 3–2

== Player statistics ==
=== Scoring leaders ===
Note: GP = Games played; G = Goals; A = Assists; Pts = Points

Player	Team	GP	G	A	Pts
Newsy Lalonde	Montreal Canadiens	24	33	10	43
Cecil "Babe" Dye	Hamilton Tigers / Toronto St. Pats	24	35	5	40
Cy Denneny	Ottawa Senators	24	34	5	39
Joe Malone	Hamilton Tigers	20	28	9	37
Frank Nighbor	Ottawa Senators	24	19	10	29
Reg Noble	Toronto St. Patricks	24	19	8	27
Harry Cameron	Toronto St. Patricks	24	18	9	27
George "Goldie" Prodgers	Hamilton Tigers	24	18	9	27
Corbett Denneny	Toronto St. Patricks	20	19	7	26
Jack Darragh	Ottawa Senators	24	11	15	26

Source: NHL.

=== Leading goaltenders ===
GP = Games Played, GA = Goals Against, SO = Shutouts, GAA = Goals Against Average

Name	Team	GP	Mins	W	L	T	GA	SO	GAA
Clint Benedict	Ottawa Senators	24	1462	14	10	0	75	2	3.08
Jake Forbes	Toronto St. Patricks	20	1221	13	7	0	78	0	3.83
Georges Vezina	Montreal Canadiens	24	1441	13	11	0	99	1	4.12
Howie Lockhart	Hamilton Tigers	24	1454	6	18	0	132	1	5.45
Ivan Mitchell	Toronto St. Patricks	4	240	2	2	0	22	0	5.50

Source: NHL

=== NHL Playoff scoring leader ===
Note: GP = Games played; G = Goals; A = Assists; Pts = Points

Player	Team	GP	G	A	Pts	PIM
Frank Nighbor	Ottawa Senators	2	1	3	4	2

== Awards ==
- O'Brien Cup – Ottawa Senators

Note:

The O'Brien Cup, still considered the championship of the NHA, was not awarded to Ottawa until November 1921. It had remained under the care of the Canadiens who had won it in 1917, until the death of their owner, George Kennedy in October 1921, when the NHL made arrangements to re-use the trophy.

== Coaches ==
- Hamilton Tigers: Joe Malone
- Montreal Canadiens: Newsy Lalonde
- Ottawa Senators: Pete Green
- Toronto St. Patricks: George O'Donoghue

== Debuts ==
The following is a list of players of note who played their first NHL game in 1920–21 (listed with their first team, asterisk(*) marks debut in playoffs):

The last remaining active player to kick off their NHL career this season was Leo Reise, Sr., who played his final NHL game in the 1929–30 season, although he missed the 1924–25 and 1925–26 seasons.

== Last games ==
The following is a list of players of note that played their last game in the NHL in 1920–21 (listed with their last team):

== Free agency ==
Date	Players	Team
February 23, 1921	Leo Reise	Hamilton Tigers

== Transactions ==
November 27, 1920	To Toronto St. Patricks Harry Cameron	To Montreal Canadiens Joe Matte; Goldie Prodgers
November 27, 1920	To Hamilton Tigers Jack Coughlin; Joe Matte; Goldie Prodgers; Loan of Billy Coutu for the 1920-21 Season	To Montreal Canadiens Jack McDonald; Harry Mummery; Dave Ritchie
December 16, 1920	To Hamilton Tigers Howard Lockhart	To Toronto St. Patricks cash
January 4, 1921	To Montreal Canadiens Rights to Punch Broadbent; Rights to Sprague Cleghorn	To Hamilton Tigers cash
January 21, 1921	To Hamilton Tigers Mickey Roach	To Toronto St. Patricks cash
January 25, 1921	To Toronto St. Patricks Sprague Cleghorn	To Hamilton Tigers Future Considerations

== See also ==
- List of Stanley Cup champions
- Pacific Coast Hockey Association
- Ice hockey at the 1920 Summer Olympics
- List of pre-NHL seasons
- 1920 in sports
- 1921 in sports
