= Joe Matte (ice hockey, born 1893) =

Canadian ice hockey player

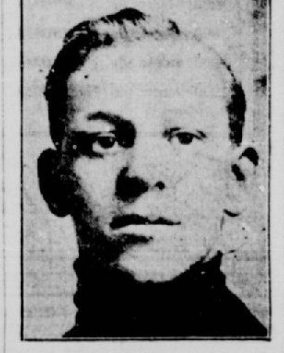
- Born: March 6, 1893 Bourget, Ontario, Canada
- Died: June 13, 1961 (aged 68)
- Height: 5 ft 11 in (180 cm)
- Weight: 165 lb (75 kg; 11 st 11 lb)
- Position: Defence
- Shot: Right
- Played for: Toronto St. Pats; Hamilton Tigers; Boston Bruins; Montreal Canadiens
- Playing career: 1913–1926

Louis Joseph Alexandre Matte (March 6, 1893 – June 13, 1961) was a Canadian professional ice hockey player who played four seasons in the National Hockey League for the Toronto St. Pats, Hamilton Tigers, Boston Bruins and Montreal Canadiens. He also spent two years in the Western Canada Hockey League with the Saskatoon Sheiks and Vancouver Maroons, and one season in the Pacific Coast Hockey Association with the Maroons, retiring in 1926.

== Career statistics ==
=== Regular season and playoffs ===
| | | | Regular season | | | | | Playoffs |
| Season | Team | League | GP | G | A | Pts | PIM | GP | G | A | Pts | PIM |
|---|---|---|---|---|---|---|---|---|---|---|---|---|
| 1913–14 | Montreal Gaiete Canadiens | MCHL | 5 | 3 | 0 | 3 | — | — | — | — | — | — |
| 1914–15 | Vankleek Hill | OVHL | — | — | — | — | — | — | — | — | — | — |
| 1915–16 | Montreal La Casquette | MCHL | 12 | 4 | 0 | 4 | 6 | — | — | — | — | — |
| 1916–17 | Montreal La Casquette | MCHL | 10 | 9 | 0 | 9 | 12 | — | — | — | — | — |
| 1917–18 | Montreal Hochelaga | MCHL | 11 | 23 | 3 | 26 | 9 | 3 | 6 | 1 | 7 | — |
| 1918–19 | Hamilton Tigers | OHA | 8 | 12 | 5 | 17 | — | 4 | 2 | 1 | 3 | — |
| 1918–19 | Hamilton Tigers | Al-Cup | — | — | — | — | — | 2 | 2 | 0 | 2 | 0 |
| 1919–20 | Hamilton Tigers | OHA | 1 | 0 | 1 | 1 | 0 | — | — | — | — | — |
| 1919–20 | Toronto St. Pats | NHL | 17 | 8 | 3 | 11 | 19 | — | — | — | — | — |
| 1920–21 | Hamilton Tigers | NHL | 21 | 6 | 9 | 15 | 29 | — | — | — | — | — |
| 1921–22 | Hamilton Tigers | NHL | 21 | 3 | 3 | 6 | 6 | — | — | — | — | — |
| 1922–23 | Saskatoon Sheiks | WCHL | 29 | 14 | 6 | 20 | 25 | — | — | — | — | — |
| 1923–24 | Vancouver Maroons | PCHA | 29 | 11 | 4 | 15 | 14 | 2 | 1 | 0 | 1 | 2 |
| 1923–24 | Vancouver Maroons | West-PO | — | — | — | — | — | 3 | 0 | 1 | 1 | 4 |
| 1923–24 | Vancouver Maroons | St-Cup | — | — | — | — | — | 2 | 1 | 0 | 1 | 2 |
| 1924–25 | Vancouver Maroons | WCHL | 24 | 8 | 1 | 9 | 20 | — | — | — | — | — |
| 1925–26 | Boston Bruins | NHL | 3 | 0 | 0 | 0 | 0 | — | — | — | — | — |
| 1925–26 | Montreal Canadiens | NHL | 6 | 0 | 0 | 0 | 0 | — | — | — | — | — |
| NHL totals | | | 68 | 17 | 15 | 32 | 54 | — | — | — | — | — |
