= Harry Mummery =

Canadian ice hockey player (1889-1945)

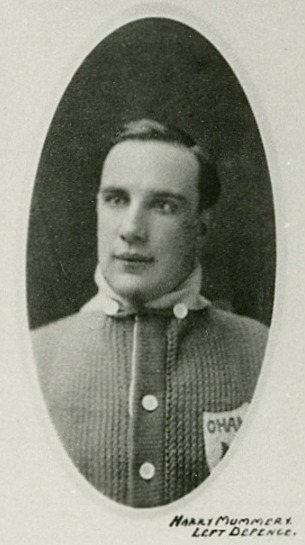
- Mummery with the Toronto Arenas.
- Born: August 25, 1889 Chicago, Illinois, U.S.
- Died: December 9, 1945 (aged 56) Brandon, Manitoba, Canada
- Height: 5 ft 11 in (180 cm)
- Weight: 220 lb (100 kg; 15 st 10 lb)
- Position: Defence
- Shot: Left
- Played for: Quebec Bulldogs; Montreal Canadiens; Torontos; Toronto Arenas; Hamilton Tigers; Saskatoon Crescents
- Playing career: 1911–1923

Harold "Mum" Mummery (August 25, 1889 – December 9, 1945) was a Canadian professional ice hockey defenceman. Mummery played professionally from 1911 until 1923, including six seasons in the National Hockey League (NHL) for the Toronto Arenas, Quebec Bulldogs, Montreal Canadiens and Hamilton Tigers. He was a three-time O'Brien Cup champion and a two-time winner of the Stanley Cup. Mummery's six assists as an NHL rookie in the 1918 Stanley Cup Final set an NHL-era record still unbroken.

At the time of his career, Mummery was the largest player ever in the NHA and NHL, playing at 245 pounds in his NHL years and he was known to eat two steaks before hockey games. Mummery appeared in three games as an NHL goaltender in an era when teams didn't dress a backup netminder, making him the skater to have played the most games in net. He suited up as a goaltender twice with Quebec and once with Hamilton.

== Playing career ==
Born in Chicago, Mummery moved to Brandon, Manitoba at an early age. He first played hockey at the senior level for the Brandon Elks in 1907–08. From there he moved to Fort William, Ontario to play a season with the Fort William Forts in the Northern Ontario Hockey League. He returned to the prairies playing for Brandon and Moose Jaw in minor professional leagues.

In 1912, Mummery joined the Quebec Bulldogs of the National Hockey Association (NHA). In his rookie season, the Bulldogs won the O'Brien Cup and successfully defended the Stanley Cup championship. On the Bulldogs he formed a successful defence pairing with Joe Hall. He played with the Bulldogs until he was traded to the Montreal Canadiens in 1916. The Canadiens won the O'Brien Cup that season but lost to the Seattle Metropolitans in the Stanley Cup championship.

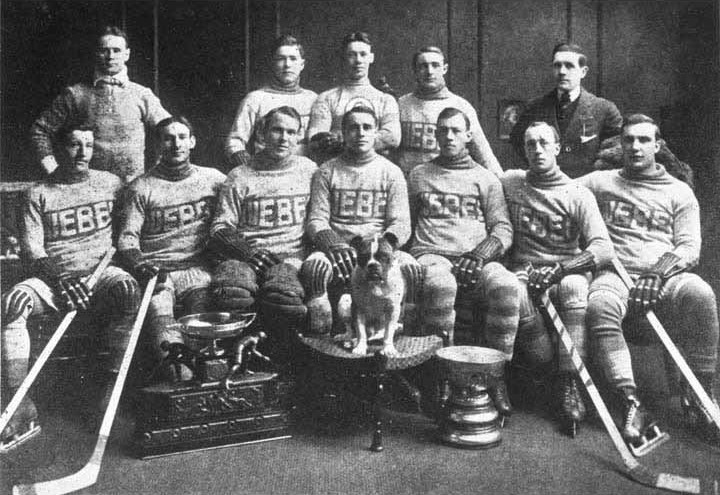
Mummery, sitting at far right, with the 1912–13 Quebec Bulldogs and the Stanley Cup.

Before the beginning of the 1917–18 season, the NHA ceased operations and the owners formed the National Hockey League (NHL). The players from the Quebec Bulldogs were dispersed to teams in the new NHL and Mummery was loaned to the Toronto Blueshirts club, now run by the Toronto Arena Company. The club would go on to win the Stanley Cup in a challenge series against the Vancouver Millionaires of the PCHA. After the season the Arena company formed the Toronto Arena Hockey Club and Mummery signed for the 1918–19 season. Unfortunately, the Arenas only managed to win five of their games throughout the 18-game schedule, and with poor attendance figures the team officially withdrew from the league on February 20, 1919.

In 1919–20 the Quebec Bulldogs returned and joined the NHL making it a four-team league once again. The NHL reassigned former Bulldogs players from the NHA, who were now playing in the NHL, back to the team, including Mummery. When the Quebec team was sold at the end of the 1919–20 season and transferred to Hamilton, Mummery was traded to the Montreal Canadiens where he played the 1920–21 NHL season. He was traded back to the Hamilton Tigers before the start of the 1921–22 season, playing parts of two seasons there before another trade in 1923 sent him to the Saskatoon Sheiks of the West Coast Hockey League. He played four games for Saskatoon in 1922–23 and retired.

He died in Brandon, Manitoba on December 9, 1945.

== Playing style ==
Harry Mummery was one of the heaviest players of his time, his weight reportedly ranging somewhere between 220 and 250 pounds. According to the Canadian sports journalist Elmer Ferguson, who first saw Mummery play at the Westmount Arena in Montreal, the big defenceman had a prodigious appetite for food and a particular fondness of large steaks and cream. Ferguson claimed that Mummery had testified to drinking a quart of cream after every meal because he figured that it gave him strength.

Mummery, although not one of the most prominent offensive defenders of his era, still had a decent goal-scoring upside. During the 1920–21 NHL season he scored 15 goals in 24 games for the Montreal Canadiens, many of them from what Elmer Ferguson referred to as a "one-man-power-play."

== Career statistics ==
=== Regular season and playoffs ===
			Regular season					Playoffs
Season	Team	League	GP	G	A	Pts	PIM	GP	G	A	Pts	PIM
1907–08	Brandon Elks	MHA	—	—	—	—	—	—	—	—	—	—
1908–09	Fort William Forts	NOHL	12	3	0	3	—	1	0	0	0	—
1909–10	Fort William Forts	NOHL	—	—	—	—	—	—	—	—	—	—
1910–11	Brandon Shamrocks	MIPHL	5	1	0	1	—	—	—	—	—	—
1911–12	Moose Jaw Brewers	Sask-Pro	8	1	0	1	—	—	—	—	—	—
1912–13	Quebec Bulldogs	NHA	19	5	0	5	87	—	—	—	—	—
1912–13	Quebec Bulldogs	St-Cup	—	—	—	—	—	2	1	0	1	0
1913–14	Quebec Bulldogs	NHA	20	8	5	13	29	—	—	—	—	—
1914–15	Quebec Bulldogs	NHA	20	7	4	11	88	—	—	—	—	—
1915–16	Quebec Bulldogs	NHA	23	2	1	3	84	—	—	—	—	—
1916–17	Montreal Canadiens	NHA	20	5	3	8	101	2	0	0	0	18
1916–17	Montreal Canadiens	St-Cup	—	—	—	—	—	4	0	0	0	25
1917–18	Toronto Arenas	NHL	18	3	3	6	41	2	1	1	2	17
1917–18	Toronto Arenas	St-Cup	—	—	—	—	—	5	0	6	6	21
1918–19	Toronto Arenas	NHL	13	2	0	2	30	—	—	—	—	—
1919–20	Quebec Bulldogs	NHL	24	9	9	18	42	—	—	—	—	—
1920–21	Montreal Canadiens	NHL	24	15	5	20	69	—	—	—	—	—
1921–22	Hamilton Tigers	NHL	20	4	2	6	40	—	—	—	—	—
1922–23	Hamilton Tigers	NHL	7	0	0	0	4	—	—	—	—	—
1922–23	Saskatoon Sheiks	WCHL	4	0	0	0	2	—	—	—	—	—
NHA totals			102	27	13	40	389	2	0	0	0	18
NHL totals			106	33	19	52	226	2	1	1	2	17

=== Goaltender stats ===
			Regular season								Playoffs
Season	Team	League	GP	W	L	T	Min	GA	SO	GAA	GP	W	L	T	Min	GA	SO	GAA
1919–20	Quebec Bulldogs	NHL	3	1	1	0	142	18	0	7.61	—	—	—	—	—	—	—	—
1921–22	Hamilton Tigers	NHL	1	1	0	0	50	2	0	2.34	—	—	—	—	—	—	—	—
NHL totals			4	2	1	0	192	20	0	6.00	—	—	—	—	—	—	—	—

== Awards and achievements ==
- Stanley Cup championships (1913 with Quebec, & 1918 with Toronto)
- O'Brien Cup NHA championships (1913 with Quebec & 1917 with Montreal Canadiens)
- NHL championship (1918 with Toronto Arenas)
- Honoured Member of the Manitoba Hockey Hall of Fame

== Records (1) ==
- Most assists, rookie, Stanley Cup Final series: 6 in the 1918 Stanley Cup Final (tied with Ville Leino)
