= 1922–23 Ottawa Senators season =

National Hockey League team season

1922–23 Ottawa Senators
- Stanley Cup champions
- O'Brien Trophy winners
- League: 1st NHL
- 1922–23 record: 14–9–1
- Home record: 11–0–1
- Road record: 3–9–0
- Goals for: 77
- Goals against: 54

Team information
- General manager: Tommy Gorman
- Coach: Pete Green
- Captain: Eddie Gerard
- Arena: The Arena

Team leaders
- Goals: Cy Denneny (21)
- Assists: Cy Denneny (10)
- Points: Cy Denneny (31)
- Penalty minutes: Buck Boucher (44)
- Wins: Clint Benedict (14)
- Goals against average: Clint Benedict (2.18)

The 1922–23 Ottawa Senators season was the club's 38th season of play and sixth season in the NHL. They were coming off a disappointing playoff run in 1922, as they lost to the Toronto St. Pats in the NHL finals in a close, hard-fought series. The Senators would finish first in the standings, defeat Montreal in the playoffs, defeat Vancouver in the Stanley Cup semi-finals and defeat Edmonton to win their tenth Stanley Cup title.

== Regular season ==
Cy Denneny would once again have a strong season, scoring a team high 21 goals, and finishing 2nd in the NHL with 31 points. On February 7, Denneny would score his 143rd career goal, surpassing Joe Malone as the all-time goal scoring leader in a 3–0 Senators win over the Montreal Canadiens.

Defenceman Buck Boucher would get a career high 24 points (15 goals-9 assists), and would lead the club with 44 PIM.

Clint Benedict would once again have a very solid season, leading the league with 14 wins, 4 shutouts and a 2.18 GAA.

=== December ===
- **December 16** – The Senators opened the 1922–23 season on the road at Barton Street Arena against the Hamilton Tigers. Cy Denneny scored two goals, however, Goldie Prodgers of the Tigers scored in overtime, as the Senators dropped a close game 4–3 to Hamilton.
- **December 20** – Ottawa hosted the Toronto St. Patricks for their home opener. Eddie Gerard scored two goals and an assist and Georges Boucher had one goal and three assists, leading Ottawa to their first victory of the season by a 7–2 score.
- **December 23** – Ottawa travelled to Mount Royal Arena for the first time during the season for a road game against the Montreal Canadiens. Cy Denneny scored a goal and added an assist. Clint Benedict stopped every shot from the Canadiens, as Ottawa shutout Montreal 3–0.
- **December 27** – In their first game after Christmas, the Senators hosted the Montreal Canadiens for the second game of a home-and-home series. Ottawa took a 2–0 lead after two goals by Frank Nighbor, but the Canadiens came back to tie the game. Overtime would solve nothing, as the game ended in a 2–2 draw.
- **December 30** – The Senators hosted the Hamilton Tigers for their final game of the month. Frank Nighbor scored twice, while Clint Benedict provided solid goaltending, as Ottawa defeated Hamilton 4–1.

The Senators finished with a 3–1–1 record in the month of December, earning seven points. Ottawa was in first place in the NHL standings, two points ahead of the second place Montreal Canadiens.

=== January ===
- **January 3** – Ottawa opened the new year on the road with a game at Mutual Street Arena against the Toronto St. Patricks. The two teams were tied 2–2 following regulation, as Cy Denneny scored twice for the Senators. In overtime, Babe Dye scored for Toronto to end the Senators four game unbeaten streak as the St. Patricks won the game 3–2.
- **January 6** – The Senators hosted the Toronto St. Patricks in Ottawa. Punch Broadbent scored both goals for the Senators and Clint Benedict provided excellent goaltending as the Senators defeated Toronto 2–1.
- **January 10** – The Montreal Canadiens were the next team to visit Ottawa. Punch Broadbent scored three goals, while Cy Denneny scored twice and added an assist, as the Senators easily defeated the Canadiens 6–2.
- **January 13** – Ottawa played a road game against the Hamilton Tigers. The Tigers were all over the Senators, as Cully Wilson led the way with three goals. Jack Darragh scored the lone goal for Ottawa, as Hamilton won the game 8–1.
- **January 17** – Ottawa travelled for a road game against the Montreal Canadiens. The Senators road woes continued, as Punch Broadbent scored the lone goal for Ottawa in a 2–1 loss. This was the third straight road game that the Senators had lost.
- **January 20** – Ottawa returned to home ice for a matchup against the Hamilton Tigers. The Senators snapped their two-game losing streak, as Georges Boucher and Frank Nighbor each scored and Clint Benedict earned the shutout, as Ottawa defeated Hamilton 2–0. The win improved Ottawa's home record of 5–0–1.
- **January 24** – Ottawa was back on the road for a game against the Toronto St. Patricks. Cy Denneny scored the lone goal for Ottawa, as Reg Noble of the St. Patricks scored the overtime winner, as the Senators dropped a 2–1 decision to Toronto.
- **January 27** – The Senators continued their road trip as they faced the Hamilton Tigers. Hamilton stormed out to a 4–0 lead in the first period, but Ottawa fought back, taking a 5–4 lead in the third period. The Tigers tied the game with a late goal, sending it into overtime. In the extra period, Punch Broadbent scored, as Ottawa won the game 6–5 and snapped their four-game road losing streak. Eddie Gerard and Georges Boucher each scored twice in the victory.
- **January 31** – Ottawa returned to home ice for a game against the Toronto St. Patricks. Frank Nighbor and Jack Darragh each scored powerplay goals as the Senators edged the St. Patricks 2–1.

The club earned a record of 5–4–0 in nine games played in January. Overall, Ottawa had a win–loss record of 8–5–1 at the end of the month, earning 17 points, and hanging onto first place in the NHL, one point ahead of the second place Montreal Canadiens.

=== February ===
- **February 3** – The Senators opened February on the road against the Montreal Canadiens for a battle of first place in the NHL standings. Jack Darragh scored the lone goal for Ottawa, as Odie Cleghorn scored two for the Canadiens as Montreal won the game 4–1. The loss dropped the Senators into second place, one point behind the Canadiens.
- **February 7** – Ottawa and the Montreal Canadiens faced off again, this time in Ottawa. Georges Boucher scored twice and added an assist, while Clint Benedict earned the shutout, as the Senators regained first place in the NHL standings with a 3–0 victory. The win improved the Senators home record to 7–0–1.
- **February 10** – Ottawa hosted the struggling Hamilton Tigers, who were on a six-game losing streak. The Senators, led by Georges Boucher, Cy Denneny and Eddie Gerard, who each scored two goals, overpowered the Tigers to a 8–3 victory.
- **February 14** – The Senators were on the road for a game against the Toronto St. Patricks. Toronto took a 5–0 lead late into the second period, however, the Senators made the game interesting before falling short by a score of 6–4. Frank Nighbor led the Senators with two goals.
- **February 17** – Ottawa returned home for a matchup against the Montreal Canadiens. Georges Boucher and Cy Denneny each scored third period goals. Clint Benedict earned his fourth shutout of the season, as the Senators defeated the Canadiens 2–0.
- **February 21** – The Senators faced off against the Toronto St. Patricks for a home game. Cy Denneny scored four goals and Punch Broadbent scored twice, as Ottawa easily defeated Toronto 6–1.
- **February 24** – Ottawa travelled to Hamilton for a game against the Hamilton Tigers. Cy Denneny recorded his second straight four goal game, as the Senators beat the Tigers 5–1.
- **February 28** – The Senators concluded the month of February with a home game against the Hamilton Tigers. The Tigers took a 2–0 lead in the first period, but the Senators stormed back to win the game 6–3. Georges Boucher scored three goals while Cy Denneny scored a goal and added three assists in the victory. With the win, the Senators clinched first place in the NHL standings and a berth in the O'Brien Cup finals.

Ottawa finished February with a 6–2–0 record during eight games. Overall, the Senators record was 14–7–1, earning 29 points, as the club had clinched first place in the NHL standings, earning a berth in the NHL finals.

=== March ===
- **March 3** – Ottawa began March with a road game against the Montreal Canadiens. Billy Boucher of the Canadiens scored the only goal of the game, as Georges Vezina earned the shutout for Montreal in a 1–0 Senators loss.
- **March 5** – The Senators concluded the regular season with a road game against the Toronto St. Patricks. The Senators, resting some of their players, were once again shutout, as Toronto won the game 2–0. Harry Cameron scored both goals for the St. Patricks and John Ross Roach earned the shutout.

Ottawa had a 0–2–0 record in two games in March. Overall, the Senators finished the season 14–9–1, earning 29 points and finishing in first place in the NHL standings.

=== Final standings ===
National Hockey League
	GP	W	L	T	Pts	GF	GA
**Ottawa Senators**	24	14	9	1	29	77	54
**Montreal Canadiens**	24	13	9	2	28	73	61
Toronto St. Patricks	24	13	10	1	27	82	88
Hamilton Tigers	24	6	18	0	12	81	110

Note: GP = Games played, W = Wins, L = Losses, T = Ties, Pts = Points, GF = Goals for, GA = Goals against
Teams that qualified for the playoffs are highlighted in bold.

=== Record vs. opponents ===
1922–23 NHL Records
Team	HAM	MTL	OTT	TOR
Hamilton	—	2–6	2–6	2–6
Montreal	6–2	—	3–4–1	4–3–1
Ottawa	6–2	4–3–1	—	4–4
Toronto	6–2	3–4–1	4–4	—

== Playoffs ==
=== Ottawa Senators 3, Montreal Canadiens 2 ===
In the NHL finals, the Senators would face the Montreal Canadiens in a two-game total-goals series to determine the O'Brien Cup winner.

The Senators opened the series on the road at the Mount Royal Arena in Montreal on March 7. After a goalless first period, the Senators Cy Denneny opened the scoring in the second period on the powerplay, giving Ottawa a 1–0 lead after two periods. In the third period, Jack Darragh put Ottawa up 2–0 on another powerplay goal, as Clint Benedict stopped every shot that he faced, as Ottawa shutout the Canadiens 2–0.

The series concluded two nights later in Ottawa, with the Senators leading the total-goals series 2–0. Montreal came out firing in the first period, as Aurel Joliat and Billy Boucher each scored for the Canadiens, as they took a 2–0 lead after the first period. After no scoring in the second period, it was the Senators Cy Denneny scoring midway through the third period, as despite the 2–1 loss in the second game, the Senators won the total-goals series 3–2.

=== Ottawa Senators 3, Vancouver Maroons 1 ===
The Maroons lost to the Edmonton Eskimos in the WCHL Finals, so they would have to face Ottawa, with the winner of this series playing Edmonton for the Stanley Cup. The series was played at Denman Arena in Vancouver.

The series opened on March 16 in Vancouver. The Senators and Maroons played a tightly defensive game, as the game remained tied 0–0 after two periods. In the third period, the Senators Punch Broadbent broke the scoreless tie, as Ottawa held on to win the game 1–0 and take the series opener. Goaltender Clint Benedict recorded the shutout for the Senators.

In the second game played on March 19, the Maroons broke out of their scoring slump, scoring three goals in the first period to take a 3–0 lead, as Frank Boucher scored twice for Vancouver, while Art Duncan scored the other goal. Duncan scored his second goal of the game in the second period, extending Vancouver's lead to 4–0. In the third period, Ottawa's Georges Boucher broke the shutout, however, Vancouver won the game 4–1 and evened the series up at one game each.

The third game of the series was played on March 23. Vancouver opened the scoring on a goal by Alf Skinner, however, the Senators Punch Broadbent scored twice, as Ottawa took a 2–1 lead into the first intermission. Mickey MacKay of the Maroons tied the game with a goal late in the second period, as Ottawa and Vancouver were tied 2–2 after two periods. In the third period, the Senators Frank Nighbor scored a goal 2:13 into the period, as Ottawa hung on to defeat the Maroons 3–2 and re-take the series lead.

The fourth game was played on March 26 and was a must-win for the Maroons. The Senators struck first, as Georges Boucher and Eddie Gerard scored to give Ottawa a 2–0 lead after the first period. Ottawa's Punch Broadbent scored the lone goal of the second period, extending the Senators lead to 3–0 after two periods. The Senators King Clancy scored midway through the third period, as Ottawa took a 4–0 lead. The Maroons were finally able to beat Clint Benedict with just over three minutes remaining in the game on a goal by Smokey Harris. Ottawa's Punch Broadbent scored his second goal of the game with just four seconds remaining, as the Senators won the game 5–1 and won the series.

=== Ottawa Senators 2, Edmonton Eskimos 0 ===
The 1923 Stanley Cup Finals would be a best of three series between Ottawa and Edmonton. The series was played at Denman Arena in Vancouver.

The series opened on March 29, as the two clubs skated to a scoreless first period. The Eskimos opened the scoring in the second period, as Crutchy Morrison scored midway through the period, giving Edmonton a 1–0 lead. In the third period, the Senators Lionel Hitchman tied the game 13:04 into the period, sending the game into overtime. In the extra period, the Senators Cy Denneny scored just 2:08 into overtime, giving the Senators a 2–1 victory and taking the first game of the series.

The second game of the series was played two nights later, on March 31. Ottawa's Punch Broadbent scored a powerplay goal midway through the first period to give Ottawa a 1–0 lead. In the second period, Senators goaltender Clint Benedict took a two-minute penalty, as King Clancy took his spot in goal for the two minutes. The Eskimos were unable to score on the powerplay. In the third period, the Eskimos were unable to beat Benedict, as Ottawa won the game 1–0 and won the 1923 Stanley Cup by sweeping Edmonton in two games.

=== Victorious return to Ottawa ===
The Senators returned home on Friday, April 6, 1923, from Vancouver. Greeted by Ottawa Mayor Plant, and accompanied by the Governor-Generals Foot Guards and the Ottawa Silver Band, the team paraded through Ottawa's downtown streets. A banquet was held for the team on Monday, April 19, where each of the ten team members received a gold watch. According to Mayor Plant, "this is a citizens' banquet, not a civic one, as the citizens believe you have given Ottawa the best advertising it has ever had."

== Schedule and results ==
=== Regular season ===
1922–23 regular season
December: 3–1–1 (home: 2–0–1; road: 1–1–0)

Game	Date	Visitor	Score	Home	OT	Decision	Attendance	Arena	Record	Pts
1	December 16	Ottawa	3–4	Hamilton		Benedict	N/A	Barton Street Arena	0–1–0	0
2	December 20	Toronto	2–7	Ottawa		Benedict	N/A	The Arena	1–1–0	2
3	December 23	Ottawa	3–0	Montreal		Benedict	N/A	Mount Royal Arena	2–1–0	4
4	December 27	Montreal	2–2	Ottawa		Benedict	N/A	The Arena	2–1–1	5
5	December 30	Hamilton	1–4	Ottawa		Benedict	N/A	The Arena	3–1–1	7

January: 5–4–0 (home: 4–0–0; road: 1–4–0)

Game	Date	Visitor	Score	Home	OT	Decision	Attendance	Arena	Record	Pts
6	January 3	Ottawa	2–3	Toronto	OT	Benedict	N/A	Arena Gardens	3–2–1	7
7	January 6	Toronto	1–2	Ottawa		Benedict	N/A	The Arena	4–2–1	9
8	January 10	Montreal	2–6	Ottawa		Benedict	N/A	The Arena	5–2–1	11
9	January 13	Ottawa	1–8	Hamilton		Benedict	N/A	Barton Street Arena	5–3–1	11
10	January 17	Ottawa	1–2	Montreal		Benedict	N/A	Mount Royal Arena	5–4–1	11
11	January 20	Hamilton	0–2	Ottawa		Benedict	N/A	The Arena	6–4–1	13
12	January 24	Ottawa	1–2	Toronto	OT	Benedict	N/A	Arena Gardens	6–5–1	13
13	January 27	Ottawa	6–5	Hamilton	OT	Benedict	N/A	Barton Street Arena	7–5–1	15
14	January 31	Toronto	1–2	Ottawa		Benedict	N/A	The Arena	8–5–1	17

February: 6–2–0 (home: 5–0–0; road: 1–2–0)

Game	Date	Visitor	Score	Home	OT	Decision	Attendance	Arena	Record	Pts
15	February 3	Ottawa	1–4	Montreal		Benedict	N/A	Mount Royal Arena	8–6–1	17
16	February 7	Montreal	0–3	Ottawa		Benedict	N/A	The Arena	9–6–1	19
17	February 10	Hamilton	3–8	Ottawa		Benedict	N/A	The Arena	10–6–1	21
18	February 14	Ottawa	4–6	Toronto		Benedict	N/A	Arena Gardens	10–7–1	21
19	February 17	Montreal	0–2	Ottawa		Benedict	N/A	The Arena	11–7–1	23
20	February 21	Toronto	1–6	Ottawa		Benedict	N/A	The Arena	12–7–1	25
21	February 24	Ottawa	5–1	Hamilton		Benedict	N/A	Barton Street Arena	13–7–1	27
22	February 28	Hamilton	3–6	Ottawa		Benedict	N/A	The Arena	14–7–1	29

March: 0–2–0 (home: 0–0–0; road: 0–2–0)

Game	Date	Visitor	Score	Home	OT	Decision	Attendance	Arena	Record	Pts
23	March 3	Ottawa	0–1	Montreal		Benedict	N/A	Mount Royal Arena	14–8–1	29
24	March 5	Ottawa	0–2	Toronto		Benedict	N/A	Arena Gardens	14–9–1	29

Legend: Win (2 points) Loss (0 points) Tie (1 point)

=== Playoffs ===
1923 Stanley Cup playoffs
NHL championship vs. (2) Montreal Canadiens – Senators win 3 goals to 2 goals

Game	Date	Visitor	Score	Home	OT	Decision	Attendance	Arena	Series
1	March 7	Ottawa	2–0	Montreal		Benedict	N/A	Mount Royal Arena	2–0
2	March 9	Montreal	2–1	Ottawa		Benedict	N/A	The Arena	3–2

Stanley Cup Semifinals vs. Vancouver Maroons – Senators win 3–1

Game	Date	Visitor	Score	Home	OT	Decision	Attendance	Arena	Series
1	March 16	Ottawa	1–0	Vancouver		Benedict	N/A	Denman Arena	1–0
2	March 19	Ottawa	1–4	Vancouver		Benedict	N/A	Denman Arena	1–1
3	March 23	Ottawa	3–2	Vancouver		Benedict	N/A	Denman Arena	2–1
4	March 26	Ottawa	5–1	Vancouver		Benedict	N/A	Denman Arena	3–1

Stanley Cup Finals vs. Edmonton Eskimos – Senators win 2–0

Game	Date	Visitor	Score	Home	OT	Decision	Attendance	Arena	Series
1	March 29	Ottawa	2–1	Edmonton	OT	Benedict	N/A	Denman Arena	1–0
2	March 31	Ottawa	1–0	Edmonton		Benedict	N/A	Denman Arena	2–0

Legend: Win Loss Tie

== Player statistics ==
=== Regular season ===
Scoring

Player	GP	G	A	Pts	PIM
Cy Denneny	24	23	11	34	28
Georges Boucher	24	14	9	23	58
Eddie Gerard	23	6	13	19	12
Frank Nighbor	22	11	7	18	14
Punch Broadbent	24	14	1	15	34
Jack Darragh	24	6	9	15	10
King Clancy	24	3	2	5	20
Lionel Hitchman	3	0	1	1	12
Clint Benedict	24	0	0	0	2
Harry Helman	24	0	0	0	5

Goaltending

Player	MIN	GP	W	L	T	GA	GAA	SA	SV	SV%	SO
Clint Benedict	1486	24	14	9	1	54	2.18				4
Team:	1486	24	14	9	1	54	2.18				4

Note:

Pos = Position;GP = Games played; G = Goals; A = Assists; Pts = Points; PIM = Penalty minutes; +/- = Plus/minus; PPG = Power-play goals; SHG = Short-handed goals; GWG = Game-winning goals
Pos = Position;GP = Games played; Min, TOI = Minutes played; W = Wins; L = Losses; T,T/OT = Ties; OTL = Overtime losses; GA = Goals-against; GAA = Goals-against average; SO = Shutouts; SA = Shots against; SV = Shots saved;SV% = Save percentage;

== Transactions ==
The Senators were involved in the following transactions during the 1922–23 season.

=== Trades ===
September 19, 1922	To Ottawa Senators Cash	To Vancouver Maroons (PCHA) Frank Boucher

=== Free agents signed ===
November 16, 1922	From Ottawa Munitions (OCHL) Harry Helman
December 4, 1922	Did not play in 1921–22 Jack Darragh
February 28, 1923	From Ottawa New Edinburghs (OCHL) Lionel Hitchman

=== Free agents lost ===
November 15, 1922	To Hamilton Tigers Leth Graham

== See also ==
- 1922–23 NHL season
- List of Stanley Cup champions
