= 1922–23 Montreal Canadiens season =

NHL hockey team season

1922–23 Montreal Canadiens
- League: 2nd NHL
- 1922–23 record: 13–9–2 (28 points)
- Home record: 10–2–0
- Road record: 3–7–2
- Goals for: 73
- Goals against: 61

Team information
- General manager: Leo Dandurand
- Coach: Leo Dandurand
- Captain: Sprague Cleghorn
- Arena: Mount Royal Arena

Team leaders
- Goals: Billy Boucher (23)
- Assists: Aurel Joliat (10)
- Points: Billy Boucher (29)
- Penalty minutes: Billy Boucher (55)
- Wins: Georges Vezina (13)
- Goals against average: Georges Vezina (2.46)

The 1922–23 Montreal Canadiens season was the team's sixth season in the NHL and 14th overall. The Canadiens finished second in the league and reached the NHL finals, losing to the eventual Stanley Cup champions, the Ottawa Senators. It also marked the debut of Aurèle Joliat, who would spend the next sixteen years with the club.

== Regular season ==
=== Final standings ===
National Hockey League
	GP	W	L	T	Pts	GF	GA
**Ottawa Senators**	24	14	9	1	29	77	54
**Montreal Canadiens**	24	13	9	2	28	73	61
Toronto St. Patricks	24	13	10	1	27	82	88
Hamilton Tigers	24	6	18	0	12	81	110

Note: GP = Games played, W = Wins, L = Losses, T = Ties, Pts = Points, GF = Goals for, GA = Goals against
Teams that qualified for the playoffs are highlighted in bold.

=== Record vs. opponents ===
1922–23 NHL Records
Team	HAM	MTL	OTT	TOR
Hamilton	—	2–6	2–6	2–6
Montreal	6–2	—	3–4–1	4–3–1
Ottawa	6–2	4–3–1	—	4–4
Toronto	6–2	3–4–1	4–4	—

== Schedule and results ==
1922–23 regular season
December: 2–2–1 (home: 2–1–0; road: 0–1–1)

Game	Date	Visitor	Score	Home	Record	Pts
1	December 16	Montreal	2–7	Toronto	0–1–0	0
2	December 20	Hamilton	3–7	Montreal	1–1–0	2
3	December 23	Ottawa	3–0	Montreal	1–2–0	2
4	December 27	Montreal	2–2	Ottawa	1–2–1	3
5	December 30	Toronto	2–8	Montreal	2–2–1	5

January: 5–3–1 (home: 3–1–0; road: 2–2–1)

Game	Date	Visitor	Score	Home	Record	Pts
6	January 3	Montreal	4–1	Hamilton	3–2–1	7
7	January 6	Hamilton	3–2	Montreal	3–3–1	7
8	January 10	Montreal	2–6	Ottawa	3–4–1	7
9	January 13	Montreal	2–2	Toronto	3–4–2	8
10	January 17	Ottawa	1–2	Montreal	4–4–2	10
11	January 20	Toronto	1–3	Montreal	5–4–2	12
12	January 24	Montreal	5–1	Hamilton	6–4–2	14
13	January 27	Montreal	2–4	Toronto	6–5–2	14
14	January 31	Hamilton	4–5	Montreal	7–5–2	16

February: 4–4–0 (home: 4–0–0; road: 0–4–0)

Game	Date	Visitor	Score	Home	Record	Pts
15	February 3	Ottawa	1–4	Montreal	8–5–2	18
16	February 7	Montreal	0–3	Ottawa	8–6–2	18
17	February 10	Toronto	3–5	Montreal	9–6–2	20
18	February 14	Montreal	2–4	Hamilton	9–7–2	20
19	February 17	Montreal	0–2	Ottawa	9–8–2	20
20	February 21	Hamilton	3–5	Montreal	10–8–2	22
21	February 24	Montreal	3–4	Toronto	10–9–2	22
22	February 28	Toronto	0–3	Montreal	11–9–2	24

March: 2–0–0 (home: 1–0–0; road: 1–0–0)

Game	Date	Visitor	Score	Home	Record	Pts
23	March 3	Ottawa	0–1	Montreal	12–9–2	26
24	March 5	Montreal	4–1	Hamilton	13–9–2	28

**Legend**: Win (2 points) Loss (0 points) Tie (1 point)

== Player statistics ==
=== Skaters ===
Note: GP = Games played; G = Goals; A = Assists; Pts = Points; PIM = Penalty minutes

	Regular season					Playoffs
Player	GP	G	A	Pts	PIM	GP	G	A	Pts	PIM
Billy Boucher	24	23	4	27	55	2	1	0	1	2
Odie Cleghorn	24	19	6	25	18	2	0	0	0	2
Aurel Joliat	24	12	9	21	37	2	1	0	1	11
Sprague Cleghorn	24	9	8	17	34	1	0	0	0	7
Billy Coutu	24	5	2	7	37	1	0	0	0	22
Louis Berlinquette	24	2	4	6	4	2	0	2	2	0
Didier Pitre	22	1	2	3	0	2	0	0	0	0
Joe Malone	20	1	0	1	2	2	0	0	0	0
Edmond Bouchard	2	0	0	0	4	–	–	–	–	–
Billy Bell	19	0	0	0	2	2	0	0	0	0

=== Goaltenders ===
Note: GP = Games played; Min = Minutes; W = Wins; L = Losses; T = Ties; GA = Goals against; SO = Shutouts; GAA = Goals against average

	Regular season								Playoffs
Player	GP	Min	W	L	T	GA	SO	GAA	GP	Min	W	L	GA	SO	GAA
Georges Vezina	24	1488	13	9	2	61	2	2.46	2	120	1	1	3	0	1.50

== Playoffs ==
They went against Ottawa for the championship and lost 3 goals to 2, or 2–3.
