= 1922–23 NHL transactions =

== September ==
September 18, 1922	To Saskatoon Crescents (WCHL) Newsy Lalonde	To Montreal Canadiens Aurel Joliat cash ($3,500)
