= 1922–23 Toronto St. Patricks season =

NHL hockey team season

1922–23 Toronto St. Patricks
- League: 3rd NHL
- 1922–23 record: 13–10–1
- Home record: 10–1–1
- Road record: 3–9–0
- Goals for: 82
- Goals against: 88

Team information
- General manager: Charles Querrie
- Coach: George O'Donoghue, Charles Querrie
- Captain: Jack Adams
- Arena: Arena Gardens

Team leaders
- Goals: Babe Dye (27)
- Assists: Babe Dye (13)
- Points: Babe Dye (40)
- Penalty minutes: Jack Adams (66)
- Wins: John Ross Roach (13)
- Goals against average: John Ross Roach (3.59)

The 1922–23 Toronto St. Patricks season was the sixth season of operation of the Toronto National Hockey League (NHL) franchise. The St. Pats failed to repeat as Stanley Cup champions, finishing third and not qualifying for the playoffs for the first time since the 1919–20 season.

== Regular season ==
=== Final standings ===
National Hockey League
	GP	W	L	T	Pts	GF	GA
**Ottawa Senators**	24	14	9	1	29	77	54
**Montreal Canadiens**	24	13	9	2	28	73	61
Toronto St. Patricks	24	13	10	1	27	82	88
Hamilton Tigers	24	6	18	0	12	81	110

Note: GP = Games played, W = Wins, L = Losses, T = Ties, Pts = Points, GF = Goals for, GA = Goals against
Teams that qualified for the playoffs are highlighted in bold.

=== Record vs. opponents ===
1922–23 NHL Records
Team	HAM	MTL	OTT	TOR
Hamilton	—	2–6	2–6	2–6
Montreal	6–2	—	3–4–1	4–3–1
Ottawa	6–2	4–3–1	—	4–4
Toronto	6–2	3–4–1	4–4	—

== Schedule and results ==
1922–23 regular season
December

Game	Result	Date	Score	Opponent	Record
1	W	December 16, 1922	7–2	Montreal Canadiens (1922–23)	1–0–0
2	L	December 20, 1922	2–7	@ Ottawa Senators (1922–23)	1–1–0
3	W	December 23, 1922	9–4	Hamilton Tigers (1922–23)	2–1–0
4	L	December 27, 1922	6–9	@ Hamilton Tigers (1922–23)	2–2–0
5	L	December 30, 1922	2–8	@ Montreal Canadiens (1922–23)	2–3–0

January

Game	Result	Date	Score	Opponent	Record
6	W	January 3, 1923	3–2 OT	Ottawa Senators (1922–23)	3–3–0
7	L	January 6, 1923	1–2	@ Ottawa Senators (1922–23)	3–4–0
8	W	January 10, 1923	7–6 OT	@ Hamilton Tigers (1922–23)	4–4–0
9	T	January 13, 1923	2–2 OT	Montreal Canadiens (1922–23)	4–4–1
10	L	January 17, 1923	2–5	Hamilton Tigers (1922–23)	4–5–1
11	L	January 20, 1923	1–3	@ Montreal Canadiens (1922–23)	4–6–1
12	W	January 24, 1923	2–1 OT	Ottawa Senators (1922–23)	5–6–1
13	W	January 27, 1923	4–2	Montreal Canadiens (1922–23)	6–6–1
14	L	January 31, 1923	1–2	@ Ottawa Senators (1922–23)	6–7–1

February

Game	Result	Date	Score	Opponent	Record
15	W	February 3, 1923	6–5	Hamilton Tigers (1922–23)	7–7–1
16	W	February 7, 1923	4–2	@ Hamilton Tigers (1922–23)	8–7–1
17	L	February 10, 1923	3–5	@ Montreal Canadiens (1922–23)	8–8–1
18	W	February 14, 1923	6–4	Ottawa Senators (1922–23)	9–8–1
19	W	February 17, 1923	3–2	@ Hamilton Tigers (1922–23)	10–8–1
20	L	February 21, 1923	1–6	@ Ottawa Senators (1922–23)	10–9–1
21	W	February 24, 1923	4–3	Montreal Canadiens (1922–23)	11–9–1
22	L	February 28, 1923	0–3	@ Montreal Canadiens (1922–23)	11–10–1

March

Game	Result	Date	Score	Opponent	Record
23	W	March 3, 1923	4–3	Hamilton Tigers (1922–23)	12–10–1
24	W	March 5, 1923	2–0	Ottawa Senators (1922–23)	13–10–1

**Legend**: Win (2 points) Loss (0 points) Tie (1 point)

== Player statistics ==
Regular season
**Scoring**

Player	Pos	GP	G	A	Pts	PIM
Babe Dye	RW	22	26	11	37	19
Jack Adams	C	23	19	9	28	64
Reg Noble	C/D	24	12	11	23	47
Harry Cameron	D	22	9	7	16	27
Billy Stuart	D	23	7	3	10	16
Lloyd Andrews	LW	23	5	4	9	10
Ken Randall	RW/D	24	3	5	8	58
Corb Denneny	C	1	1	0	1	0
Gerry Denoird	C	17	0	1	1	0
John Ross Roach	G	24	0	0	0	0
Ganton Scott	RW	17	0	0	0	0
Rod Smylie	W	2	0	0	0	0

**Goaltending**

Player	MIN	GP	W	L	T	GA	GAA	SO
John Ross Roach	1469	24	13	10	1	88	3.59	1
Team:	1469	24	13	10	1	88	3.59	1

Note:

Pos = Position;GP = Games played; G = Goals; A = Assists; Pts = Points; PIM = Penalty minutes; +/- = Plus/minus; PPG = Power-play goals; SHG = Short-handed goals; GWG = Game-winning goals
Pos = Position;GP = Games played; Min, TOI = Minutes played; W = Wins; L = Losses; T,T/OT = Ties; OTL = Overtime losses; GA = Goals-against; GAA = Goals-against average; SO = Shutouts; SA = Shots against; SV = Shots saved;SV% = Save percentage;

== Transactions ==
- October 9, 1922: Signed Free Agent Ganton Scott
- October 25, 1922: Signed Free Agent Gerry Denoird
- December 18, 1922: Acquired Jack Adams from Vancouver Millionaires (PCHA) for Corbett Denneny

== See also ==
- 1922–23 NHL season
