= 1922–23 Hamilton Tigers season =

National Hockey League team season

1922–23 Hamilton Tigers
- League: 4th NHL
- 1922–23 record: 6–18–0
- Home record: 4–8–0
- Road record: 2–10–0
- Goals for: 81
- Goals against: 110

Team information
- General manager: Percy Thompson
- Coach: Art Ross
- Arena: Barton Street Arena

Team leaders
- Goals: Mickey Roach (17)
- Assists: Edmond Bouchard (15)
- Points: Mickey Roach (26)
- Penalty minutes: Cully Wilson (46)
- Wins: Jake Forbes (6)
- Goals against average: Jake Forbes (4.49)

The 1922–23 Hamilton Tigers season was the third season of the NHL franchise in Hamilton. For the third consecutive season, the Tigers finished last in the standings.

== Regular season ==
=== Final standings ===
National Hockey League
	GP	W	L	T	Pts	GF	GA
**Ottawa Senators**	24	14	9	1	29	77	54
**Montreal Canadiens**	24	13	9	2	28	73	61
Toronto St. Patricks	24	13	10	1	27	82	88
Hamilton Tigers	24	6	18	0	12	81	110

Note: GP = Games played, W = Wins, L = Losses, T = Ties, Pts = Points, GF = Goals for, GA = Goals against
Teams that qualified for the playoffs are highlighted in bold.

=== Record vs. opponents ===
1922–23 NHL Records
Team	HAM	MTL	OTT	TOR
Hamilton	—	2–6	2–6	2–6
Montreal	6–2	—	3–4–1	4–3–1
Ottawa	6–2	4–3–1	—	4–4
Toronto	6–2	3–4–1	4–4	—

== Schedule and results ==
1922–23 regular season
December

Game	Result	Date	Score	Opponent	Record
1	W	December 16, 1922	4–3	Ottawa Senators (1922–23)	1–0–0
2	L	December 20, 1922	3–7	@ Montreal Canadiens (1922–23)	1–1–0
3	L	December 23, 1922	4–9	@ Toronto St. Patricks (1922–23)	1–2–0
4	W	December 27, 1922	9–6	Toronto St. Patricks (1922–23)	2–2–0
5	L	December 30, 1922	1–4	@ Ottawa Senators (1922–23)	2–3–0

January

Game	Result	Date	Score	Opponent	Record
6	L	January 3, 1923	1–4	Montreal Canadiens (1922–23)	2–4–0
7	W	January 6, 1923	3–2 OT	@ Montreal Canadiens (1922–23)	3–4–0
8	L	January 10, 1923	6–7 OT	Toronto St. Patricks (1922–23)	3–5–0
9	W	January 13, 1923	8–1	Ottawa Senators (1922–23)	4–5–0
10	W	January 17, 1923	5–2	@ Toronto St. Patricks (1922–23)	5–5–0
11	L	January 20, 1923	0–2	@ Ottawa Senators (1922–23)	5–6–0
12	L	January 24, 1923	1–5	Montreal Canadiens (1922–23)	5–7–0
13	L	January 27, 1923	5–6 OT	Ottawa Senators (1922–23)	5–8–0
14	L	January 31, 1923	4–5	@ Montreal Canadiens (1922–23)	5–9–0

February

Game	Result	Date	Score	Opponent	Record
15	L	February 3, 1923	5–6	@ Toronto St. Patricks (1922–23)	5–10–0
16	L	February 7, 1923	2–4	Toronto St. Patricks (1922–23)	5–11–0
17	L	February 10, 1923	3–8	@ Ottawa Senators (1922–23)	5–12–0
18	W	February 14, 1923	4–2	Montreal Canadiens (1922–23)	6–12–0
19	L	February 17, 1923	2–3	Toronto St. Patricks (1922–23)	6–13–0
20	L	February 21, 1923	3–5	@ Montreal Canadiens (1922–23)	6–14–0
21	L	February 24, 1923	1–5	Ottawa Senators (1922–23)	6–15–0
22	L	February 28, 1923	3–6	@ Ottawa Senators (1922–23)	6–16–0

March

Game	Result	Date	Score	Opponent	Record
23	L	March 3, 1923	3–4	@ Toronto St. Patricks (1922–23)	6–17–0
24	L	March 5, 1923	1–4	Montreal Canadiens (1922–23)	6–18–0

**Legend**: Win (2 points) Loss (0 points) Tie (1 point)

== Player statistics ==
Regular season
**Scoring**

Player	Pos	GP	G	A	Pts	PIM
Mickey Roach	C	24	17	10	27	8
Cully Wilson	RW	23	16	5	21	46
Goldie Prodgers	F/D	23	13	4	17	17
Edmond Bouchard	LW/D	22	5	12	17	40
Bert Corbeau	D	21	10	4	14	22
Leo Reise	D	24	6	6	12	35
Amos Arbour	LW	23	6	3	9	12
Billy Burch	C/LW	10	6	3	9	4
George Carey	RW	5	1	0	1	0
Leth Graham	LW	5	1	0	1	0
Jake Forbes	G	24	0	0	0	0
Harry Mummery	D	7	0	0	0	4

**Goaltending**

Player	MIN	GP	W	L	T	GA	GAA	SO
Jake Forbes	1470	24	6	18	0	110	4.49	0
Team:	1470	24	6	18	0	110	4.49	0

Note: Pos = Position; GP = Games played; G = Goals; A = Assists; Pts = Points; PIM = Penalty minutes
MIN = Minutes played; W = Wins; L = Losses; T = Ties; GA = Goals-against; GAA = Goals-against average; SO = Shutouts;

== See also ==
- 1922–23 NHL season
