= Gerry Denoird =

Canadian ice hockey player

- Born: August 4, 1902 Toronto, Ontario, Canada
- Died: October 8, 1989 (aged 87) Toronto, Ontario, Canada
- Height: 5 ft 10 in (178 cm)
- Weight: 170 lb (77 kg; 12 st 2 lb)
- Position: Centre
- Shot: Right
- Played for: Toronto St. Pats
- Playing career: 1922–1925

Gerald Denoird (August 4, 1902 – October 8, 1989) was a Canadian hockey player who played one season in the National Hockey League for the Toronto St. Pats, playing 17 games.

== Playing career ==
Denoird played junior hockey for Toronto Aura Lee between 1920 and 1922. He turned professional in 1922 and played 17 games during the 1922–23 NHL season with the Toronto St. Pats of the National Hockey League, scoring one assist. He is not recorded playing in the 1923–24 season, but for 1924–25 he joined the senior Toronto Aura Lee team for two games, and also played for the Toronto AA Clarke club that year.

== Career statistics ==
=== Regular season and playoffs ===
			Regular season					Playoffs
Season	Team	League	GP	G	A	Pts	PIM	GP	G	A	Pts	PIM
1920–21	Toronto Aura Lee	OHA Jr	3	1	0	1	0	—	—	—	—	—
1921–22	Toronto Aura Lee	OHA Jr	6	10	0	10	0	—	—	—	—	—
1922–23	Toronto St. Patricks	NHL	17	0	1	1	0	—	—	—	—	—
1924–25	Toronto Aura Lee	OHA Sr	2	1	0	1	0	—	—	—	—	—
1924–25	Toronto AA Clarke	OHA Sr	—	—	—	—	—	—	—	—	—	—
NHL totals			17	0	1	1	0	—	—	—	—	—
