= Bobby Joliat =

Canadian ice hockey player

- Born: April 25, 1898 Ottawa, Ontario, Canada
- Died: August 10, 1953 (aged 55) Rockcliffe Park, Ontario, Canada
- Height: 5 ft 5 in (165 cm)
- Weight: 140 lb (64 kg; 10 st 0 lb)
- Position: Right wing
- Shot: Left
- Played for: Montreal Canadiens
- Playing career: 1916–1930

Rene Robert Joliat (April 25, 1898 – August 10, 1953) was a Canadian ice hockey right winger. He played one game in the National Hockey League for the Montreal Canadiens during the 1924–25 season. The rest of his career, which lasted from 1916 to 1930, was spent in senior leagues. Joliat's brother Aurèle Joliat also played in the NHL, and was inducted in to the Hockey Hall of Fame.

== Playing career ==
Joliat was born in Ottawa, Ontario. He played only one National Hockey League game during the 1924–25 season, on November 29, 1924, against the Toronto St. Pats. Joliat retired in 1930.

== Career statistics ==
=== Regular season and playoffs ===
			Regular season					Playoffs
Season	Team	League	GP	G	A	Pts	PIM	GP	G	A	Pts	PIM
1916–17	Ottawa Grand Trunk	OCHL	7	3	0	3	6	—	—	—	—	—
1917–18	Ottawa Aberdeens	OCHL	3	2	0	2	3	—	—	—	—	—
1918–19	Ottawa New Edinburghs	OCHL	8	4	1	5	9	—	—	—	—	—
1919–20	Ottawa New Edinburghs	OCHL	2	0	0	0	0	—	—	—	—	—
1920–21	Ottawa New Edinburghs	OCHL	7	2	0	2	9	—	—	—	—	—
1920–21	Iroquois Falls Papermakes	NOHA	—	—	—	—	—	—	—	—	—	—
1921–22	Ottawa New Edinburghs	OCHL	4	1	0	1	0	—	—	—	—	—
1922–23	Ottawa New Edinburghs	OCHL	16	1	1	2	0	3	0	0	0	0
1923–24	Hull Volants	OCHL	—	—	—	—	—	—	—	—	—	—
1924–25	Montreal Canadiens	NHL	1	0	0	0	0	—	—	—	—	—
1924–25	Boston Maples	USAHA	2	2	0	2	0	—	—	—	—	—
1929–30	Ottawa Shamrocks	OCHL	15	0	0	0	20	6	0	0	0	4
1929–30	Ottawa Shamrocks	Al-Cup	—	—	—	—	—	2	0	0	0	2
NHL totals			1	0	0	0	0	—	—	—	—	—

== See also ==
- List of players who played only one game in the NHL
