= List of Montreal Maroons head coaches =

A list of head coaches of the Montreal Maroons:

- Cecil Hart 1924–1925
- Eddie Gerard 1925–1929
- Dunc Munro 1929–1930
- Dunc Munro and George "Buck" Boucher 1930–31
- Sprague Cleghorn 1931–1932
- Eddie Gerard 1932–1934
- Tommy Gorman 1934–1937
- King Clancy and Tommy Gorman 1937–38
