= List of Ottawa Senators (original) head coaches =

This is a list of the coaches of the Ottawa Hockey Club, later known as the Ottawa Senators, which existed from 1883. The list does not include coaches of the NHL franchise after it moved from Ottawa, or the Senators hockey team which existed from 1934 until 1954.

== Pre-NHL era ==
In this early era, the captain of the club was the coach. No other individual was hired by the club.

Captains

- Frank Jenkins 1883–1886, 1889–1890
- Thomas D. Green, 1886–1887
- P. D. Ross, 1890–91
- Bert Russel 1891–1893
- Weldy Young, 1893–1895
- Chauncey Kirby, 1895–96
- Fred Chittick, 1896–97
- Harvey Pulford, 1897–98
- Chauncey Kirby, 1898–99
- Hod Stuart, 1899–1900
- Harvey Pulford, 1900–1901
- William Duval, 1902

Coaches

- Alf Smith (1901, 1903–1906) (playing coach from 1904 to 1906)
- Pete Green (1902, 1907–1913)
- Alf Smith (1913–1917)

== NHL era ==
This is a list of head coaches for the original Ottawa Senators club of the National Hockey League. This list does not include the current NHL Ottawa Senators.

1. Eddie Gerard (1916–1918) (playing coach)
2. Harry Hyland (1918) (playing coach)
3. Alf Smith (1918–1919)
4. Pete Green (1919–1925)
5. Alex Currie (1925–1926)
6. Dave Gill (1926–1929)
7. Newsy Lalonde (1929–1930)
8. Newsy Lalonde and Dave Gill (1930–31)
9. Cy Denneny (1932–1933)
10. George Boucher (1933–1934)

== See also ==
- List of NHL head coaches
- List of NHL players
