= Eddie Gerard =

Canadian ice hockey player and coach (1890–1937)

- Hockey Hall of Fame, 1945
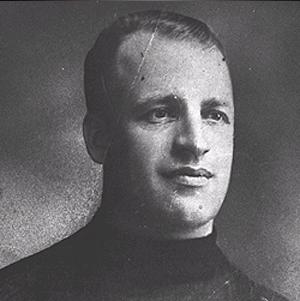
- Gerard in 1923
- Born: February 22, 1890 Ottawa, Ontario, Canada
- Died: August 7, 1937 (aged 47) Ottawa, Ontario, Canada
- Height: 5 ft 9 in (175 cm)
- Weight: 168 lb (76 kg; 12 st 0 lb)
- Position: Left wing/Defence
- Shot: Left
- Played for: Ottawa Senators; Toronto St. Patricks
- Playing career: 1910–1923

Edward George Gerard (February 22, 1890 – August 7, 1937) was a Canadian professional ice hockey player, coach, and manager. Born in Ottawa, Ontario, he played for 10 seasons for his hometown Ottawa Senators. He spent the first three years of his playing career as a left winger before switching to defence, retiring in 1923 due to a throat ailment. Gerard won the Stanley Cup in four consecutive years from 1920 to 1923 (with the Senators three times and as an injury replacement player with the Toronto St. Patricks in 1922), the first player to do so.

After his playing career, he served as a coach and manager, working with the Montreal Maroons from 1925 until 1929 and winning the Stanley Cup in 1926. Gerard also coached the New York Americans for two seasons between 1930 and 1932 before returning to the Maroons for two more seasons. He ended his career coaching the St. Louis Eagles in 1934 before retiring due to the same throat issue that had ended his playing career. He died from complications related to it in 1937.

Renowned as a talented athlete in multiple sports, Gerard first gained prominence in rugby football as a halfback for the Ottawa Rough Riders club from 1909 to 1913; however, he left the sport when he moved to hockey. Outside hockey, he worked initially for the Canadian government as a printer before working in the Geodetic Survey, ultimately becoming chief engineering clerk. Well-renowned during his hockey-playing career, he was regarded as one of the best defenders of his era and gained notice for being a tough player (though not considered violent or dirty). Gerard was one of the original nine players inducted into the Hockey Hall of Fame when it was founded in 1945. He is also an inductee of Canada's Sports Hall of Fame.

== Personal life ==
Eddie Gerard was born on February 22, 1890, in Ottawa, one of seven children (four brothers and two sisters). His father, William, was of Scottish descent. Gerard's middle name, George, was in honour of George Washington, who shared the same February 22 birthday. Gerard lived in Ottawa's New Edinburgh neighbourhood and grew up with future National Hockey League (NHL) players Aurèle Joliat and the four Boucher brothers: Billy, Bobby, Frank, and Georges. (Note: Joliat, Frank, and Georges Boucher were later inducted into the Hockey Hall of Fame.) Gerard was married to Lillian Mackenzie and had two daughters, Alisa and Margaret.

Outside hockey, Gerard worked as a printer and was employed by the Canadian Government Printing Bureau. He changed careers in 1912, moving to the Geodetic Survey and rose in that field to chief engineering clerk at the time of his death.

Throughout his adult life, Gerard dealt with a throat ailment which had caused particular discomfort during his hockey career because the cold aggravated it. It ultimately led to his retirement as a player in 1923 and from coaching in 1934. In early August 1937 the problem, which had remained minor, began to worsen. Gerard was admitted to a hospital, examined by doctors, and diagnosed with throat cancer. He died in Ottawa on August 7, 1937. and was interred in Ottawa's Beechwood Cemetery.

== Sports career ==
=== Outside hockey ===
Skilled in multiple sports, Gerard has been recognized by Canada's Sports Hall of Fame to have been "a first class cricketer, an outstanding paddler and a better than ordinary baseball player" in his youth. At age 15 he helped the Ottawa-New Edinburgh Canoe Club win the junior Dominion paddling championship. In later life he was an avid golfer and fisherman, spending his summers near Pembroke, Ontario, a town close to Ottawa. He played rugby football (a forerunner to Canadian football), joining the Ottawa Rough Riders in 1909 as a halfback, helping them win the Interprovincial Rugby Football Union title that year. He continued playing for the Rough Riders until 1913, leaving the team when he turned professional with the Senators. As Canadian football was strictly amateur at the time, Gerard would have been unable to continue in the sport if he became a professional athlete.

=== Early hockey career ===
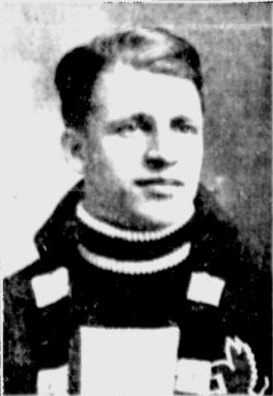
Gerard in 1912, prior to turning professional

Gerard began his playing career for the local Ottawa amateur team Ottawa New Edinburghs (also known as the Ottawa Seconds), from the New Edinburgh neighborhood of Ottawa. In 1908 he also joined the Ottawa Victorias in a challenge series for the Stanley Cup against the Cup holders, the Montreal Wanderers; Gerard replaced an injured player in the second game of the two-game, total-goal series, which Montreal won, retaining the Cup. As early as 1910 Gerard was approached by the Ottawa Senators of the professional National Hockey Association (NHA), but he decided to remain an amateur. The Senators continued to inquire over the following years, though it was not until 1913 that Gerard began to seriously consider turning professional.

In November 1913 he was offered C$1,000 (equivalent to $27,000 in 2025) for the season by the Montreal Canadiens (a high salary for the era), but turned it down. The Senators also made an offer of $1,500 (equivalent to $41,000 in 2025) for two seasons, which would have made Gerard one of the highest paid players in hockey. He also received an offer from the Sydney Hockey Club of the Maritime Hockey League which promised $1,600 (equivalent to $44,000 in 2025) for the season, with an extra $1,000 (equivalent to $27,000 in 2025) to come from advertisements. Having played at the senior amateur level since 1907 for teams in Ottawa, Gerard decided to turn professional in 1913, remaining in his hometown with the Senators. One of the highest regarded athletes in Ottawa, he only agreed to sign with the Senators when they assured him he would be able to keep his government job. Upon signing he was also given a bonus of $400 (equivalent to $11,000 in 2025).

=== Professional hockey career ===
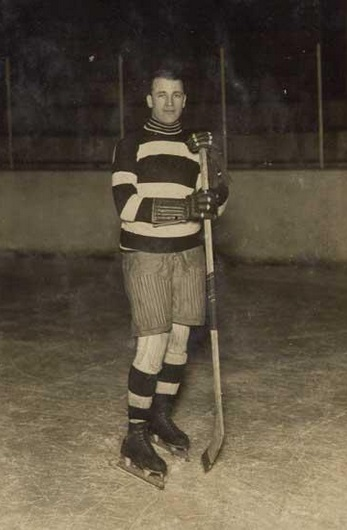
Gerard during the 1913–14 season, his first with the Ottawa Senators

Gerard's first game with the Senators came on January 28, 1914, against the Quebec Bulldogs. He played eleven games with the Senators during the 1913–14 NHA season, and a further two games with the New Edinburghs team. Gerard scored thirteen goals for the Senators and two for the New Edinburghs (assists were not accurately recorded at the time). He appeared in all 20 games of the 1914–15 season. The Senators won the league championship and played the Vancouver Millionaires of the Pacific Coast Hockey Association (PCHA) for the Stanley Cup; Vancouver won the two-game series and the Cup. In 1915, he was named to the NHA All-Stars which toured British Columbia to play PCHA teams. He again played every game for Ottawa during the 1915–16 season, recording 18 points in 24 games. He followed that with 26 points in 19 games in the 1916–17 season, including a career-best five goals in one game against the Wanderers on February 24, 1917.

The NHA was replaced by the National Hockey League (NHL) in 1917–18 season, and in the first year of the new league Gerard had 20 points in 20 games. This placed him eighth overall in the league, his highest career scoring finish in either the NHA or NHL. He served as the player-coach of the Senators from 1916 until 1918, when former Senators player Alf Smith was named coach; as captain Gerard was still given a major role in team affairs but was not given much coaching responsibilities by Smith. Gerard recorded 14 points in 18 games during the 1918–19 season, and a further three goals in five playoff games.

Starting in the 1919–20 season that saw Gerard record 16 points in 22 games, the Senators became one of the most dominant teams in the NHL, winning the Stanley Cup three times in four years between 1920 and 1923, losing only in 1922. The following season Gerard had 15 points in 24 games. During the fifth and final game of the 1921 Stanley Cup Final, he had six penalties, one of which was a match penalty near the end of the game.

Gerard had another strong showing in 1921–22 season, with 18 points in 21 games, as the Senators won the league championship, though losing to the Toronto St. Patricks in the playoffs. After the Senators were eliminated, Gerard was invited to play in game four of the Stanley Cup Final. Harry Cameron, a St. Patricks' defenceman, was injured in the previous game, and Vancouver Millionaires' manager Lester Patrick gave permission for Toronto to use Gerard as a replacement. (Teams could bring in replacements for injured players so long as their opponents consented.) Gerard was instrumental in Toronto winning the game and forcing a deciding fifth in the series. Toronto, with Cameron back in the line-up, won the series, and Gerard was included on the winning roster, his third consecutive Stanley Cup championships.

Back with the Senators for the following season, Gerard recorded 19 points in 23 games. He broke his collarbone during a series against the Vancouver Maroons and missed the first game of the 1923 Stanley Cup Final against the Edmonton Eskimos as a result. Gerard returned for the second, and deciding match, which saw the Senators win the Stanley Cup for the third time in four years. This was Gerard's fourth consecutive Stanley Cup, and he became the first NHL player to win it in four consecutive years. Before the start of the 1923–24 season Gerard was advised by the team doctor that his throat ailment, though benign, would be made worse by continued physical exertion and breathing the cold air in hockey arenas, and this could ultimately diminish his respiratory system. With no other option Gerard opted to retire from playing finishing his career after ten seasons with the Senators.

In recognition of his playing career, Gerard was named one of the nine inaugural inductees of the Hockey Hall of Fame when it was opened in 1945. He would also be inducted into Canada's Sports Hall of Fame in 1975.

== Post-playing career ==
During the 1924–25 season Gerard was hired by the Montreal Maroons to be their joint coach and manager, replacing Cecil Hart midway through the team's inaugural season. He coached the remaining eleven games of the season, winning only one, as the Maroons finished fifth in the six-team league, eight points ahead of their fellow expansion team, the Boston Bruins. Gerard served the dual role of coach and manager until the 1928–29 season. While in this role he won the Stanley Cup for the fifth time in 1926. The Stanley Cup series against the Victoria Cougars of the Western Hockey League was the last time a non-NHL team played for the Stanley Cup. During the second game of the 1928 Stanley Cup Final, Lorne Chabot who was the goaltender for the opposing New York Rangers, was injured. It was custom of the era to allow for any goalies in attendance to fill in (teams dressed only one goalie at the time), but Gerard refused to allow the Rangers to use Alec Connell of the Senators, who was at the game. In response, 44-year-old Lester Patrick, the Rangers' coach and manager, took over and helped the Rangers win the game. The Rangers would go on to win the Stanley Cup.

On July 8, 1929, Gerard, who never had a formal contract, abruptly resigned from the Maroons. Though he never said why he left the team, there were rumours that he was to join the Senators, whose former owner and manager, Tommy Gorman, resigned on the same day from the New York Americans to manage the newly opened Agua Caliente Racetrack in Tijuana, Mexico. In his five seasons as the Maroons' coach Gerard coached 223 games, with a record of 80 wins, 75 losses, and 24 ties.

Offered the chance to replace Gorman as coach of the Americans, Gerard turned it down and spent the year away from hockey. The Americans finished last in the Canadian Division in 1929–30 season. They decided to replace player-coach Lionel Conacher, and again offered the position to Gerard, who accepted. One of his first acts as the new manager of the Americans was to trade Conacher, as he did not want the man he replaced looking over his shoulder. He coached the New York Americans for two seasons, 1930–31 and 1931–32, finishing with a record of 34 wins, 40 losses, and 18 ties in 92 games, before resigning. In late 1932, he returned as manager-coach of the Maroons. In the three years Gerard had been away from the Maroons, newspapers kept publishing rumours that he would return to the team. He coached it for two more seasons, 1932–33 and 1933–34, with 41 wins in 96 games, before being released and replaced by Gorman.

Before the start of the 1934–35 season, the Senators moved from Ottawa to St. Louis, Missouri, and changed their name to the St. Louis Eagles. Gerard was hired as the first coach and manager of the Eagles and replaced his former teammate on the Senators, Georges Boucher. He was given a salary of $4,000 (equivalent to $91,000 in 2025), plus a bonus of $500 (equivalent to $11,000 in 2025) if they made the playoffs, and another $500 if they won the Stanley Cup. The team lost eleven of their first thirteen games to start the season. A combination of the losses and his continuing health problems relating to his throat (doctors ordered him to stay away from hockey rinks to help his throat) led Gerard to resign as coach of the team on December 11, 1934, with Boucher returning to replace him.

== Playing style ==
Throughout his career Gerard was seen as one of the most important players on the Senators, and as a key figure in their three Stanley Cup wins. Although he started his time with the Senators as a forward, where he was expected to contribute goals, he made the transition to defence by his fourth season with the team. As a defender he was not counted on to score as much, but instead prevent the opposition, though he was able to "rush with the power of a forward". Though of average size for the era (he was listed as being 5 ft 9 in (1.75 m) and 168 pounds (76 kg) during his career) Gerard was well known as a physical player: in his obituary he was regarded as someone who "could hit with the force of a battering-ram", and hockey historian Charles L. Coleman described him as being "rugged but not a dirty player [who] took his lumps without a whimper".

During his one game with the St. Patricks in the 1922 Stanley Cup Final, Gerard was noted as "one of Eastern Canada's premier athletes", and his "ability to administer a good heavy body check with lightning speed and clever stick-handling" was also praised. Sprague Cleghorn, who played three seasons as Gerard's defensive partner, said Gerard "was fast, he could stick handle, he was afraid of no man living", and "had brains". Gerard was also noted for his leadership of the Senators, and was considered an ideal captain of the team.

== Career statistics ==
=== Regular season and playoffs ===
			Regular season					Playoffs
Season	Team	League	GP	G	A	Pts	PIM	GP	G	A	Pts	PIM
1907–08	Ottawa Seconds	OCSHL	7	8	—	8	—	—	—	—	—	—
1907–08	Ottawa Victorias	St. Cup	—	—	—	—	—	1	0	0	0	0
1908–09	Ottawa Seconds	OCSHL	5	11	—	11	10	2	1	0	1	5
1909–10	Ottawa Seconds	OCSHL	9	17	—	17	—	3	1	0	1	14
1910–11	Ottawa New Edinburghs	IPAHU	6	9	—	9	18	3	6	0	6	6
1910–11	Ottawa New Edinburghs	OCSHL	2	1	—	1	0	—	—	—	—	—
1911–12	Ottawa New Edinburghs	IPAHU	11	12	—	12	8	4	8	0	8	6
1912–13	Ottawa New Edinburghs	IPAHU	9	16	—	16	16	7	6	0	6	6
1913–14	Ottawa Senators	NHA	11	6	7	13	34	—	—	—	—	—
1913–14	Ottawa New Edinburghs	IPAHU	2	2	—	2	—	—	—	—	—	—
1914–15	Ottawa Senators	NHA	20	9	10	19	39	2	0	0	0	18
1914–15	Ottawa Senators	St. Cup	—	—	—	—	—	3	1	0	1	0
1915–16	Ottawa Senators	NHA	24	13	5	18	57	—	—	—	—	—
1916–17	Ottawa Senators	NHA	19	17	9	26	37	2	1	0	1	3
1917–18	Ottawa Senators	NHL	20	13	7	20	26	—	—	—	—	—
1918–19	Ottawa Senators	NHL	18	4	10	14	17	5	3	0	3	3
1919–20	Ottawa Senators	NHL	22	9	7	16	19	—	—	—	—	—
1919–20	Ottawa Senators	St. Cup	—	—	—	—	—	5	2	1	3	3
1920–21	Ottawa Senators	NHL	24	11	4	15	18	2	1	0	1	6
1920–21	Ottawa Senators	St. Cup	—	—	—	—	—	5	0	0	0	44
1921–22	Ottawa Senators	NHL	21	7	11	18	16	2	0	0	0	8
1921–22	Toronto St. Patricks	St. Cup	—	—	—	—	—	1	0	0	0	0
1922–23	Ottawa Senators	NHL	23	6	8	14	24	2	0	0	0	0
1922–23	Ottawa Senators	St. Cup	—	—	—	—	—	6	1	0	1	4
NHA totals			74	45	31	76	167	7	2	0	2	9
NHL totals			128	50	48	98	120	27	7	1	8	71

- Source: Hockey Hall of Fame

=== Coaching record ===
			Regular season					Playoffs
Season	Team	League	GC	W	L	T	Finish	GC	W	L	T	Result
1917–18	Ottawa Senators	NHL	22	9	13	0	3rd, NHL	—	—	—	—	—
1924–25	Montreal Maroons	NHL	11	1	10	0	5th, NHL	—	—	—	—	—
1925–26	Montreal Maroons	NHL	36	20	11	5	2nd, NHL	4	2	0	2	Won Stanley Cup
1926–27	Montreal Maroons	NHL	44	20	20	4	3rd, Canadian	2	0	1	1	Lost Quarterfinal
1927–28	Montreal Maroons	NHL	44	24	14	6	2nd, Canadian	9	5	3	1	Lost Final
1928–29	Montreal Maroons	NHL	44	15	20	9	5th, Canadian	—	—	—	—	—
1930–31	New York Americans	NHL	44	18	16	10	4th, Canadian	—	—	—	—	—
1931–32	New York Americans	NHL	48	16	24	8	4th, American	—	—	—	—	—
1932–33	Montreal Maroons	NHL	48	22	20	6	2nd, Canadian	2	0	2	0	Lost Quarterfinal
1933–34	Montreal Maroons	NHL	48	19	18	11	3rd, Canadian	4	1	2	1	Lost Semifinal
1934–35	St. Louis Eagles	NHL	13	2	11	0	5th, American	—	—	—	—	—
NHL totals			402	166	177	59	—	21	8	8	5	One Stanley Cup

- Source: Hockey-Reference

== Notes ==
Sporting positions
Preceded by Horace Merrill	Ottawa Senators captain 1916–23	Succeeded by Cy Denneny
Preceded by Alf Smith	Head coach of the Ottawa Senators; 1916–18	Succeeded by Harry Hyland
Preceded by Team Founded	Head coach of the Montreal Maroons; 1924–29	Succeeded by Dunc Munro
Preceded by Lionel Conacher	Head coach of the New York Americans; 1930–32	Succeeded by Joe Simpson
Preceded by Sprague Cleghorn	Head coach of the Montreal Maroons; 1932–34	Succeeded by Tommy Gorman
Preceded by Team Relocated	Head coach of the St. Louis Eagles; 1934–34	Succeeded by Georges Boucher
