= Georges Boucher =

Canadian ice hockey player (1895–1960)

- Hockey Hall of Fame, 1960
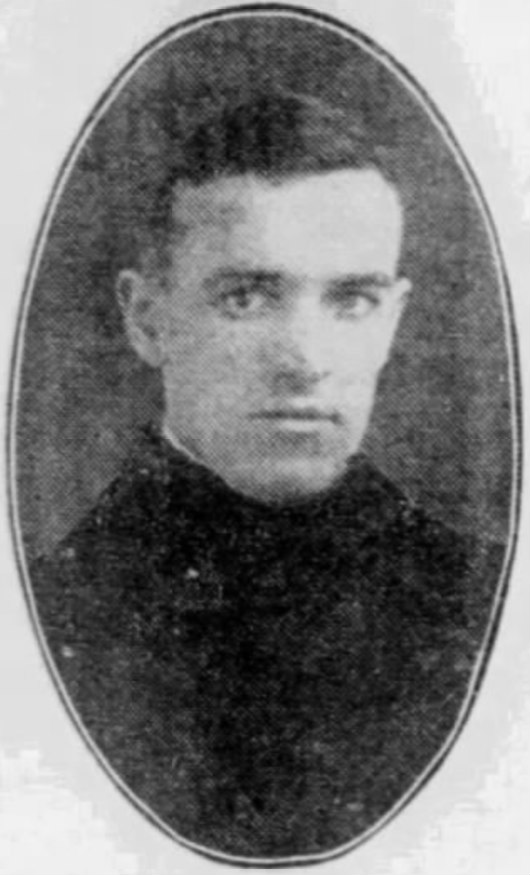
- Born: August 19, 1895 Ottawa, Ontario, Canada
- Died: October 17, 1960 (aged 65)
- Height: 5 ft 9 in (175 cm)
- Weight: 169 lb (77 kg; 12 st 1 lb)
- Position: Defence
- Shot: Left
- Played for: Ottawa Senators; Montreal Maroons; Chicago Black Hawks
- Playing career: 1915–1933

John Georges "Buck" Boucher (August 19, 1895 – October 17, 1960) was a Canadian professional ice hockey defenceman who played for the Ottawa Senators, Montreal Maroons, and Chicago Black Hawks of the National Hockey Association (NHA) and National Hockey League (NHL) between 1915 and 1932. In 1921, he became the first defenceman to record a hat-trick in an NHL playoff game.

== Personal life ==
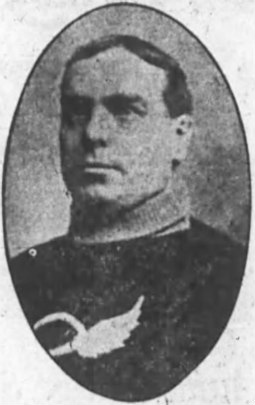
Tom Boucher, while a rugby football player at Ottawa College in the 1890s

Georges was born in Ottawa, Ontario, to Tom Boucher and Annie Carroll. His paternal grandfather, Antoine Boucher, was French while his other grandparents were of Irish descent. His father played rugby football for Ottawa College and for the Ottawa Rough Riders, winning the Canadian championship in 1894, 1896, 1897 and 1901.

His younger brothers Billy, Bob and Frank also became professional ice hockey players. There were two other brothers, Carroll and Joseph, and two sisters, Irene and Lily.

In October 1916, Boucher enlisted with the Canadian military, joining the 207th (Ottawa-Carleton) Battalion, though he was discharged in December that year for unclear reasons. He re-enlisted in May 1917, this time joining the Signal Training Department. He was again discharged, as a medical exam found him to have mitral regurgitation, making Boucher unfit to be a soldier.

His son, Frank Boucher, was the head coach of Canada's 1948 Olympic gold medal-winning ice hockey team – the Ottawa RCAF Flyers.

== Hockey career ==
Boucher started his professional athletic career in football as halfback for the Ottawa Rough Riders of the Canadian Football League. After three years of football, he switched to hockey.

He played as an amateur with the Ottawa Aberdeens, and the New Edinburghs and Royal Canadians of the Ottawa City Hockey League.

He started play with the Senators, then of the NHA, in 1915. At the time, he played as a forward. Boucher would soon switch to play as a defenceman where he would gain fame as an excellent stick handler. He would play with stars such as Eddie Gerard, Horrace Merrill, Sprague Cleghorn, Lionel Hitchman and King Clancy.

Boucher played against his brother Frank in the 1923 Stanley Cup playoffs, which also featured brothers Cy and Corbett Denneny playing against each other. It marked the first time two different sets of brothers faced each other in an NHL or Big Four championship series.

Boucher helped lead the Senators to four Stanley Cup championships between 1920 and 1927. He played in the NHL from 1917 to 1932, scoring 117 goals and 87 recorded assists in 449 games. An extremely tough customer, he also had 838 penalty minutes, including 115 in just 44 games in 1926–27. At his retirement in 1932, he ranked 11th among NHL career points leaders.

He would go on to coach in the NHL in Ottawa, Boston and St. Louis. He coached the Ottawa Senators of the Quebec Hockey League, winning the Allan Cup in 1949.

He suffered from throat cancer for six years and was inducted into the Hockey Hall of Fame in 1960, three weeks before he died.

== Career statistics ==
=== Regular season and playoffs ===
			Regular season					Playoffs
Season	Team	League	GP	G	A	Pts	PIM	GP	G	A	Pts	PIM
1913–14	Ottawa New Edinburghs	IPAHU	5	1	0	1	—	—	—	—	—	—
1914–15	Ottawa New Edinburghs	OCHL	15	12	0	12	—	1	0	0	0	—
1914–15	Ottawa Royal Canadians	OCHL	4	6	0	6	—	2	2	0	2	—
1915–16	Montreal La Casquette	MCHL	1	1	0	1	0	—	—	—	—	—
1915–16	Ottawa Senators	NHA	19	9	1	10	62	—	—	—	—	—
1916–17	Ottawa Senators	NHA	18	10	5	15	27	2	1	0	1	8
1917–18	Ottawa Senators	NHL	21	9	8	17	46	—	—	—	—	—
1918–19	Ottawa Senators	NHL	17	3	2	5	29	5	2	0	2	9
1919–20	Ottawa Senators	NHL	22	9	8	17	55	—	—	—	—	—
1919–20	Ottawa Senators	St-Cup	—	—	—	—	—	5	2	0	2	2
1920–21	Ottawa Senators	NHL	23	11	8	19	53	2	3	0	3	10
1920–21	Ottawa Senators	St-Cup	—	—	—	—	—	5	2	0	2	9
1921–22	Ottawa Senators	NHL	23	13	12	25	12	2	0	0	0	4
1922–23	Ottawa Senators	NHL	24	14	9	23	58	2	0	1	1	2
1922–23	Ottawa Senators	St-Cup	—	—	—	—	—	6	2	1	3	6
1923–24	Ottawa Senators	NHL	21	13	10	23	38	2	0	1	1	4
1924–25	Ottawa Senators	NHL	28	15	5	20	95	—	—	—	—	—
1925–26	Ottawa Senators	NHL	36	8	4	12	64	2	0	0	0	10
1926–27	Ottawa Senators	NHL	40	8	3	11	115	6	0	0	0	43
1927–28	Ottawa Senators	NHL	43	7	5	12	78	2	0	0	0	4
1928–29	Ottawa Senators	NHL	29	3	1	4	60	—	—	—	—	—
1928–29	Montreal Maroons	NHL	12	1	1	2	10	—	—	—	—	—
1929–30	Montreal Maroons	NHL	37	2	6	8	50	3	0	0	0	2
1930–31	Montreal Maroons	NHL	30	0	0	0	25	—	—	—	—	—
1931–32	Chicago Black Hawks	NHL	43	1	5	6	30	2	0	1	1	0
1932–33	Boston Cubs	Can-Am	9	0	0	0	8	—	—	—	—	—
NHA totals			37	19	6	25	89	2	1	0	1	8
NHL totals			449	117	87	204	838	28	5	3	8	88
St-Cup totals			—	—	—	—	—	16	6	1	7	17

== Coaching record ==
=== National Hockey League ===
Team	Year	Regular season						Postseason
Team	Year	G	W	L	T	Pts	Division rank	Result
Montreal Maroons	1930-31	12	6	5	1	(46)	3rd in Canadian	Lost in league quarter-finals (1-8 vs. NYR)
Ottawa Senators	1933-34	48	13	29	6	32	5th in Canadian	Did not qualify
St. Louis Eagles	1934-35	35	9	20	6	(28)	5th in Canadian	Did not qualify
Boston Bruins	1949-50	70	22	32	16	60	5th in NHL	Did not qualify
NHL totals		165	50	86	29	129		0-2 (0.000)

=== Canadian-American Hockey League ===
Team	Year	Regular season						Postseason
Team	Year	G	W	L	T	Pts	Division rank	Result
Boston Cubs	1932-33	48	21	18	9	51	3rd in CAHL	Won in league semi-finals (2-0 vs. PRO); Won Fontaine Cup (3-2 vs. PHI)
Springfield Indians	1935-36	48	21	22	5	47	3rd in CAHL	Lost in league semi-finals (1-2 vs. PRO)
CAHL totals		96	42	40	14	98		6-4 (0.600 - 1 Fontaine Cup)

=== International-American Hockey League ===
Team	Year	Regular season						Postseason
Team	Year	G	W	L	T	Pts	Division rank	Result
Springfield Indians	1936-37	48	22	17	9	53	2nd in East	Won in division semi-finals (2-1 vs. PRO); Lost in division finals (0-2 vs. PHI)
Springfield Indians	1937-38	48	10	30	8	28	4th in East	Did not qualify
IAHL totals		96	32	47	17	81		2-3 (0.400)

=== Quebec Provincial Hockey League ===
Team	Year	Regular season						Postseason
Team	Year	G	W	L	T	Pts	Division rank	Result
Quebec Castors	1939-40	41	13	25	3	29	8th in QPHL	Did not qualify
QPHL totals		41	13	25	3	29		0-0 (0.000)

=== Quebec Senior Hockey League ===
Team	Year	Regular season						Postseason
Team	Year	G	W	L	T	Pts	Division rank	Result
Ottawa Senators	1946-47	40	26	10	4	56	1st in QSHL	Won league semi-finals (3-1 vs. SF); Lost league finals (2-4-1 vs. MTL)
Ottawa Senators	1947-48	48	35	11	2	72	1st in QSHL	Won league semi-finals (4-3 vs. SF); Won league finals (4-1 vs. QUE); Won Quebec Senior Playoffs (2-1 vs. VIC); Won Eastern Canada Allan Cup Playoffs (3-2-1 vs. HAM); Lost Allan Cup finals (1-4 vs.EDM)
QSHL totals		88	61	21	6	128		19-16-2 (0.541)

== NHL Records (1) ==
- Most goals, defenceman, playoff game: 3 (tied with 10 other players) on March 10, 1921

== Bibliography ==
- Globe and Mail. Toronto. October 16, 1960.
- MacLeod, Alan Livingstone (2018), From Rinks to Regiments: Hockey Hall-of-Famers and the Great War, Victoria, British Columbia: Heritage House, ISBN 978-1-77203-268-0

Preceded by Cy Denneny	Head Coach of the Ottawa Senators (Original Era); 1933–1934	Succeeded by Franchise relocates to become St. Louis Eagles
Preceded by Cy Denneny	Ottawa Senators captain (Original Era); 1926–28	Succeeded by King Clancy
Preceded by Dunc Munro	Head coach of the Montreal Maroons; 1930–31	Succeeded by Sprague Cleghorn
Preceded by Dit Clapper	Head coach of the Boston Bruins; 1949–50	Succeeded by Lynn Patrick
