= King Clancy =

Canadian ice hockey player and coach (1903–1986)

- Hockey Hall of Fame, 1958
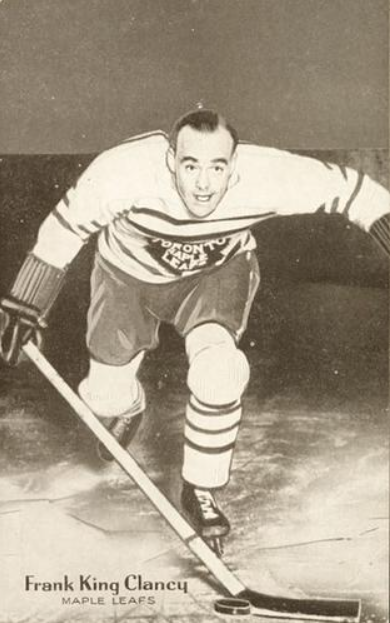
- Clancy with the Toronto Maple Leafs in 1935
- Born: February 25, 1902 Ottawa, Ontario, Canada
- Died: November 8, 1986 (aged 84) Toronto, Ontario, Canada
- Height: 5 ft 7 in (170 cm)
- Weight: 155 lb (70 kg; 11 st 1 lb)
- Position: Defence
- Shot: Left
- Played for: Ottawa Senators; Toronto Maple Leafs
- Playing career: 1921–1937

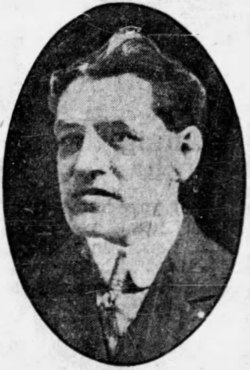
Tom "King" Clancy, father of Frank and the original "King Clancy", was a famous rugby football player around the turn of the twentieth century with Ottawa College and the Ottawa Rough Riders.

Francis Michael "King" Clancy (February 25, 1902 – November 8, 1986) was a Canadian professional ice hockey player, referee, coach and executive. Clancy played 16 seasons in the National Hockey League (NHL) for the Ottawa Senators and Toronto Maple Leafs. He was a member of three Stanley Cup championship teams and won All-Star honours. After he retired in 1937, he remained in hockey, becoming a coach for the Montreal Maroons. Clancy next worked for 11 seasons as a referee in the NHL.

He joined the Toronto Maple Leafs organization and worked as a coach and team executive from that point until his death in 1986.

In 2017 Clancy was named one of the '100 Greatest NHL Players' in history.

== Playing career ==
=== Ottawa Senators ===
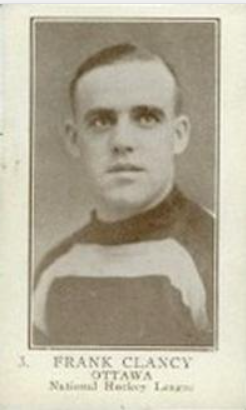
1923-24 card of Ottawa Senators Frank Clancy, prior to being nicknamed "King"

Clancy played for junior teams in the Ottawa area and began his NHL career in his hometown playing for the Senators, where he would establish himself among the league's top players helping the Senators to Stanley Cup wins in 1923 and 1927. Although he was one of the smallest defensemen of his era, he was tough and fast and would not back down. According to hockey broadcaster and historian Brian McFarlane, it was said that King Clancy started a thousand fights and never won one.

During a March 31, 1923, Stanley Cup game against the Edmonton Eskimos, Clancy became the first and only hockey player to play all six positions during one game in the NHL. In the third period, goaltender Clint Benedict was given a two-minute penalty. At the time, goalies served their own penalties. Not wanting to leave the net open, Clancy played goal for the two minutes Benedict was gone.

=== Toronto Maple Leafs ===
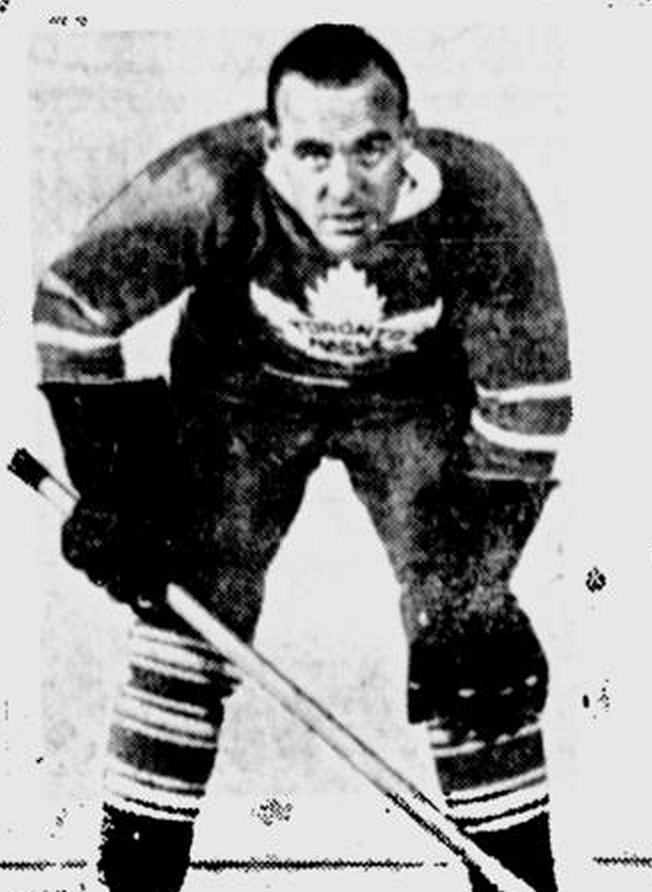
Clancy with the Toronto Maple Leafs in the 1930s

On October 11, 1930, coming off the most productive season of his career, with 17 goals and 40 points in 44 games with the Senators, Clancy was traded to the Maple Leafs, with Toronto manager Conn Smythe giving up $35,000 and two players in exchange for him. In his second season with the Leafs, Clancy helped his team win the Stanley Cup.

After a slow start to the 1936–37 season, Clancy announced his retirement six games into the season. He retired as the top scoring defenceman in NHL history, with 283 career points. In Clancy's last game, he represented the Montreal Maroons at the Howie Morenz Memorial Game in 1937.

== Post-playing career ==
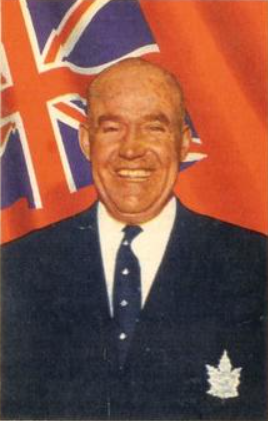
Clancy in 1963 card

The season after his retirement as a player, Clancy briefly coached the Montreal Maroons before beginning an 11-year stint as an NHL referee.

In 1949, the Montreal Canadiens hired Clancy to coach their American Hockey League (AHL) farm team, the Cincinnati Mohawks. He was released after two losing seasons, and rejoined the Maple Leafs organization as coach of the Leafs' AHL affiliate, the Pittsburgh Hornets. The Hornets had two outstanding seasons under Clancy, winning the Calder Cup as league champions in 1951–52, and nearly repeating the following year, before losing the cup final in seven games.

On the strength of that performance, Clancy was made head coach of the Maple Leafs for the 1953–54 season. He held the job for three years, however the team struggled, with each successive season worse than the one before it. He was then appointed assistant general manager by his friend, Conn Smythe, although his responsibilities often involved public relations at least as much as building a hockey team.

Clancy was inducted into the Hockey Hall of Fame in 1958.

He remained assistant general manager-coach through the 1960s, working under Punch Imlach. When Imlach was fired in 1969, Clancy initially said he would leave with him, but was persuaded to stay with the Leafs and was made a vice-president, a decision which did not go over well with Imlach, although the two later reconciled.

After Harold Ballard took control of the Leafs during the 1971–72 season, Clancy and Ballard became inseparable friends. Former Leafs player, coach, and assistant general manager Clarence Hap Day stated Clancy was paid to do nothing by both Smythe and Ballard. During the 1971–72 season, Clancy stepped behind the Leafs' bench as acting coach for 15 games while head coach John McLellan recovered from a peptic ulcer. Clancy remained in the Leafs' front office for the rest of his life.

In 1986, he had an operation to remove his gallbladder, however infection from the gallbladder seeped into his body during the operation at which he went into septic shock. He died on November 10, 1986, at age 84 and was interred in Mount Hope Catholic Cemetery in Toronto, Ontario.

Clancy was associated with professional hockey for 65 years at the time of his death, then the longest-such tenure in NHL history, and a record since surpassed by John Bucyk. He was the last surviving member of the 1922–23 Stanley Cup championship-winning Ottawa Senators.

== Awards and honours ==
- Named to NHL First All-Star Team in 1931 and 1934.
- Named to NHL Second All-Star Team in 1932 and 1933.
- Stanley Cup champion (as a player) – 1923, 1927 (with Ottawa), 1932 (with Toronto)
- Stanley Cup champion (as an assistant manager-coach) 1962, 1963, 1964, 1967 (with Toronto)
- Calder Cup (AHL Champions) (as a coach) – 1952 (Pittsburgh Hornets)
- Inducted into Hockey Hall of Fame – 1958
- Inducted into Canada's Sports Hall of Fame – 1975
- Inducted into Ontario Sports Hall of Fame – 1998
- Number 7 retired by the Toronto Maple Leafs. While playing for the Leafs, Tim Horton wore the number 7, the same number worn by King Clancy from 1931–32 to 1936–37. The team declared both Horton and Clancy honoured players at a ceremony on November 21, 1995, but did not retire the number 7 from team use; despite this, it became an Honoured Number, abiding by Leafs honours policy. In 2016 the Maple Leafs retired all their Honoured Numbers.
- In 1998, he was ranked number 52 on The Hockey News' list of the 100 Greatest Hockey Players.
- In January 2017, Clancy was part of the first group of players to be named one of the '100 Greatest NHL Players' in history.

The King Clancy Memorial Trophy was named in his honour and is awarded annually to the NHL player who demonstrates leadership qualities on and off the ice and who has made exceptional humanitarian contributions in the community.

In popular culture he is referred to in the TV series How I Met Your Mother in the episode "Old King Clancy".

== Career statistics ==
			Regular season					Playoffs
Season	Team	League	GP	G	A	Pts	PIM	GP	G	A	Pts	PIM
1916–17	Ottawa Sandy Hill	OCJHL	4	3	0	3	—	—	—	—	—	—
1916–17	St-Joseph's	High-ON	—	—	—	—	—	2	3	0	3	—
1917–18	Ottawa Munitions	OCJHL	4	2	0	2	—	—	—	—	—	—
1917–18	Ottawa Collegiate	High-ON	—	—	—	—	—	2	3	0	3	—
1918–19	Ottawa St. Brigid's	OCHL	8	0	1	1	3	1	0	0	0	6
1919–20	Ottawa St. Brigid's	OCHL	8	1	0	1	—	—	—	—	—	—
1920–21	Ottawa St. Brigid's	OCHL	11	6	0	6	—	6	5	1	6	12
1921–22	Ottawa Senators	NHL	24	4	6	10	21	2	0	0	0	2
1922–23	Ottawa Senators	NHL	24	3	2	5	20	2	0	0	0	0
1922–23	Ottawa Senators	St-Cup	—	—	—	—	—	6	1	0	1	4
1923–24	Ottawa Senators	NHL	24	8	8	16	26	2	0	0	0	6
1924–25	Ottawa Senators	NHL	29	14	7	21	61	—	—	—	—	—
1925–26	Ottawa Senators	NHL	35	8	4	12	80	2	1	0	1	8
1926–27	Ottawa Senators	NHL	43	9	10	19	78	6	1	1	2	14
1927–28	Ottawa Senators	NHL	39	8	7	15	73	2	0	0	0	6
1928–29	Ottawa Senators	NHL	44	13	2	15	89	—	—	—	—	—
1929–30	Ottawa Senators	NHL	44	17	23	40	83	2	0	1	1	2
1930–31	Toronto Maple Leafs	NHL	44	7	14	21	63	2	1	0	1	0
1931–32	Toronto Maple Leafs	NHL	48	10	9	19	61	7	2	1	3	14
1932–33	Toronto Maple Leafs	NHL	48	13	12	25	79	9	0	3	3	14
1933–34	Toronto Maple Leafs	NHL	46	11	17	28	62	3	0	0	0	8
1934–35	Toronto Maple Leafs	NHL	47	5	16	21	53	7	1	0	1	8
1935–36	Toronto Maple Leafs	NHL	47	5	10	15	61	9	2	2	4	10
1936–37	Toronto Maple Leafs	NHL	6	1	0	1	4	—	—	—	—	—
NHL totals			592	136	147	283	914	55	8	8	16	88

== Coaching record ==
Team	Year	Regular season						Postseason
Team	Year	G	W	L	T	Pts	Finish	Result
MTM	1937–38	18	6	11	1	(30)	4th in Canadian	(fired)
TOR	1953–54	70	32	24	14	78	3rd in NHL	Lost in semi-finals (1-4 vs. DET)
TOR	1954–55	70	24	24	22	70	3rd in NHL	Lost in semi-finals (0-4 vs. DET)
TOR	1955–56	70	24	33	13	61	4th in NHL	Lost in semi-finals (1-4 vs. DET)
MTM Totals		18	6	11	1	13		0-0 (0.00)
TOR Totals		210	80	81	49	209		2-12 (0.143)
Total		228	86	92	50	222		2-12 (0.143)

== Personal ==
Clancy's nickname "King" originates from his father Tom, who was the first 'King Clancy' and played football with the Ottawa Rough Riders. In that era, the football was not snapped as is done today, but was 'heeled' back from the line. Frank's father was very good at this and was named 'King of the Heelers' or 'King' for short. This nickname was eventually transferred to Frank.

Clancy was of Irish descent. His son, Terry Clancy, participated in ice hockey at the 1964 Winter Olympics and later played for the Toronto Maple Leafs.

His great-granddaughter, Laura Stacey is a Canadian ice hockey player for PWHL Montreal, and a member of the Canadian women's national ice hockey team. She won a silver medal with Team Canada at the 2018 Winter Olympics and 2026 Winter Olympics and gold at the 2022 Winter Olympics. She won gold at the 2021 IIHF Women's World Championship, 2022 IIHF Women's World Championship and 2024 IIHF Women's World Championship. She won silver at the IIHF Women's World Championship in 2017, 2023, 2025 and 26 and bronze in 2019. She is married to Marie-Philip Poulin.

== Sources ==
- McFarlane, Brian; Clancy, King (1998) [1968]. Clancy, the King's Story. McGraw Hill. ISBN 1-55022-332-1.
- Conner, Floyd (2002). Hockey's Most Wanted: The Top 10 Book of Wicked Slapshots, Bruising Goons, and Ice Oddities. Brassey's. ISBN 978-1-57488-364-0.

Preceded by Tommy Gorman	Head coach of the Montreal Maroons; 1937–38	Succeeded by Tommy Gorman
Preceded by Joe Primeau	Head coach of the Toronto Maple Leafs; 1953–56	Succeeded by Howie Meeker
Preceded by Georges Boucher	Ottawa Senators captain (original era); 1928–30	Succeeded by Frank Finnigan
