= Cy Denneny =

Canadian ice hockey player (1891–1970)

- Hockey Hall of Fame, 1959
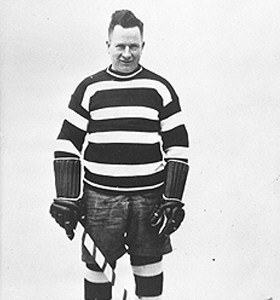
- Born: December 23, 1891 Farran's Point, Ontario, Canada
- Died: September 10, 1970 (aged 78) Ottawa, Ontario, Canada
- Height: 5 ft 7 in (170 cm)
- Weight: 168 lb (76 kg; 12 st 0 lb)
- Position: Left wing
- Shot: Left
- Played for: Toronto Shamrocks; Toronto Blueshirts; Ottawa Senators; Boston Bruins
- Playing career: 1914–1929

Cyril Joseph Denneny (December 23, 1891 – September 10, 1970) was a Canadian ice hockey forward who played for the Ottawa Senators and Boston Bruins in the National Hockey League from 1917 to 1929 and the Toronto Blueshirts of the National Hockey Association from 1914 to 1917. He won the Stanley Cup five times, four times with Ottawa and once with Boston, and was inducted into the Hockey Hall of Fame in 1959.

His younger brother Corbett Denneny also played in the NHL.

== Early life ==
Cy Denneny was born in Farran's Point, Ontario, near Cornwall. He was the son of James Israel Denneny who was a top lacrosse player in the late 19th century and was descended from the Dennenys of County Monaghan, Ireland.

== Playing career ==
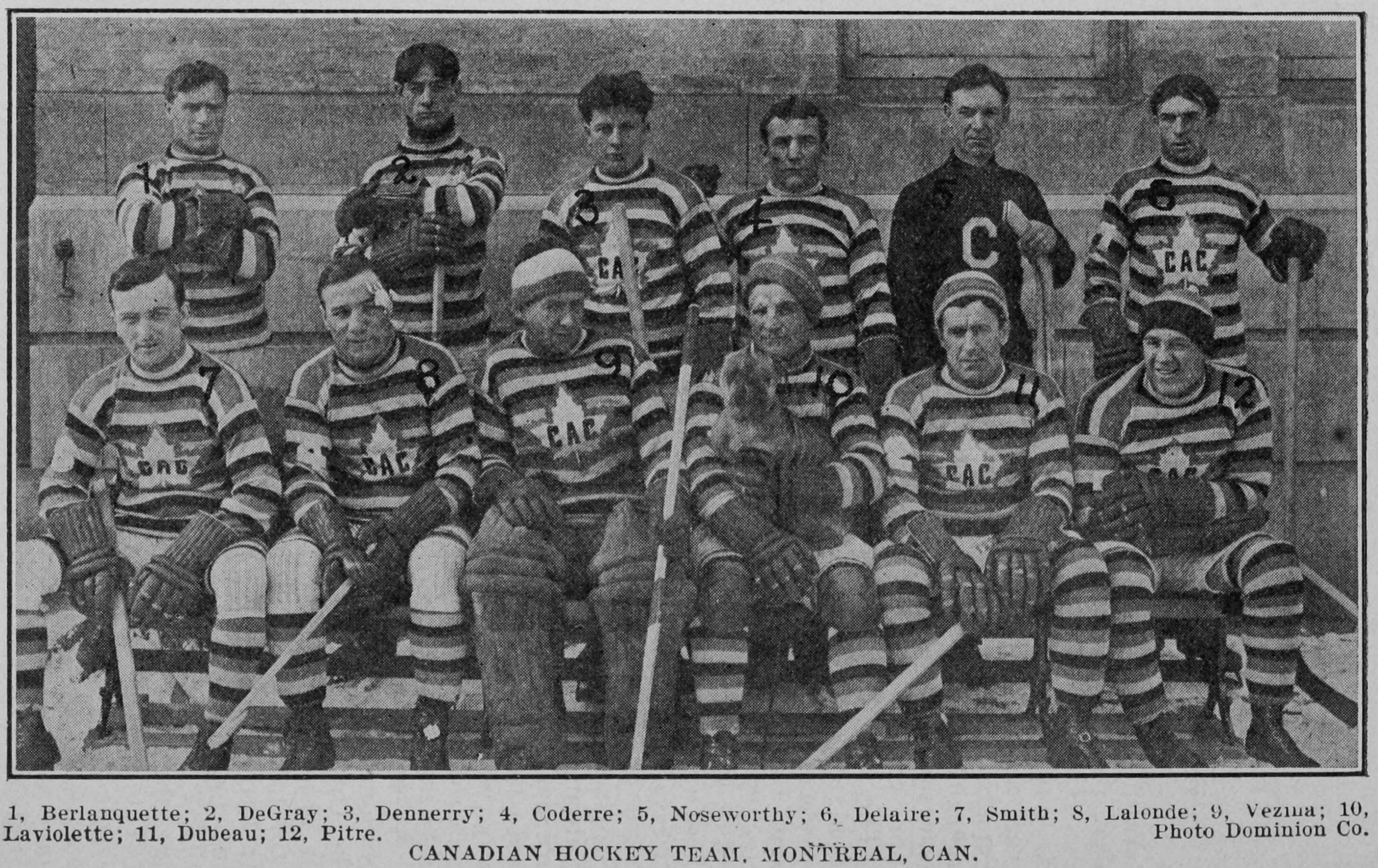
Denneny, standing third from the left, with the 1912–13 Montreal Canadiens (pre-season).

Denneny played senior hockey in Cornwall, starting with the Cornwall Sons of England of the Lower Ottawa Valley hockey league in 1909–10. His professional playing career began with the Toronto Ontarios/Shamrocks of the National Hockey Association (NHA) in 1914 (The name of the team changed during the season). He had tried out for the Montreal Canadiens in 1912 but failed to make the team and he returned to senior hockey. He was traded to the Ottawa Senators in 1916 and he would play with the Senators until 1928.

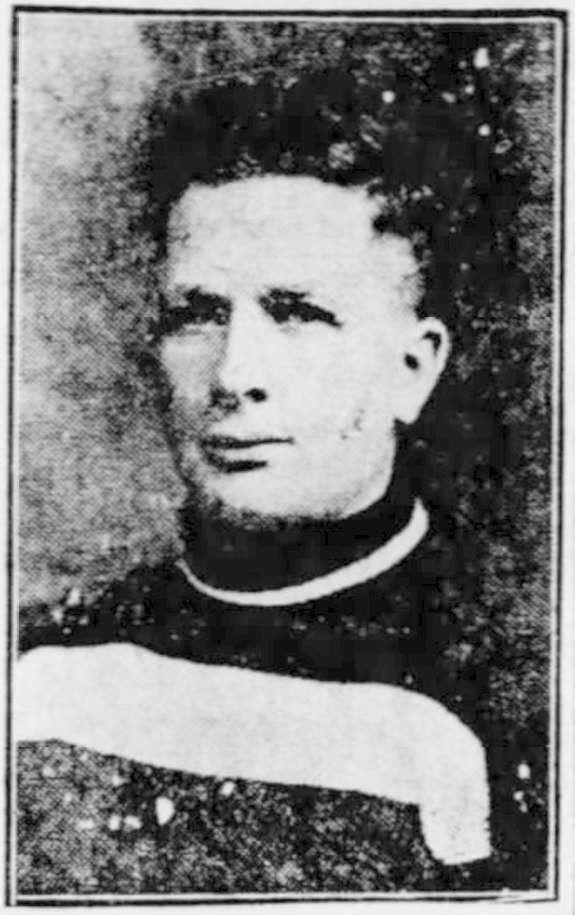
Denneny with the Ottawa Senators.

With the Senators during the 1917–18 season, Denneny set an NHL record by opening the season with four straight multi-goal games, a record that was tied in 2013 by San Jose Sharks' forward Patrick Marleau. During the 1922-23 season, Denneny became the first player in NHL history to score a natural hat trick (three consecutive goals without another player from either team scoring) in back-to-back games, a feat that would not be repeated in the NHL until 1986. Denneny was a member of four Senators Stanley Cup-winning teams; in 1920, 1921, 1923 and 1927. He faced his brother Corbett during the 1923 Stanley Cup playoffs, a series which also featured brothers Frank and Georges Boucher. This marked the first time two different sets of brothers faced each other in an NHL or Big Four championship series.

Denneny was sold to Boston in 1928, where he would be an assistant playing-coach of the Bruins' 1929 Stanley Cup-winner. In 1929, Denneny retired to become an NHL on-ice official. In 1932, he re-joined the Senators as head coach, but the team was in decline due to financial difficulties which forced management to sell top players in order to survive. The team finished last and Denneny was not retained as coach.

Denneny was one of the top scorers in the NHL from 1917 through 1925. While leading the league in scoring during the 1923–24 NHL season, he did so by recording 22 goals and one assist for a total of 23 points, the lowest winning total in NHL history. When he retired, he was the all-time top scorer in NHL history. He was inducted into the Hockey Hall of Fame in 1959. In 1998, he was ranked number 62 on The Hockey News' list of the 100 Greatest Hockey Players. He was the first and fastest player in NHL history to score 200 goals (181 GP). During a six-week span in the 1920–21 NHL season, Cy and his brother Corbett (Toronto St. Patricks), each scored six goals during a game—a feat accomplished by only five other players in the history of the NHL.

== Playing style ==
Despite not being a swift skater, Denneny had one of the most deceptive and accurate shots in the league, which enabled him to achieve his scoring feats so rapidly. He was one of the first known players to use opposing defencemen as screens, and would beat goaltenders with head fakes and subsequently with shots that often would not leave the ice. Denneny was also one of the first players to use a curved blade, which he used to take high-rising shots as well as "sinkers" that would fool goaltenders. He was a very physical player who often acted as an enforcer for his linemates, Jack Darragh and Frank Nighbor.

== Personal life ==
Denneny was married twice. After his first wife Melvina died, Denneny remarried and fathered two daughters with his second wife Isobel. After Denneny retired from hockey, he worked for the Canadian federal government. He retired from the civil service in 1959. He died on September 10, 1970, and is buried in Ottawa's Pinecrest Cemetery.

== Career statistics ==
=== Regular season and playoffs ===
			Regular season					Playoffs
Season	Team	League	GP	G	A	Pts	PIM	GP	G	A	Pts	PIM
1909–10	Cornwall Sons of England	LOVHL	—	—	—	—	—	—	—	—	—	—
1910–11	Cornwall Internationals	LOVHL	8	4	0	4	—	—	—	—	—	—
1911–12	Cornwall Internationals	LOVHL	8	9	0	9	16	—	—	—	—	—
1912–13	Russell Athletics	LOVHL	—	—	—	—	—	—	—	—	—	—
1913–14	Cobalt Mines	COMHL	9	12	0	12	8	—	—	—	—	—
1914–15	Russell HC	LOVHL	3	3	0	3	—	—	—	—	—	—
1914–15	Toronto Shamrocks	NHA	8	6	0	6	43	—	—	—	—	—
1915–16	Toronto Blueshirts	NHA	24	24	4	28	57	—	—	—	—	—
1916–17	Ottawa Senators	NHA	10	3	0	3	17	2	1	0	1	8
1917–18	Ottawa Senators	NHL	21	36	10	46	80	—	—	—	—	—
1918–19	Ottawa Senators	NHL	18	18	4	22	58	5	3	2	5	6
1919–20	Ottawa Senators	NHL	24	16	6	22	31	—	—	—	—	—
1919–20	Ottawa Senators	St-Cup	—	—	—	—	—	5	0	2	2	3
1920–21	Ottawa Senators	NHL	24	34	5	39	10	2	2	0	2	5
1920–21	Ottawa Senators	St-Cup	—	—	—	—	—	5	2	2	4	13
1921–22	Ottawa Senators	NHL	22	28	12	39	20	2	2	0	2	4
1922–23	Ottawa Senators	NHL	24	21	11	34	28	2	2	0	2	2
1922–23	Ottawa Senators	St-Cup	—	—	—	—	—	6	1	2	3	10
1923–24	Ottawa Senators	NHL	22	22	2	24	10	2	2	0	2	2
1924–25	Ottawa Senators	NHL	29	27	15	42	16	—	—	—	—	—
1925–26	Ottawa Senators	NHL	36	24	12	36	18	2	0	0	0	4
1926–27	Ottawa Senators	NHL	42	17	6	23	16	6	5	0	5	0
1927–28	Ottawa Senators	NHL	44	3	0	3	12	2	0	0	0	0
1928–29	Boston Bruins	NHL	23	1	2	3	2	2	0	0	0	0
NHA totals			42	33	4	37	117	2	1	0	1	8
NHL totals			329	247	85	333	301	25	16	2	18	23
St-Cup totals			—	—	—	—	—	16	3	6	9	26

== Coaching record ==
=== National Hockey League ===
Team	Year	Regular season						Postseason
Team	Year	G	W	L	T	Pts	Division rank	Result
Boston Bruins	1928-29	44	26	13	5	57	1st in American	Won league semi-finals (3-0 vs. MTL); Won Stanley Cup (2-0 vs. NYR)
Ottawa Senators	1932-33	48	11	27	10	32	5th in Canadian	Did not qualify
NHL totals		92	37	40	15	89	1 division title	5-0 (1.000 - 1 Stanley Cup)

== See also ==
- List of players with five or more goals in a National Hockey League game

Preceded by Babe Dye	NHL Scoring Champion; 1924	Succeeded by Babe Dye
Preceded by Newsy Lalonde	Head Coach of the Ottawa Senators (Original Era); 1932–1933	Succeeded by George Boucher
Preceded by Eddie Gerard	Ottawa Senators captain (Original Era); 1923–26	Succeeded by Georges Boucher
