= 1922–23 NHL season =

Professional ice hockey league season

- League: National Hockey League
- Sport: Ice hockey
- Duration: December 16, 1922 – March 9, 1923
- Games: 24
- Teams: 4

Regular season
- Season champions: Ottawa Senators
- Top scorer: Babe Dye (St. Patricks)

O'Brien Cup
- Champions: Ottawa Senators
- Runners-up: Montreal Canadiens

NHL seasons
- ← 1921–22 1923–24 →

The 1922–23 NHL season was the sixth season of the National Hockey League (NHL). Four teams played 24 games each. The Ottawa Senators defeated the Montreal Canadiens for the NHL championship, and then defeated Vancouver and Edmonton to win the Stanley Cup.

== Regular season ==
At the start of the season, Newsy Lalonde found himself moving west as the Montreal Canadiens traded him to the Saskatoon Sheiks of the Western Canada Hockey League for a rising young star named Aurel Joliat. Joliat would help the Canadiens win the second playoff spot over the St. Patricks. Joliat scored two goals in his first game with the Canadiens, but Babe Dye had five goals in the Toronto St. Patricks' 7–2 win. Joliat finished with 12 goals and 21 points in 24 games.

The Canadiens sent Bert Corbeau and Edmond Bouchard to Hamilton in exchange for Joe Malone.

On January 31, 1923, the Montreal Canadiens and Hamilton Tigers played the first penalty-free game in NHL history, a 5–4 Montreal victory.

On February 14, 1923, CFCA, the radio station of the Toronto Daily Star, broadcast the third period of the Senators-St. Patricks game in Toronto. This was the first radio broadcast of an NHL game. The broadcaster has not been identified, but it may have been Norman Albert who broadcast the Midland-North Toronto game February 8 from the Toronto Arena.

On February 17, 1923, Cy Denneny of Ottawa scored his 143rd goal, surpassing Joe Malone as the all-time goal-scoring leader as the Ottawa Senators shut out the Montreal Canadiens 2–0.

=== Standings ===
National Hockey League
	GP	W	L	T	Pts	GF	GA
**Ottawa Senators**	24	14	9	1	29	77	54
**Montreal Canadiens**	24	13	9	2	28	73	61
Toronto St. Patricks	24	13	10	1	27	82	88
Hamilton Tigers	24	6	18	0	12	81	110

Note: GP = Games played, W = Wins, L = Losses, T = Ties, Pts = Points, GF = Goals for, GA = Goals against
Teams that qualified for the playoffs are highlighted in bold.

== Playoffs ==
This was the second year in which the Stanley Cup playoffs involved three leagues. The previous year saw all three second place teams win their respective leagues. This year, it was all the first place teams. The NHL total goals playoffs for the O'Brien Cup were won by the Ottawa Senators 3 goals to 2. The Pacific Coast Hockey Association abandoned its seven-man hockey in favour of the six-man rules used in the NHL and the Western Canada Hockey League. This allowed the PCHA and the WCHL to play interleague games. Despite playing interleague games, the two separate leagues kept their own standings. The newly renamed Vancouver Maroons won the PCHA championship and the Edmonton Eskimos won the WCHL championship.

=== NHL Championship ===
In the O'Brien Trophy playoffs, the first-place Ottawa Senators, played off against the second-place Montreal Canadiens in a two-game total-goals series.

March 7	Ottawa Senators	2-0	Montreal Canadiens	Mount Royal Arena	Recap
No scoring		First period	No scoring
Cy Denneny (1) - 11:00		Second period	No scoring
Jack Darragh (1) - 11:00		Third period	No scoring
Clint Benedict		Goalie stats	Georges Vezina

March 9	Montreal Canadiens	2-1	Ottawa Senators	The Arena	Recap
Aurel Joliat (1) - 16:00; Billy Boucher (1) - 19:15		First period	No scoring
No scoring		Second period	No scoring
No scoring		Third period	5:05 - Cy Denneny (2)
Georges Vezina		Goalie stats	Clint Benedict

Ottawa won the series on total goals 3-2

=== Stanley Cup playoffs ===
The Stanley Cup playoffs were played in Vancouver. There, the WCHL champions received the privilege of battling the winner between Ottawa and Vancouver. In the end, Ottawa prevailed over both Western opponents to win their eighth Stanley Cup (third as a member of the NHL). Injuries had thinned the Senators line-up, and after seeing the gritty show put on by the undermanned Senators, Vancouver head coach Frank Patrick called them the greatest team he had ever seen.

March 16	Ottawa Senators	1-0	Vancouver Maroons	Denman Arena	Recap
No scoring		First period	No scoring
No scoring		Second period	No scoring
Punch Broadbent (1) - 15:00		Third period	No scoring
Clint Benedict		Goalie stats	Hugh Lehman

March 19	Ottawa Senators	1-4	Vancouver Maroons	Denman Arena	Recap
No scoring		First period	1:18 - Art Duncan (1); 3:37 - Frank Boucher (1); 14:45 - Frank Boucher (2)
No scoring		Second period	13:51 - Art Duncan (2)
Buck Boucher (1) - 1:58		Third period	No scoring
Clint Benedict		Goalie stats	Hugh Lehman

March 23	Ottawa Senators	3-2	Vancouver Maroons	Denman Arena	Recap
Punch Broadbent (2) - 6:33; Punch Broadbent (3) - 14:35		First period	5:23 - Alf Skinner (1)
No scoring		Second period	16:47 - Mickey MacKay (1)
Frank Nighbor (1) - 2:13		Third period	No scoring
Clint Benedict		Goalie stats	Hugh Lehman

March 26	Ottawa Senators	5-1	Vancouver Maroons	Denman Arena	Recap
Buck Boucher (2) - 7:35; Eddie Gerard (1) - 17:25		First period	No scoring
Punch Broadbent (4) - 10:07		Second period	No scoring
King Clancy (1) - 9:15; Punch Broadbent (5) - 19:56		Third period	16:46 - Smokey Harris (1)
Clint Benedict		Goalie stats	Hugh Lehman

Ottawa won the series 3-1

=== Stanley Cup Finals ===
March 29	Ottawa Senators	2-1	OT	Edmonton Eskimos	Denman Arena	Recap
No scoring		First period		No scoring
No scoring		Second period		10:05 - John Morrison (1)
Lionel Hitchman (1) - 13:04		Third period		No scoring
Cy Denneny (3) - 2:08		First overtime period		No scoring
Clint Benedict		Goalie stats		Hal Winkler

March 31	Ottawa Senators	1-0	Edmonton Eskimos	Denman Arena	Recap
Punch Broadbent (6) - pp - 11:23		First period	No scoring
No scoring		Second period	No scoring
No scoring		Third period	No scoring
Clint Benedict		Goalie stats	Hal Winkler

Ottawa won the series 2-0

=== NHL Playoff scoring leader ===
Note: GP = Games played; G = Goals; A = Assists; Pts = Points

Player	Team	GP	G	A	Pts
Punch Broadbent	Ottawa Senators	8	6	1	7

== Awards ==
O'Brien Cup — Ottawa Senators

== Player statistics ==
=== Scoring leaders ===
Note: GP = Games played; G = Goals; A = Assists; PIM = Penalties in minutes; Pts = Points

Name	Team	GP	G	A	PIM	Pts
Babe Dye	Toronto St. Patricks	22	26	11	19	37
Cy Denneny	Ottawa Senators	24	23	11	28	34
Billy Boucher	Montreal Canadiens	24	24	7	55	31
Jack Adams	Toronto St. Patricks	23	19	9	42	28
Mickey Roach	Hamilton Tigers	24	17	10	8	27
Odie Cleghorn	Montreal Canadiens	24	19	6	18	25
George Boucher	Ottawa Senators	24	14	9	58	23
Reg Noble	Toronto St. Patricks	24	12	11	47	23
Cully Wilson	Hamilton Tigers	23	16	5	46	21
Aurel Joliat	Montreal Canadiens	24	12	9	37	21

Source: NHL

=== Leading goaltenders ===
GP = Games Played, GA = Goals Against, Mins = Minutes played, SO = Shutouts, GAA = Goals Against Average

Name	Team	GP	Mins	W	L	T	GA	SO	GAA
Clint Benedict	Ottawa Senators	24	1486	14	9	1	54	4	2.18
Georges Vezina	Montreal Canadiens	24	1488	13	9	2	61	2	2.46
John Ross Roach	Toronto St. Patricks	24	1469	13	10	1	88	1	3.59
Jake Forbes	Hamilton Tigers	24	1470	6	18	0	110	0	4.49

Source: NHL

== Coaches ==
- Hamilton Tigers: Art Ross
- Montreal Canadiens: Leo Dandurand
- Ottawa Senators: Pete Green
- Toronto St. Patricks: George O'Donoghue

== Debuts ==
The following is a list of players of note who played their first NHL game in 1922–23 (listed with their first team, asterisk(*) marks debut in playoffs):

- Billy Burch, Hamilton Tigers
- Aurel Joliat, Montreal Canadiens
- Lionel Hitchman, Ottawa Senators

== Last games ==
The following is a list of players of note that played their last game in the NHL in 1922–23 (listed with their last team):

- Didier Pitre, Montreal Canadiens
- Eddie Gerard, Ottawa Senators
- Harry Cameron, Toronto St. Patricks

== Free agency ==
Date	Players	Team
January 30, 1923	Billy Burch	Hamilton Tigers
February 23, 1923	Lionel Hitchman	Ottawa Senators

== Transactions ==
May 27, 1922	To Hamilton Tigers Jake Forbes	To Toronto St. Patricks cash
October 1, 1922	To Hamilton Tigers Bert Corbeau	To Montreal Canadiens cash
December 22, 1922	To Montreal Canadiens Joe Malone	To Hamilton Tigers Edmond Bouchard

== See also ==
- List of Stanley Cup champions
- Pacific Coast Hockey Association
- Western Canada Hockey League
- List of pre-NHL seasons
- 1922 in sports
- 1923 in sports
