= Edmond Bouchard =

Canadian ice hockey player

- Bouchard with Hamilton Tigers
- Born: May 24, 1892 Saint-Étienne-des-Grès, Quebec, Canada
- Died: July 18, 1953 (aged 61)
- Height: 5 ft 10 in (178 cm)
- Weight: 185 lb (84 kg; 13 st 3 lb)
- Position: Left wing/Defence
- Shot: Left
- Played for: NHL; Hamilton Tigers; New York Americans; Pittsburgh Pirates; Montreal Canadiens; IHL; Pittsburgh Yellow Jackets; AHA; Buffalo MAjors; St. Louis Flyers; Duluth Hornets; CAHL; New Haven Eagles; CPHL; Niagara Falls Cataracts
- Playing career: 1921–1932

Joseph Adelard Edmond Bouchard (May 24, 1892 in Saint-Étienne-des-Grès, Quebec – July 18, 1953) was a Canadian ice hockey left winger who sometimes doubled as a defenceman. He played eight seasons in the National Hockey League with the Hamilton Tigers, New York Americans, Pittsburgh Pirates, and Montreal Canadiens. He also spent several years playing in various minor leagues throughout his career, which lasted from 1915 to 1932.

Bouchard died in July 1953, at an age of 61.

== Career statistics ==
=== Regular season and playoffs ===
| | | | Regular season | | | | | Playoffs |
| Season | Team | League | GP | G | A | Pts | PIM | GP | G | A | Pts | PIM |
|---|---|---|---|---|---|---|---|---|---|---|---|---|
| 1914–15 | Trois-Rivieres Leafs | QCHL | — | — | — | — | — | — | — | — | — | — |
| 1915–16 | Montreal Nationale | MCHL | 10 | 3 | 0 | 3 | 14 | — | — | — | — | — |
| 1916–17 | Quebec Montagnais | QCHL | 9 | 16 | 5 | 21 | — | — | — | — | — | — |
| 1917–18 | Quebec Montagnais | QCHL | 11 | 27 | 6 | 33 | — | — | — | — | — | — |
| 1918–19 | Quebec Montagnais | QCHL | 6 | 21 | 0 | 21 | — | 4 | 8 | 0 | 8 | 3 |
| 1919–20 | Quebec Crescents | QCHL | 1 | 1 | 0 | 1 | 0 | — | — | — | — | — |
| 1919–20 | Montreal Hochelaga | MCHL | 10 | 12 | 8 | 20 | 18 | 5 | 10 | 3 | 13 | 9 |
| 1920–21 | Quebec Voltigeurs | QCHL | 5 | 6 | 0 | 6 | — | 4 | 4 | 0 | 4 | — |
| 1921–22 | Montreal Canadiens | NHL | 18 | 1 | 5 | 6 | 4 | — | — | — | — | — |
| 1922–23 | Montreal Canadiens | NHL | 2 | 0 | 0 | 0 | 4 | — | — | — | — | — |
| 1922–23 | Hamilton Tigers | NHL | 22 | 5 | 12 | 17 | 40 | — | — | — | — | — |
| 1923–24 | Hamilton Tigers | NHL | 20 | 5 | 0 | 5 | 2 | — | — | — | — | — |
| 1924–25 | Hamilton Tigers | NHL | 24 | 2 | 2 | 4 | 14 | — | — | — | — | — |
| 1925–26 | New York Americans | NHL | 30 | 3 | 1 | 4 | 10 | — | — | — | — | — |
| 1926–27 | New York Americans | NHL | 38 | 2 | 1 | 3 | 12 | — | — | — | — | — |
| 1926–27 | Niagara Falls Cataracts | Can-Pro | 4 | 2 | 1 | 3 | 19 | — | — | — | — | — |
| 1927–28 | New York Americans | NHL | 39 | 1 | 0 | 1 | 27 | — | — | — | — | — |
| 1928–29 | New York Americans | NHL | 6 | 0 | 0 | 0 | 2 | — | — | — | — | — |
| 1928–29 | New Haven Eagles | CAHL | 25 | 5 | 4 | 9 | 45 | — | — | — | — | — |
| 1928–29 | Pittsburgh Pirates | NHL | 12 | 0 | 0 | 0 | 2 | — | — | — | — | — |
| 1929–30 | New Haven Eagles | CAHL | 38 | 18 | 3 | 21 | 58 | — | — | — | — | — |
| 1930–31 | Pittsburgh Yellow Jackets | IHL | 8 | 0 | 0 | 0 | 6 | — | — | — | — | — |
| 1930–31 | Buffalo Majors | AHA | 40 | 23 | 12 | 35 | 44 | — | — | — | — | — |
| 1931–32 | Buffalo Majors | AHA | 24 | 3 | 2 | 5 | 30 | — | — | — | — | — |
| 1931–32 | St. Louis Flyers | AHA | 3 | 1 | 0 | 1 | 2 | — | — | — | — | — |
| 1931–32 | Duluth Hornets | AHA | 18 | 2 | 1 | 3 | 20 | 8 | 1 | 1 | 2 | 10 |
| NHL totals | | | 211 | 19 | 21 | 40 | 117 | — | — | — | — | — |
