= Aurèle Joliat =

Canadian professional ice hockey player (1901–1986)

- Hockey Hall of Fame, 1947
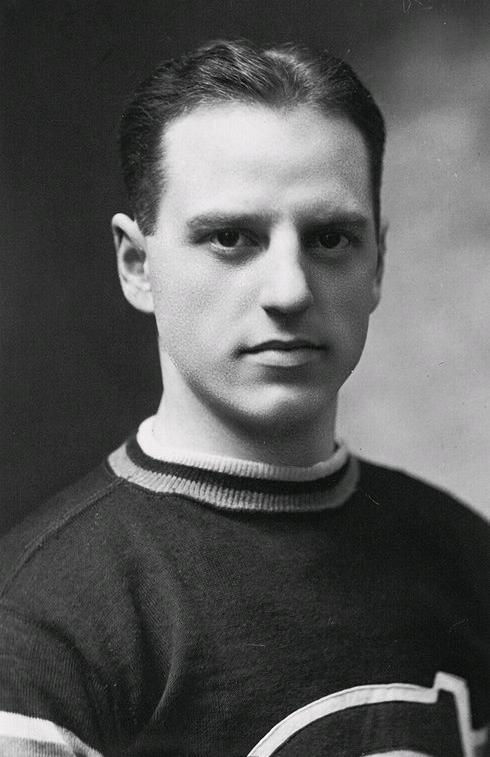
- Born: August 29, 1901 Ottawa, Ontario, Canada
- Died: June 2, 1986 (aged 84) Ottawa, Ontario, Canada
- Height: 5 ft 7 in (170 cm)
- Weight: 136 lb (62 kg; 9 st 10 lb)
- Position: Left wing
- Shot: Left
- Played for: Montreal Canadiens
- Playing career: 1922–1938

Aurèle Émile Joliat (August 29, 1901 – June 2, 1986), nicknamed the "Mighty Atom" and "Little Giant", was a Canadian professional ice hockey left winger who played 16 seasons in the National Hockey League for the Montreal Canadiens.

== Playing career ==
Joliat was born and raised in Ottawa. He began his organized hockey career in 1916, playing for several Canadian amateur teams in Ottawa and Iroquois Falls, Ontario.

Joliat had signed a contract to play for the Saskatoon Crescents of the Western Canada Hockey League for the 1922–23 season, but his contract rights were traded to the Montreal Canadiens when Crescents' manager Frederick E. Betts sought to sign aging superstar Newsy Lalonde as a player-coach.

At first, the deal of an unknown for the greatest player in the game was wildly unpopular with Habs fans, but the "Little Giant" proved an immediate success on the ice. The following season, Joliat helped the Canadiens to the Stanley Cup in 1924 over the WCHL's Calgary Tigers. He helped the Canadiens win two more cups in 1930 and 1931.

Joliat proved noteworthy as a two-way forward, particularly for the ability to counterattack after a breakup. Despite his lack of size—at 5′7″ and 136 lbs, Joliat was one of the smallest players in the game—he was also notable for a refusal to back off from on-ice confrontations.

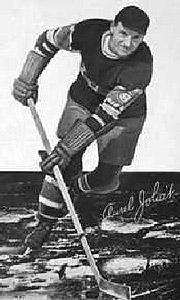
Joliat won the Hart Trophy in 1934.

His breakout season was 1925, when teamed with Howie Morenz and Billy Boucher, Joliat scored 29 goals to lead the NHL, and his 41 points would be a career high. He would remain an impact scorer for the Habs through the 1938 season, and retired the following year, reportedly devastated by Morenz's recent death.

== Retirement ==
Joliat finished his career with 270 goals and 460 points in 655 games. At the time of his retirement, Joliat was the NHL career leader in games played, a mark he held until surpassed by Hooley Smith in 1940.

He was inducted into the Hockey Hall of Fame in 1947.

In a 1985 Montreal Canadiens Old-Timers game, Joliat skated around the Montreal Forum to a huge ovation as a "special treat" for the fans. Despite falling twice over TV cables on the ice, he quickly stood up and finished his skate, the trademark black cap he wore back in his playing days held in his hand.

Joliat continued to skate along Ottawa's Rideau Canal well into his 80s, and died at the age of 84 in 1986 after seeing his beloved Canadiens win their 23rd Stanley Cup earlier that year. He was buried in Notre Dame Cemetery in Ottawa, Ontario.

== Honours and achievements ==
- Won the Stanley Cup in 1924, 1930 and 1931
- Won the Hart Memorial Trophy in 1934
- Named to the inaugural NHL All-Star team as a first team all-star at left wing in 1931
- Named a second team all-star in 1932, 1934 and 1935
- Ranked 65th on The Hockey News list of the 100 greatest NHL players of all time
- Named to the 75th anniversary all-time team by the Canadiens in 1984
- His number 4 jersey was retired along with Jean Béliveau's on October 9, 1971.
- At the time of his retirement, Joliat was third, behind Nels Stewart and teammate Howie Morenz, for goals scored in NHL history.
- He scored the first documented empty net goal in NHL history, with twelve seconds to play on January 21, 1932, against the Toronto Maple Leafs.
- As of 2025, and despite playing in an era of 48 game seasons, Joliat remains in ninth place all-time on the Canadiens' career goal-scoring list and second among left wingers to Steve Shutt.
- His brother Bobby Joliat also played professional hockey.
- He was a linesman when Maurice Richard played his first NHL game in 1942.
- He was the inspiration for Wilson MacDonald's 1935 poem "Monsieur Joliat".

== Career statistics ==
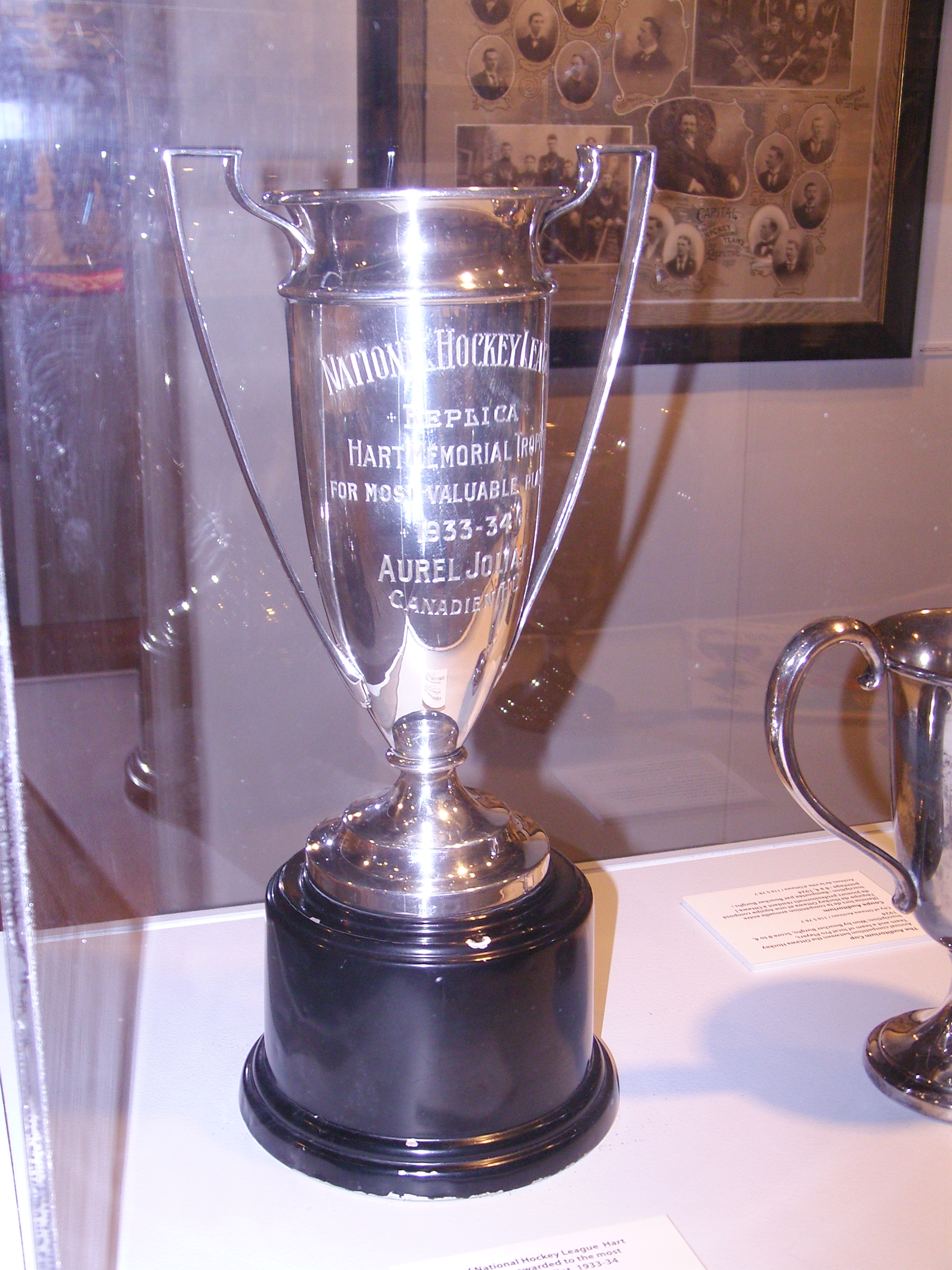
Joliat received this replica Hart Memorial Trophy

			Regular season					Playoffs
Season	Team	League	GP	G	A	Pts	PIM	GP	G	A	Pts	PIM
1916–17	Ottawa New Edinburghs	OCHL	8	2	0	2	—	2	0	0	0	—
1917–18	Ottawa Aberdeens	OCHL	3	2	0	2	3	—	—	—	—	—
1918–19	Ottawa New Edinburghs	OCHL	8	5	3	8	9	—	—	—	—	—
1919–20	Ottawa New Edinburghs	OCHL	7	12	0	12	—	—	—	—	—	—
1920–21	Iroquois Falls Papermakers	NOHA	—	—	—	—	—	—	—	—	—	—
1921–22	Iroquois Falls Flyers	NOHA	—	—	—	—	—	—	—	—	—	—
1922–23	Montreal Canadiens	NHL	24	12	9	21	37	2	1	0	1	11
1923–24	Montreal Canadiens	NHL	24	15	5	20	27	6	4	2	6	6
1923–24	Montreal Canadiens	St-Cup	—	—	—	—	—	4	3	1	4	6
1924–25	Montreal Canadiens	NHL	25	30	11	41	85	5	2	0	2	21
1924–25	Montreal Canadiens	St-Cup	—	—	—	—	—	4	2	0	2	16
1925–26	Montreal Canadiens	NHL	35	17	9	26	52	—	—	—	—	—
1926–27	Montreal Canadiens	NHL	43	14	4	18	79	4	1	0	1	10
1927–28	Montreal Canadiens	NHL	44	28	11	39	105	2	0	0	0	4
1928–29	Montreal Canadiens	NHL	44	12	5	17	59	3	1	1	2	10
1929–30	Montreal Canadiens	NHL	42	19	12	31	40	6	0	2	2	6
1930–31	Montreal Canadiens	NHL	43	13	22	35	73	10	0	4	4	12
1931–32	Montreal Canadiens	NHL	48	15	24	39	46	4	2	0	2	4
1932–33	Montreal Canadiens	NHL	48	18	21	39	53	2	2	1	3	2
1933–34	Montreal Canadiens	NHL	48	22	15	37	27	3	0	1	1	0
1934–35	Montreal Canadiens	NHL	48	17	12	29	18	2	1	0	1	0
1935–36	Montreal Canadiens	NHL	48	15	8	23	16	—	—	—	—	—
1936–37	Montreal Canadiens	NHL	47	17	15	32	30	5	0	3	3	2
1937–38	Montreal Canadiens	NHL	44	6	7	13	24	—	—	—	—	—
NHL totals			655	270	190	460	771	54	14	14	28	88
St-Cup totals			—	—	—	—	—	8	5	1	6	22

Preceded by Eddie Shore	Winner of the Hart Trophy; 1934	Succeeded by Eddie Shore
