= 1917–18 NHL transactions =

This is a list of players recruited into teams in the National Hockey League in its first season, the 1917–18 NHL season. Some had been free agents and others were moved as part of two dispersal drafts.

== Rights retained ==
Note: This is the list of players who were retained by their teams after the NHA disbanded and the NHL was created.

Date	team	Name
November 26, 1917	Montreal Canadiens	Bert Corbeau
November 26, 1917	Montreal Canadiens	Billy Coutu
November 26, 1917	Montreal Canadiens	Louis Berlinquette
November 26, 1917	Montreal Canadiens	Newsy Lalonde
November 26, 1917	Montreal Canadiens	Didier Pitre
November 26, 1917	Montreal Canadiens	Tommy Smith
November 26, 1917	Ottawa Senators	Ed Lowrey
November 26, 1917	Ottawa Senators	Clint Benedict
November 26, 1917	Ottawa Senators	Eddie Girard
November 26, 1917	Ottawa Senators	George Boucher
November 26, 1917	Ottawa Senators	Hamby Shore
November 26, 1917	Montreal Wanderers	Art Ross
November 26, 1917	Montreal Wanderers	George O'Grady
November 26, 1917	Montreal Wanderers	Harry Hyland
November 26, 1917	Montreal Wanderers	Kenneth Thompson
November 26, 1917	Montreal Wanderers	Sprague Cleghorn
November 26, 1917	Montreal Wanderers	Billy Bell
November 26, 1917	Montreal Wanderers	Odie Cleghorn
November 26, 1917	Montreal Wanderers	Phil Stevens

== Free agency ==
Date	Player	Team
November 1917 exact date unknown	Hap Holmes	Montreal Wanderers
November 5, 1917	Alf Skinner	Toronto Arenas
December 3, 1917	Gerry Geran	Montreal Wanderers
December 5, 1917	Corbett Denneny	Toronto Arenas
December 5, 1917	Harry Cameron	Toronto Arenas
December 5, 1917	Harry Meeking	Toronto Arenas
December 5, 1917	Jack Coughlin	Toronto Arenas
December 5, 1917	Sammy Hebert	Toronto Arenas
December 5, 1917	Reg Noble	Toronto Arenas
December 7, 1917	Morley Bruce	Ottawa Senators
December 9, 1917	Ken Randall	Toronto Arenas
December 15, 1917	Art Brooks	Toronto Arenas
December 21, 1917	Raymie Skilton	Montreal Wanderers
December 22, 1917	Frank Nighbor	Ottawa Senators
January 29, 1918	Evariste Payer	Montreal Canadiens
February 9, 1918	Jack Adams	Toronto Arenas
February 9, 1918	Rusty Crawford	Toronto Arenas
February 20, 1918	Horace Merrill	Ottawa Senators

== Dispersal draft ==
Note: This is the list of players who were selected in the dispersal drafts when the Quebec Bulldogs opted not to play the season and the Montreal Wanderers left the league after their home arena burned down.

Date	Player	New team	Previous team
November 26, 1917	Harry Mummery	Toronto Arenas	Quebec Bulldogs
November 26, 1917	Joe Hall	Montreal Canadiens	Quebec Bulldogs
November 26, 1917	Joe Malone	Montreal Canadiens	Quebec Bulldogs
November 26, 1917	Rusty Crawford	Ottawa Senators	Quebec Bulldogs
November 26, 1917	David Ritchie	Montreal Wanderers	Quebec Bulldogs
November 26, 1917	George Carey	Montreal Wanderers	Quebec Bulldogs
November 26, 1917	Jack Marks	Montreal Wanderers	Quebec Bulldogs
November 26, 1917	Jack McDonald	Montreal Wanderers	Quebec Bulldogs
January 4, 1918	Billy Bell	Montreal Canadiens	Montreal Wanderers
January 4, 1918	Jack Marks	Montreal Canadiens	Montreal Wanderers
January 4, 1918	Jack McDonald	Montreal Canadiens	Montreal Wanderers
January 4, 1918	Sprague Cleghorn	Ottawa Senators	Montreal Wanderers
January 4, 1918	Harry Hyland	Ottawa Senators	Montreal Wanderers
January 4, 1918	Dave Ritchie	Ottawa Senators	Montreal Wanderers

== Trades between teams ==
December 12, 1917	To Montreal Wanderers undisclosed return	To Seattle Metropolitans (PCHA) loan of Hap Holmes
January 4, 1918	To Montreal Canadiens undisclosed return	To Toronto Arenas loan of Jack Marks
February 11, 1918	To Ottawa Senators Sammy Hebert	To Toronto Arenas cash

== Sources ==
- http://www.hockeydb.com
- http://www.hockey-reference.com
- Diamond, Dan, ed. (2002), Total Hockey: The Official Encyclopedia of the National Hockey League (Second ed.), New York: Total Sports Publishing, ISBN 1-892129-85-X
- Duff, Bob (2017), The First Season: 1917–18 and the Birth of the NHL, Windsor, Ontario: Biblioasis, ISBN 978-1-771961-84-4
- Toronto Hockey Club
- Montreal Canadiens
