= 1917–18 Montreal Canadiens season =

NHL hockey team season

1917–18 Montreal Canadiens
- League: 1st (1st half), 3rd (2nd half) NHL
- 1917–18 record: 10–4–0 (1st half), 3–5–0 (2nd half)
- Home record: 8–3–0
- Road record: 5–6–0
- Goals for: 115
- Goals against: 84

Team information
- General manager: George Kennedy
- Coach: Newsy Lalonde
- Captain: Newsy Lalonde
- Arena: Montreal Arena/Jubilee Rink

Team leaders
- Goals: Joe Malone (44)
- Assists: Didier Pitre (8)
- Points: Joe Malone (48)
- Penalty minutes: Joe Hall (100)
- Wins: Georges Vezina (12)
- Goals against average: Georges Vezina (3.93)

The 1917–18 Montreal Canadiens season was the team's ninth season and first as a member of the new National Hockey League (NHL). The Canadiens sided with other members of the National Hockey Association (NHA) and voted to suspend the NHA and start the NHL to expel the Toronto Blueshirts ownership. The Canadiens qualified for the playoffs by winning the first half of the season, but lost the playoff to the temporary Toronto franchise, made up of Blueshirts players.

== Team business ==
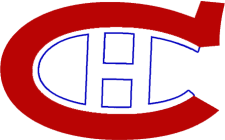
the 1917–18 logo

The club changed its name to "Club de Hockey Canadien Ltd." from "Club Athletic Canadien". The logo on the jersey was changed to reflect this, substituting the "A" within the "C" with an "H".

== Regular season ==
Quebec did not ice a team for the season. Quebec's players were dispersed by draft and Montreal chose Joe Hall, Joe Malone and Walter Mummery. Georges Vezina led the league in goals against average of 4 per game and Joe Malone had 44 goals in 20 games to lead the league in goals.

The team was forced to return to its former arena the Jubilee Rink after the Montreal Arena burned down on January 2, 1918. The rival Montreal Wanderers folded after the fire, leaving only three teams (Montreal, Ottawa and Toronto) to continue the season. The Wanderers' players were dispersed and the Canadiens picked up Billy Bell and Jack McDonald.

On January 28, 1918, when Canadiens visited Toronto, Toronto's Alf Skinner and Montreal's Joe Hall got into a stick-swinging duel. Both players received match penalties, $15 fines and were arrested by the Toronto Police for disorderly conduct, for which they received suspended sentences.

=== Final standings ===
First half
Pos	Team	Pld	W	L	T	GF	GA	GD	Pts	Qualification
1	Montreal Canadiens	14	10	4	0	81	47	+34	20	Qualification for the playoffs
2	Toronto Hockey Club	14	8	6	0	71	75	−4	16	
3	Ottawa Senators	14	5	9	0	67	79	−12	10	
4	Montreal Wanderers	6	1	5	0	17	35	−18	2	Withdrew from the season (Note: The Wanderers defaulted scheduled games against the Canadiens (January 2, 1918) and Toronto (January 5, 1918), while their arena burned down, these appear as losses in the standings, but the games were not played. "The league did not accept the Wanderers' resignation immediately, electing to wait and see whether the team showed up for its scheduled match in Toronto on Saturday January 5. ... The deadline did expire, and the once-powerful team that had been known as the Little Men of Iron was thrown onto the scrap heap of hockey history. The Wanderers' scheduled games of January 2 and 5 were officially recorded in the standings as victories for their respective opponents, the Canadiens and Torontos." — Holzman.)

Source: Hockey-reference
Notes:

Second half
Pos	Team	Pld	W	L	T	GF	GA	GD	Pts	Qualification
1	Toronto Hockey Club	8	5	3	0	37	34	+3	10	Qualification for the playoffs
2	Ottawa Senators	8	4	4	0	35	35	0	8	
3	Montreal Canadiens	8	3	5	0	34	37	−3	6	

Source: Hockey-reference

=== Record vs. opponents ===
1917–18 NHL Records
Team	MTL	MTW	OTT	TOR
M. Canadiens	—	2–0	6–4	5–5
M. Wanderers	0–2	—	0–2	1–1
Ottawa	4–6	2–0	—	3–7
Toronto	5–5	1–1	7–3	—

== Schedule and results ==
1917–18 regular season
First half

Game	Date	Visitor	Score	Home	Score
1	December 19	Ottawa	4	Canadiens	7
2	December 22	Canadiens	11	Wanderers	2
3	December 26	Canadiens	5	Toronto	7
4	December 29	Toronto	2	Canadiens	9
5	January 2	Wanderers	–	Canadiens	–
6	January 5	Ottawa	5	Canadiens	6 (27' OT)
7	January 9	Canadiens	4	Toronto	6
8	January 12	Ottawa	4	Canadiens	9
9	January 19	Toronto	1	Canadiens	5
10	January 21	Canadiens	5	Ottawa	3
11	January 23	Ottawa	4	Canadiens	3
12	January 28	Canadiens	1	Toronto	5
13	January 30	Canadiens	5	Ottawa	2
14	February 2	Toronto	2	Canadiens	11
Notes: Montreal Wanderers forfeit game on January 2.

Second half

Game	Date	Visitor	Score	Home	Score
15	February 6	Canadiens	3	Ottawa	6
16	February 9	Toronto	7	Canadiens	3
17	February 16	Ottawa	4	Canadiens	10
18	February 18	Canadiens	9	Toronto	0
19	February 20	Toronto	4	Canadiens	5
20	February 25	Canadiens	0	Ottawa	8
21	February 27	Ottawa	3	Canadiens	1 (at Quebec)
22	March 2	Canadiens	3	Toronto	5

Legend: Win (2 points) Loss (0 points) Tie (1 point)

== Playoffs ==
The Canadiens played the Torontos in a playoff to decide the league championship. In a two-game, total-goals series, Toronto won the first game 7–3 and Montreal won the second game 4–3. Toronto won the series 10–7 and proceeded to the Stanley Cup playoffs.

Date	Away	Score	Home	Score	Notes
March 11	Montreal Canadiens	3	Toronto	7	
March 13	Toronto	3	Montreal Canadiens	4	

Toronto wins total goals series 10–7 for the O'Brien Cup

== Player statistics ==
=== Skaters ===
Note: GP = Games played, G = Goals, A = Assists, Pts = Points, PIM = Penalties in minutes

		Regular season					Playoffs
Player	#	GP	G	A	Pts	PIM	GP	G	A	Pts	PIM
Joe Malone	7	20	44	4	48	30	2	1	0	1	0
Newsy Lalonde	4	14	23	7	30	51	2	4	2	6	17
Didier Pitre	5	20	17	6	23	29	2	0	1	1	13
Bert Corbeau	2	21	8	8	16	41	2	1	1	2	11
Joe Hall	3	21	8	7	15	100	2	0	1	1	13
Jack McDonald†	11	8	9	1	10	12	2	1	0	1	0
Billy Coutu	9	20	2	2	4	49	2	0	0	0	0
Jack Laviolette	6	18	2	1	3	6	2	0	0	0	0
Louis Berlinguette	8	20	2	1	3	12	2	0	0	0	0
Evariste Payer	12	1	0	0	0	0	-	-	-	-	-
Billy Bell†	10	6	0	0	0	6	-	-	-	-	-

†Denotes player spent time with another team before joining Montreal. Stats reflect time with the Canadiens only.

=== Goaltenders ===
Note: GP = Games played; TOI = Time on ice (minutes); W = Wins; L = Losses; T = Ties; GA = Goals against; SO = Shutouts; GAA = Goals against average

		Regular season								Playoffs
Player	#	GP	TOI	W	L	T	GA	SO	GAA	GP	TOI	W	L	GA	SO	GAA
Georges Vezina	1	21	1282	12	9	0	84	1	3.93	2	120	1	1	10	0	5.00

== Transactions ==
- acquired Joe Hall, Joe Malone and Walter Mummery from Quebec Bulldogs in Dispersal Draft, November 26, 1917
- acquired Billy Bell, Jack Marks and Jack McDonald from Montreal Wanderers in Dispersal Draft, January 4, 1918
- loaned Jack Marks to Toronto Arenas, January 4, 1918
- signed Evariste Payer as a free agent, January 29, 1918

== See also ==
- 1917–18 NHL season
- List of Stanley Cup champions
