= 1917–18 Ottawa Senators season =

National Hockey League team season

1917–18 Ottawa Senators
- 1917–18 record: 5–9–0 (1st half); 4–4–0 (2nd half)
- Home record: 6–4–0
- Road record: 3–9–0
- Goals for: 103
- Goals against: 114

Team information
- General manager: Tommy Gorman
- Coach: Eddie Gerard, Harry Hyland
- Captain: Jack Darragh
- Arena: The Arena

Team leaders
- Goals: Cy Denneny (36)
- Points: Cy Denneny (36)
- Penalty minutes: Cy Denneny (34)
- Wins: Clint Benedict (9)
- Goals against average: Clint Benedict (5.12)

The 1917–18 Ottawa Senators season was the team's first season in the newly formed National Hockey League (NHL) and 33rd season of play overall. The Senators, along with the Montreal and Quebec franchises of the National Hockey Association (NHA), voted to suspend the NHA and form the NHL. Ottawa finished second and third in the first and second halves of the season respectively, and did not qualify for the playoffs.

== Regular season ==
Frank Nighbor was in the Air Corps and did not rejoin the team until later in the season. Horace Merrill quit ice hockey prior to the season, but would eventually play in a few games for the team. Rusty Crawford played for the Senators until Nighbor returned.

The Senators began their membership in the new NHL with a 7–4 loss to the Montreal Canadiens at The Arena in Ottawa on December 19, 1917. The game began with team regulars Jack Darragh and Hamby Shore holding out in a contract dispute. This would be resolved in time for the second period. By then, the Canadiens had a 3–0 lead and the Senators could not make up the difference. Joe Malone of the Canadiens scored five goals in the win.

The team recorded their first NHL win a week later on the December 26 on the road against the Montreal Wanderers. The Senators then recorded their first ever NHL home win three days later against the same Wanderers.

The Wanderers withdrew from the league six games into the season due to a fire burning down their arena, so that left the NHL with three teams, the Senators, Canadiens and the Torontos. Ottawa picked up Dave Ritchie and Harry Hyland in the dispersal of players. Hyland became Ottawa's playing coach. Ottawa finished third in the first half, and second in the second half to miss out on the playoffs.

Cy Denneny led the team in scoring with 36 goals, behind only Joe Malone of the Canadiens in league scoring. Goaltender Clint Benedict won all nine games for the team, and posted a 5.12 GAA.

=== December ===
- December 19 – The Senators opened their inaugural season of the National Hockey League on home ice, hosting the Montreal Canadiens. The Canadiens scored three goals in the first 11 minutes of the game, with Joe Malone scoring two of them. Ottawa finally scored 4:30 into the second period, as Eddie Gerard scored the first goal for the club in the NHL. Montreal stormed back with two goals by Malone, taking a 5–1 lead, however, the Senators Cy Denneny scored twice before the end of the period to cut the Canadiens lead to 5–3. In the third period, Malone scored 6:00 into the period, his fifth goal of the game, followed by a late goal by Didier Pitre, giving Montreal a 7–3 lead. Denneny scored his third goal of the game with two minute remaining, making the final score 7–4 for Montreal.
- December 21 – Ottawa played their first ever road game, as they faced the Toronto Arenas at Arena Gardens in Toronto. Rusty Crawford opened the scoring for Ottawa just one minute into the game, with his first goal of the season, however, the Arenas stormed back and took a 5–1 lead after the first period. Cy Denneny recorded his second consecutive hat trick, however, the Arenas defeated the Senators 11–4.
- December 26 – The Senators travelled to Montreal for their first ever meeting against the Montreal Wanderers at Montreal Arena. The Senators took a 2–0 lead after the first period with goals by Cy Denneny and Hamby Shore. Ottawa took a 5–0 lead midway through the game as Denneny scored his second of the game, while Jack Darragh and Georges Boucher scored their first goals of the season. The Senators won the game 6–3 as Frank Nighbor led the way with a goal and two assists. Clint Benedict earned the first victory in Senators history.
- December 29 – The Senators returned home for a meeting against the Montreal Wanderers. Cy Denneny led the scoring with four goals and an assist, while Georges Boucher scored twice and earned an assist in a 9–2 victory.

Ottawa finished December with a 2–2–0 record, earning four points. The Senators sat in a tie for second place in the NHL with the Toronto Arenas, two points behind the first place Montreal Canadiens.

=== January ===
- January 2 – The Senators hosted the Toronto Arenas at home. Eddie Gerard scored three goals and added an assist, however, the Senators lost to Toronto 6–5, dropping their record to 2–3–0.
- January 5 - Ottawa travelled to Montreal for their first ever road meeting against the Montreal Canadiens at Jubilee Arena. Cy Denneny scored two goals and added an assist as Ottawa took a 5–4 lead into the third period. The Canadiens tied it up at five with a third period goal by Joe Malone, sending the game into overtime. Malone scored in the extra period, as Montreal defeated the Senators 6–5.
- January 12 - After a week with no games scheduled, the Senators returned to Jubilee Arena in Montreal to face the Montreal Canadiens for their second straight game. Four different Senators scored goals, however, the Canadiens, led by Joe Malone with his five goals and two assists, defeated Ottawa 9–4, extending the Senators losing streak to three games.
- January 14 - The Senators faced the Toronto Arenas on home ice. Jack Darragh led the way with three goals and five points, while Cy Denneny scored three goals, as Ottawa defeated the Arenas 9–6 to end their three-game losing streak.
- January 16 - Ottawa travelled to Toronto to face the Arenas in the back end of a home-and-home series. The Arenas defeated the Senators 5–4 despite a third period surge in which the Senators nearly fought back from a 5–2 deficit.
- January 21 - The Sens returned home to face the Montreal Canadiens. Harry Hyland scored a goal and added an assist for Ottawa, however, Joe Hall scored three times for Montreal as the Canadiens defeated the Senators 5–3, dropping the Senators record to 3–7–0.
- January 23 - Ottawa travelled to Montreal for the second game of a home and home series against the Montreal Canadiens. Ottawa took a 3–1 lead into the third period, however, the Canadiens scored twice to tie the game midway through the period. Harry Hyland, with his third goal of the game, restored the lead for Ottawa at 10:25 of the third, as the Senators hung on for a 4–3 victory.
- January 26 - Ottawa was back on home ice to face the Toronto Arenas. Ottawa stormed out to a 6–0 lead late into the third period before the Arenas scored three goals in the final four minutes, as the Senators won the game 6–3. Eddie Gerard scored two goals and added an assist, Jack Darragh scored twice and Cy Denneny had a goal and two assists in the victory.
- January 30 - The Senators two game winning streak is snapped on home ice, as the Montreal Canadiens defeat Ottawa 5–2. Joe Malone scored four goals for the Canadiens.

The Sens finished January with a disappointing 3–6–0 record. The club slipped into last place in the NHL with a 5–8–0 record, earning 10 points. Ottawa was four points behind the Toronto Arenas for second place, and ten points behind the league leading Montreal Canadiens.

=== February/March ===
- February 4 - The Senators first game of February was officially their final game of the first half of the season. The Senators travelled to Toronto and dropped the game by a score of 8–2, finishing the first half of the season with a 5–9–0 record, which placed them in last in the NHL and failing to earn a berth for the NHL finals.
- February 6 - Ottawa opened the second half of the season on home ice against the Montreal Canadiens. Cy Denneny led the way for the Senators, scoring three goals and an assist, while Frank Nighbor scored a goal and an assist in a 6–3 win over Montreal.
- February 11 - The Senators travelled to Toronto for the second time in a week as they faced the Toronto Arenas for the first time in the second half of the season. Despite strong goaltending by Clint Benedict, the Senators dropped a 3–1 decision to the Arenas. Hamby Shore scored the lone goal for Ottawa.
- February 13 - The Senators matched up against the Toronto Arenas on home ice for the second game of a home-and-home series. Ottawa was overmatched in a 6–1 loss to the Arenas as Frank Nighbor scored the only Senators goal. The loss dropped Ottawa to 1–2–0 in the second half of the season.
- February 16 - Ottawa travelled to Montreal for a matchup against the Montreal Canadiens. The Senators struggled once again, as the Canadiens coasted to a 10–4 win over Ottawa. Cy Denneny scored twice in the losing effort.
- February 23 - After a week with no games, the Senators were back on the road, heading to Toronto to face the Toronto Arenas and hoping to snap their three-game losing streak. Toronto, led by three goals and three assists by Reg Noble, easily defeated the Senators 9–3, extending the Senators losing skid to four games and dropping Ottawa to a 1–4–0 record in the second half of the season.
- February 25 - The Senators faced the Montreal Canadiens on home ice. Cy Denneny scored three goals, while Frank Nighbor scored a goal and four assists for a five-point game to lead the Senators scoring. Clint Benedict stopped every shot he faced, recording the first ever shutout in Senators history, as Ottawa defeated Montreal 8–0, snapping their four-game losing streak.
- February 27 - Ottawa travelled to Montreal for a road game against the Montreal Canadiens. The game was played at Quebec Arena in Quebec City. Frank Nighbor scored twice and added an assist, while Clint Benedict surrendered only one goal, as the Senators defeated the Canadiens 3–1.
- March 6 - The Senators closed out their inaugural NHL season with a home matchup against the Toronto Arenas. Frank Nighbor scored four goals, while Cy Denneny scored three goals and two assists, as Ottawa defeated the Arenas 9–3. The win extended the Senators winning streak to three games.

Ottawa finished the second half of the season with a 4–4–0 record, earning eight points. This placed the Senators in second place in the three team NHL, two points behind the first place Toronto Arenas. As Ottawa did not have the best record in the NHL in either the first or second half of the season, the team did not qualify for the NHL championship.

=== Final standings ===
First half
Pos	Team	Pld	W	L	T	GF	GA	GD	Pts	Qualification
1	Montreal Canadiens	14	10	4	0	81	47	+34	20	Qualification for the playoffs
2	Toronto Hockey Club	14	8	6	0	71	75	−4	16	
3	Ottawa Senators	14	5	9	0	67	79	−12	10	
4	Montreal Wanderers	6	1	5	0	17	35	−18	2	Withdrew from the season (Note: The Wanderers defaulted scheduled games against the Canadiens (January 2, 1918) and Toronto (January 5, 1918), while their arena burned down, these appear as losses in the standings, but the games were not played. "The league did not accept the Wanderers' resignation immediately, electing to wait and see whether the team showed up for its scheduled match in Toronto on Saturday January 5. ... The deadline did expire, and the once-powerful team that had been known as the Little Men of Iron was thrown onto the scrap heap of hockey history. The Wanderers' scheduled games of January 2 and 5 were officially recorded in the standings as victories for their respective opponents, the Canadiens and Torontos." — Holzman.)

Source: Hockey-reference
Notes:

Second half
Pos	Team	Pld	W	L	T	GF	GA	GD	Pts	Qualification
1	Toronto Hockey Club	8	5	3	0	37	34	+3	10	Qualification for the playoffs
2	Ottawa Senators	8	4	4	0	35	35	0	8	
3	Montreal Canadiens	8	3	5	0	34	37	−3	6	

Source: Hockey-reference

=== Record vs. opponents ===
1917–18 NHL Records
Team	MTL	MTW	OTT	TOR
M. Canadiens	—	2–0	6–4	5–5
M. Wanderers	0–2	—	0–2	1–1
Ottawa	4–6	2–0	—	3–7
Toronto	5–5	1–1	7–3	—

== Schedule and results ==
1917–18 regular season
First half: 5–9–0 (home: 3–4–0; road: 2–5–0)

Game	Date	Visitor	Score	Home	OT	Decision	Attendance	Arena	Record	Pts	Recap
1	December 19	Canadiens	7–4	Ottawa		Benedict	"Nearly 6,000"	The Arena	0–1–0	0	
2	December 21	Ottawa	4–11	Toronto		Benedict	N/A	Arena Gardens	0–2–0	0	
3	December 26	Ottawa	6–3	Wanderers		Benedict	N/A	Montreal Arena	1–2–0	2	
4	December 29	Wanderers	2–9	Ottawa		Benedict	N/A	The Arena	2–2–0	4	
5	January 2	Toronto	6–5	Ottawa		Benedict	N/A	The Arena	2–3–0	4	
6	January 5	Ottawa	5–6	Canadiens	OT	Benedict	N/A	Jubilee Arena	2–4–0	4	
7	January 12	Ottawa	4–9	Canadiens		Benedict	N/A	Jubilee Arena	2–5–0	4	
8	January 14	Toronto	6–9	Ottawa		Benedict	N/A	The Arena	3–5–0	6	
9	January 16	Ottawa	4–5	Toronto		Benedict	N/A	Arena Gardens	3–6–0	6	
10	January 21	Canadiens	5–3	Ottawa		Benedict	N/A	The Arena	3–7–0	6	
11	January 23	Ottawa	4–3	Canadiens		Benedict	N/A	Jubilee Arena	4–7–0	8	
12	January 26	Toronto	3–6	Ottawa		Benedict	N/A	The Arena	5–7–0	10	
13	January 30	Canadiens	5–2	Ottawa		Benedict	N/A	The Arena	5–8–0	10	
14	February 4	Ottawa	2–8	Toronto		Benedict	N/A	Arena Gardens	5–9–0	10	

Second half: 4–4–0 (home: 3–1–0; road: 1–3–0)

Game	Date	Visitor	Score	Home	OT	Decision	Attendance	Arena	Record	Pts	Recap
15	February 6	Canadiens	3–6	Ottawa		Benedict	N/A	The Arena	1–0–0	2	
16	February 11	Ottawa	1–3	Toronto		Benedict	N/A	Arena Gardens	1–1–0	2	
17	February 13	Toronto	6–1	Ottawa		Benedict	N/A	The Arena	1–2–0	2	
18	February 16	Ottawa	4–10	Canadiens		Benedict	N/A	Jubilee Arena	1–3–0	2	
19	February 23	Ottawa	4–9	Toronto		Benedict	N/A	Arena Gardens	1–4–0	2	
20	February 25	Canadiens	0–8	Ottawa		Benedict	N/A	The Arena	2–4–0	4	
21	February 27	Ottawa	3–1	Canadiens		Benedict	N/A	Quebec Arena	3–4–0	6	
22	March 6	Toronto	3–9	Ottawa		Benedict	N/A	The Arena	4–4–0	8	

Legend: Win (2 points) Loss (0 points) Tie (1 point)

== Player statistics ==
=== Scoring ===
Player	GP	G	A	Pts	PIM
Cy Denneny	22	36	0	36	34
Jack Darragh	18	14	0	14	3
Eddie Gerard	21	13	0	13	12
Frank Nighbor	9	11	0	11	3
Buck Boucher	22	9	0	9	27
Harry Hyland	12	8	0	8	3
Dave Ritchie	13	5	0	5	9
Hamby Shore	18	3	0	3	0
Eddie Lowrey	11	2	0	2	3
Rusty Crawford	11	1	0	1	9
Sammy Hebert	1	0	0	0	0
Horace Merrill	4	0	0	0	0
Morley Bruce	7	0	0	0	0
Clint Benedict	22	0	0	0	0

Source: hockeydb.com

=== Goaltending ===
Player	GP	Min	W	L	T	GA	SO	GAA
Sammy Hebert	1	10	0	0	0	0	0	0.00
Clint Benedict	22	1337	9	13	0	114	1	5.12

Note:

Pos = Position;GP = Games played; G = Goals; A = Assists; Pts = Points; PIM = Penalty minutes; +/- = Plus/minus; PPG = Power-play goals; SHG = Short-handed goals; GWG = Game-winning goals
Pos = Position;GP = Games played; Min, TOI = Minutes played; W = Wins; L = Losses; T,T/OT = Ties; OTL = Overtime losses; GA = Goals-against; GAA = Goals-against average; SO = Shutouts; SA = Shots against; SV = Shots saved;SV% = Save percentage;

== Transactions ==
The Senators were involved in the following transactions during the 1917–18 season.

=== Dispersal Draft ===
November 28, 1917	From Quebec Bulldogs Rusty Crawford
January 4, 1918	From Montreal Wanderers Sprague Cleghorn
January 4, 1918	From Montreal Wanderers Harry Hyland
January 4, 1918	From Montreal Wanderers Dave Ritchie

=== Free agents ===
December 7, 1917	From Ottawa Munitions (OCHL) Morley Bruce

== See also ==
- 1917–18 NHL season
