= 1917–18 Toronto Hockey Club season =

NHL hockey team season (1st in NHL, won Stanley Cup)

1917–18 Toronto Hockey Club
- League champions
- Stanley Cup champions
- League: 2nd (1st half), 1st (2nd half) NHL
- 1917–18 record: 13–9–0
- Home record: 10–1–0
- Road record: 3–8–0
- Goals for: 108
- Goals against: 109

Team information
- General manager: Charles Querrie
- Coach: Dick Carroll
- Captain: Ken Randall
- Arena: Arena Gardens

Team leaders
- Goals: Reg Noble (29)
- Assists: Harry Cameron; Corb Denneny; Reg Noble (10)
- Points: Reg Noble (39)
- Penalty minutes: Ken Randall (116)
- Wins: Hap Holmes (9)
- Goals against average: Hap Holmes (4.73)

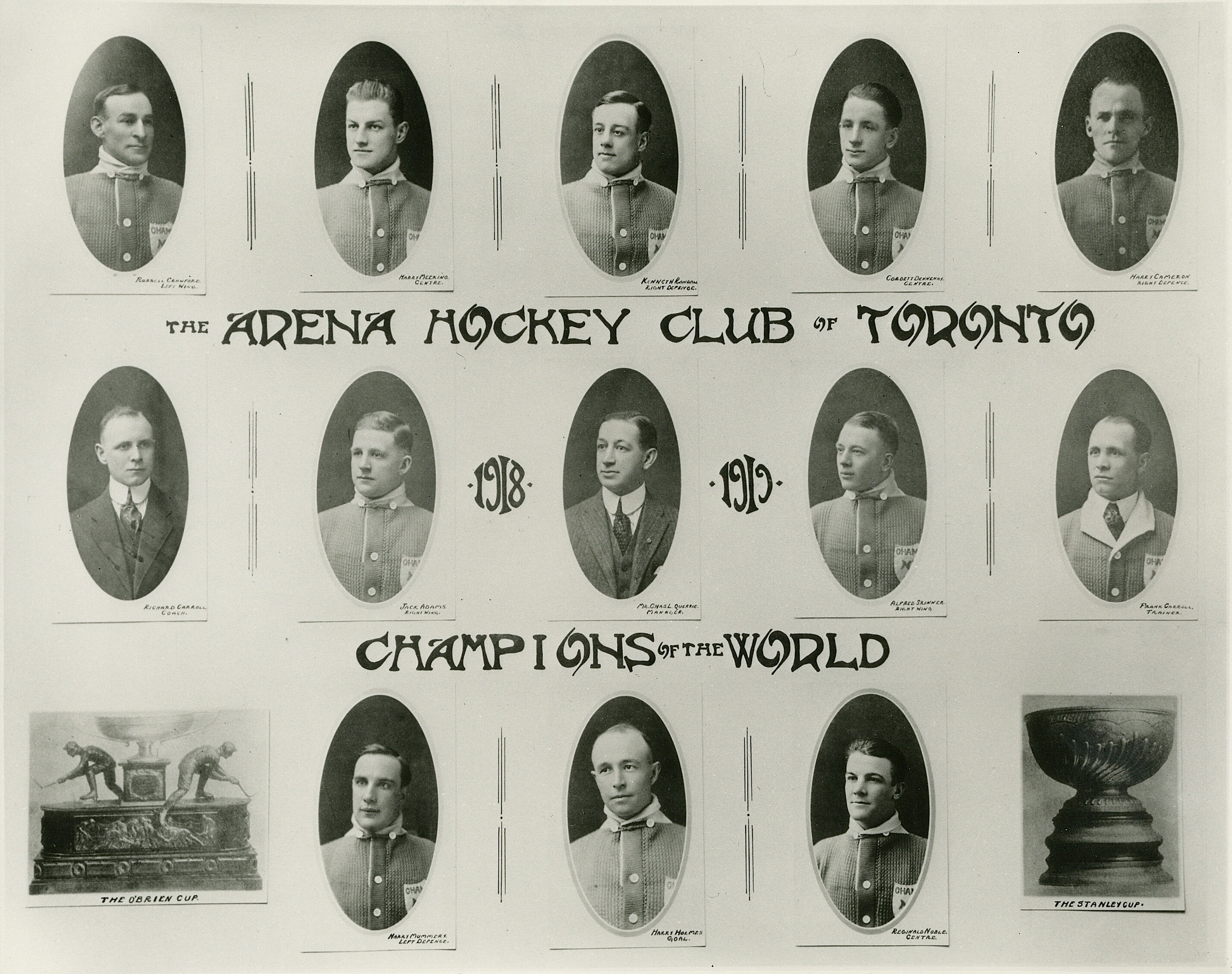
1917–18 season Toronto Arenas. Top row, from left: Rusty Crawford, Harry Meeking, Ken Randall, Corbett Denneny, Harry Cameron. Middle row, from left: Dick Carroll, Jack Adams, Charles Querrie, Alf Skinner, Frank Carroll. Bottom row, from left: Harry Mummery, Harry "Hap" Holmes, Reg Noble.

The 1917–18 Toronto Hockey Club season was the first season of the new Toronto franchise in the newly organized National Hockey League (NHL). The team was intended as a 'temporary' franchise, operating without an official club nickname (the press would dub them the "Blue Shirts" or "Torontos", and in 1948 the NHL would engrave "Toronto Arenas" on the Stanley Cup as the 1917–18 winner) and without a formal organization separate from the Toronto Arena Company that managed the Arena Gardens. Despite this, the team came together to win the first NHL Championship, competing against existing teams that had transferred directly from the National Hockey Association (NHA). Toronto would go on to win the Stanley Cup by defeating the Pacific Coast Hockey Association champion Vancouver Millionaires – the first Stanley Cup for an NHL team and the second Cup for a Toronto team after the Toronto Blueshirts' victory in the 1913–14 season of the NHA. To this day, the Toronto Arenas are the only team in the four major North American sports to win the title in their first season as a franchise.

== Team business ==
A series of disputes in the NHA with Toronto Blueshirts owner Eddie Livingstone led the owners of the other four NHA clubs to create the NHL for the 1917–18 season. They didn't invite Livingstone to join them, effectively leaving him in a one-team league.

The owners turned down a proposal from the management of the Toronto Arena Company to create a new Toronto-based franchise to join the other former NHA teams in a five team NHL. When the Quebec Bulldogs announced they didn't have enough financing to ice a team for the NHL's first season, the NHL granted a temporary franchise to the Toronto Arena Company, maintaining a balanced four-team league and providing representation to the second largest market in Canada. The Arena Company was required to return their temporary franchise to the league if they could not resolve the dispute by the end of the season.

The Toronto Arena Company reached an agreement to lease most of Livingstone's NHA players. The Toronto Arena Company paid players on a cash basis, and many players played without a contract. The players used the same uniform as the previous NHA season – blue with a white 'T'. As a result, while this team did not have an official name, fans and reporters called them "the Torontos" or even "the Blueshirts."

While agreement was reached on leasing the players, financial terms were not settled and this would lead to Livingstone filing a post-season lawsuit against the Toronto Arena Company. This dispute included a disagreement regarding the distribution of revenues from the Toronto Stanley Cup games in 1917, resulting in the Toronto club never engraving their name on the Cup to memorialize their series victory. In 1948, the NHL engraved "1918 Toronto Arenas" on the Cup, using the official nickname of the closely related 1918–19 Toronto franchise.

Following the season, the Arena Company returned its temporary franchise to the NHL. However, in response to the lawsuit, instead of returning the players to Livingstone, or even paying Livingstone, the Arena Company immediately formed a new club, the Toronto Arena Hockey Club, popularly known as the Toronto Arenas. The new club was a standalone corporation that could exist separate from any legal action. The NHL duly admitted the Arenas as a full member in good standing. After only one season, the Arenas filed for bankruptcy, and were sold to new owners who changed the team's name to the Toronto St. Patricks. Midway through the 1926–27 season, the St. Pats adopted their current name, the Toronto Maple Leafs.

While the Maple Leafs claim the 1917-18 Torontos season as the first season in their history, they do not claim the history of the NHA Blueshirts as their own even though the 1917-18 Torontos were a nearly complete (though unpaid) leasing of the 1916–17 Blueshirts. The NHL was formed to eject Livingstone from the NHA, and the Blueshirts franchise formally ceased to exist. For that reason, the Maple Leafs could not claim the NHA Blueshirts' legacy.

== Regular season ==
The Toronto team (the 'Torontos' for the remainder of this article), Montreal Canadiens, Montreal Wanderers, and Ottawa Senators were the original four teams of the league. The Wanderers would not finish the season, as the Montreal Arena burned down on January 2, 1918, and the club would fold after just six games.

The Torontos would finish the first half of the season with an 8–6–0 record, finishing second to the Montreal Canadiens, however, the Torontos put up a league best 5–3–0 record in the second half of the season, earning a spot in the O'Brien Cup finals against the Canadiens. Overall, the Torontos finished 13–9–0, tied with the Montreal Canadiens with the best record in the NHL.

During a game on January 28, 1918, Alf Skinner of the Torontos and Joe Hall of the Montreal Canadiens were involved in a stick swinging duel. Both players received match penalties, $15 fines, and were arrested by the Toronto Police for disorderly conduct, in which they received suspended sentences.

Reg Noble led the Torontos with 30 goals, which placed him third in the league, while Corbett Denneny had 20 goals, and Harry Cameron scored 17 goals. Alf Skinner, Ken Randall, and Harry Meeking would each get into double digits with goals, scoring 13, 12, and 10 respectively. Randall led the club with 55 penalty minutes, while Rusty Crawford earned 51 penalty minutes in only 9 games after being acquired from Ottawa.

In goal, Hap Holmes played the majority of games, earning a club high 10 victories, while backup Arthur Brooks posted a team best 4.00 GAA.

=== Final standings ===
First half
Pos	Team	Pld	W	L	T	GF	GA	GD	Pts	Qualification
1	Montreal Canadiens	14	10	4	0	81	47	+34	20	Qualification for the playoffs
2	Toronto Hockey Club	14	8	6	0	71	75	−4	16	
3	Ottawa Senators	14	5	9	0	67	79	−12	10	
4	Montreal Wanderers	6	1	5	0	17	35	−18	2	Withdrew from the season (Note: The Wanderers defaulted scheduled games against the Canadiens (January 2, 1918) and Toronto (January 5, 1918), while their arena burned down, these appear as losses in the standings, but the games were not played. "The league did not accept the Wanderers' resignation immediately, electing to wait and see whether the team showed up for its scheduled match in Toronto on Saturday January 5. ... The deadline did expire, and the once-powerful team that had been known as the Little Men of Iron was thrown onto the scrap heap of hockey history. The Wanderers' scheduled games of January 2 and 5 were officially recorded in the standings as victories for their respective opponents, the Canadiens and Torontos." — Holzman.)

Source: Hockey-reference
Notes:

Second half
Pos	Team	Pld	W	L	T	GF	GA	GD	Pts	Qualification
1	Toronto Hockey Club	8	5	3	0	37	34	+3	10	Qualification for the playoffs
2	Ottawa Senators	8	4	4	0	35	35	0	8	
3	Montreal Canadiens	8	3	5	0	34	37	−3	6	

Source: Hockey-reference

=== Record vs. opponents ===
1917–18 NHL Records
Team	MTL	MTW	OTT	TOR
M. Canadiens	—	2–0	6–4	5–5
M. Wanderers	0–2	—	0–2	1–1
Ottawa	4–6	2–0	—	3–7
Toronto	5–5	1–1	7–3	—

== Schedule and results ==
1917–18 regular season
First half

Game	Date	Visitor	Score	Home	Record	Pts
1	December 19	Toronto	9–10	Montreal Wanderers	0–1–0	0
2	December 22	Ottawa Senators	4–11	Toronto	1–1–0	2
3	December 26	Montreal Canadiens	5–7	Toronto	2–1–0	4
4	December 29	Toronto	2–9	Montreal Canadiens	2–2–0	4
5	January 2	Toronto	6–5	Ottawa Senators	3–2–0	6
6	January 5	Montreal Wanderers	0–0	Toronto	4–2–0	8
7	January 9	Montreal Canadiens	4–6	Toronto	5–2–0	10
8	January 14	Toronto	6–9	Ottawa Senators	5–3–0	10
9	January 16	Ottawa Senators	4–5	Toronto	6–3–0	12
10	January 19	Toronto	1–5	Montreal Canadiens	6–4–0	12
11	January 26	Toronto	3–6	Ottawa Senators	6–5–0	12
12	January 28	Montreal Canadiens	1–5	Toronto	7–5–0	14
13	February 2	Toronto	2–11	Montreal Canadiens	7–6–0	14
14	February 4	Ottawa Senators	2–8	Toronto	8–6–0	16
Notes: Montreal Wanderers forfeit game on January 5.

Second half

Game	Date	Visitor	Score	Home	Record	Pts
1	February 9	Toronto	7–3	Montreal Canadiens	1–0–0	2
2	February 11	Ottawa Senators	1–3	Toronto	2–0–0	4
3	February 13	Toronto	6–1	Ottawa Senators	3–0–0	6
4	February 18	Montreal Canadiens	9–0	Toronto	3–1–0	6
5	February 20	Toronto	4–5	Montreal Canadiens	3–2–0	6
6	February 23	Ottawa Senators	3–9	Toronto	4–2–0	8
7	March 2	Montreal Canadiens	3–5	Toronto	5–2–0	10
8	March 6	Toronto	3–9	Ottawa Senators	5–3–0	10

Legend: Win (2 points) Loss (0 points) Tie (1 point)

== Playoffs ==
=== Toronto 10, Montreal Canadiens 7 ===
The Torontos qualified for the post-season as they had the best record in the league in the second half of the season, and faced the Montreal Canadiens, who were qualifiers from the first half-season, in a two-game total goal series.

In the first game at Mutual Street Arena, with Hap Holmes in goal for the Torontos, against Georges Vezina of the Canadiens. Toronto took an early 1–0 lead on a goal by Harry Meeking five minutes into the game. The Torontos Ken Randall gave the club a 2-0 heading into the second period. Montreal cut into Toronto's lead, as Newsy Lalonde scored four minutes into the second period, however, a minute later, the Torontos restored their two-goal lead as Harry Meeking scored his second goal of the game. In the third period, Harry Meeking scored his third of the game to give Toronto a 4–1 lead. Bert Corbeau cut the Torontos lead down to 4–2 after he scored two minutes later, however, two quick Toronto goals, one by Jack Adams and another by Harry Cameron gave the team a commanding 6–2 lead. Newsy Lalonde scored his second of the game a minute after Cameron's goal, cutting the lead to 6–3, but the Torontos responded on a goal by Harry Mummery, giving them a 7–3 win.

The series moved to the Jubilee Arena for the second game, with Hap Holmes getting the start for Toronto against Georges Vezina of Montreal. Reg Noble scored the only goal of the first period, giving Toronto a 1–0 lead. In the second period, Montreal tied the game on a goal by Joe Malone, and took a 2–1 lead after a goal by Jack Mcdonald. The Torontos Rusty Crawford tied the game 2-2 late in the period. The Canadiens Newsy Lalonde scored early in the third, giving Montreal a 3–2 lead, however, Rusty Crawford tied it for Toronto midway through the period. Two and a half minutes later, Newsy Lalonde gave Montreal a 4–3 lead, however, that was all the Canadiens could do, as Toronto defeated Montreal 10–7 in the two game total goal series.

=== Stanley Cup Final ===
The Toronto club would face the Vancouver Millionaires of the PCHA to determine the winner of the 1918 Stanley Cup Final in a best of 5 series, with all games being played at Mutual Street Arena. The Torontos took the series opener by a 5–3 score, with the Millionaires earning a 6–4 win in the second game. The teams would again split the next two games, setting up a fifth and final game. The Torontos would hold off the Millionaires with 2–1 victory, as Corbett Denneny scored the winning goal of the series.

1918 Stanley Cup playoffs
NHL championship vs. Montreal Canadiens – Toronto wins 10 goals to 7 goals

Game	Date	Visitor	Score	Home	Series
1	March 11	Montreal Canadiens	3–7	Toronto	1–0
2	March 13	Toronto	3–4	Montreal Canadiens	1–1

Stanley Cup Final vs. Vancouver Millionaires – Toronto wins 3–2

Game	Date	Visitor	Score	Home	Series
1	March 20	Vancouver Millionaires	3–5	Toronto	1–0
2	March 23	Toronto	4–6	Vancouver Millionaires	1–1
3	March 26	Vancouver Millionaires	3–6	Toronto	2–1
4	March 28	Toronto	1–8	Vancouver Millionaires	2–2
5	March 30	Vancouver Millionaires	1–2	Toronto	3–2
Notes: Games 1, 3, and 5 played with NHL rules, games 2 and 4 played with PCHA rules.

Legend: Win Loss

== Player statistics ==
=== Scoring leaders ===
Player	GP	G	A	Pts	PIM
Reg Noble	20	30	10	40	35
Corb Denneny	21	20	9	29	14
Harry Cameron	21	17	10	27	28
Harry Meeking	21	10	9	19	28
Alf Skinner	20	13	5	18	28
Ken Randall	21	12	2	14	96
Harry Mummery	18	3	3	6	41
Rusty Crawford	8	1	2	3	51
Jack Coughlin	5	2	0	2	3
Jack Adams	8	0	0	0	31
Art Brooks	4	0	0	0	0
Sammy Hebert	2	0	0	0	0
Hap Holmes	16	0	0	0	0
Jack Marks	5	0	0	0	0

=== Goaltending ===
Player	GP	TOI	W	L	T	GA	SO	GAA
Arthur Brooks	4	220	2	1	0	23	0	4.00
Hap Holmes	16	965	10	7	0	76	0	4.73
Sammy Hebert	2	80	1	0	0	10	0	7.50

Note:

Pos = Position;GP = Games played; G = Goals; A = Assists; Pts = Points; PIM = Penalty minutes; +/- = Plus/minus; PPG = Power-play goals; SHG = Short-handed goals; GWG = Game-winning goals
Pos = Position;GP = Games played; Min, TOI = Minutes played; W = Wins; L = Losses; T,T/OT = Ties; OTL = Overtime losses; GA = Goals-against; GAA = Goals-against average; SO = Shutouts; SA = Shots against; SV = Shots saved;SV% = Save percentage;

== Awards and records ==
- NHL league champions (O'Brien Cup not awarded)

== Transactions ==
- November 5, 1917: Signed Free Agent Alf Skinner
- November 26, 1917: Claimed Harry Mummery in Dispersal Draft from the Quebec Bulldogs
- December 5, 1917: Signed Free Agents Corbett Denneny, Harry Cameron, Harry Meeking and Jack Coughlin
- December 9, 1917: Signed Free Agent Ken Randall
- December 15, 1917: Signed Free Agent Art Brooks
- January 4, 1918: Montreal Canadiens loaned Jack Marks to Toronto for remainder of season
- February 9, 1918: Signed Free Agents Jack Adams and Rusty Crawford

== See also ==
- 1917–18 NHL season
- List of Stanley Cup champions

== Sources ==
- SHRP Sports
- The Internet Hockey Database
- Rauzulu's Street
- Goalies Archive
- National Hockey League Guide & Record Book 2007
