= 1918–19 NHL transactions =

This is a list of player movements that occurred in the 1918-19 season of the National Hockey League.

== Retirement ==
Players	Last Team	Years in the NHL
Art Brooks (G)	Toronto Hockey Club	1918–19
Harry Hyland (RW)	Ottawa Senators	1918–19
Jack Laviolette (D/W)	Montreal Canadiens	1918–19
George O'Grady (D)	Montreal Wanderers	1918–19
Evariste Payer (C/LW)	Montreal Canadiens	1918–19
Art Ross (D)	Montreal Wanderers	1918–19
Hamby Shore (D/LW)	Ottawa Senators	1918–19
Raymie Skilton (D)	Montreal Wanderers	1918–19
Ken Thompson (C/LW)	Montreal Wanderers	1918–19

== Trades ==
November 28, 1918	To Montreal Canadiens Cash	To Ottawa Senators Tommy Smith
December 14, 1918	To Toronto Arenas Rusty Crawford	To Ottawa Senators future considerations (loan of Harry Cameron)
