= 1917–18 Montreal Wanderers season =

Professional ice hockey team season

The 1917–18 Montreal Wanderers season was the 15th and final season of play of the Montreal Wanderers ice hockey club. Along with the Canadiens, Ottawa and Quebec, the club voted to suspend the National Hockey Association (NHA) and form the National Hockey League (NHL) to freeze out the Toronto NHA franchise owner. On the ice club still had difficulties fielding a competitive club, and when the Montreal Arena burned down, owner Sam Lichtenhein elected to suspend the club. The team is officially credited with having played six games, though they only actually played the first four; the other two were declared forfeit.

== Regular season ==
It was the first season of the new National Hockey League. The Wanderers played on opening night December 19, 1917, against Toronto, winning 10–9. It would be the Wanderers' only win in the NHL. Adding to the Wanderers' woes were the poor attendance at the game of an estimated 700, despite allowing free admission to military personnel and family. The Wanderers then lost the next three games and owner Lichtenhein threatened to withdraw from the league unless he could get some players. Although they could have acquired Joe Malone in the draft they turned to the PCHA and signed goaltender Hap Holmes. They also obtained permission to sign such players as Frank Foyston, Jack Walker and others if they could do so. The Wanderers loaned Holmes to the Seattle Metropolitans of the PCHA but he eventually found his way back to the NHL when Seattle loaned him to Toronto.

A league meeting was planned to deal with the situation, however on January 2, 1918, events overtook the league when the Montreal Arena burned down, leaving the Canadiens and Wanderers homeless. The Canadiens moved into the 3,250-seat Jubilee Rink. The Hamilton arena offered to provide a home for the Wanderers, but owner Lichtenhein disbanded the team on January 4, after the other clubs decided against giving him any players. The remaining three teams would complete the season. Lichtenhein retained his partnership in the NHA/NHL, voting with the Canadiens and Senators in future meetings as needed.

This ended the story of a club that won the Stanley Cup outright four times, and a Cup challenge in another season. It was also the end of a terrific rivalry with Ottawa HC, especially the period between 1904 and 1911, when the two teams dominated Stanley Cup play. Montreal fans would have only one team until the coming of the Montreal Maroons in 1924, formed by former Wanderers owner James Strachan.

=== Record vs. opponents ===
1917–18 NHL Records
Team	MTL	MTW	OTT	TOR
M. Canadiens	—	2–0	6–4	5–5
M. Wanderers	0–2	—	0–2	1–1
Ottawa	4–6	2–0	—	3–7
Toronto	5–5	1–1	7–3	—

=== Game log ===
Month	Day	Visitor	Score	Home	Score
Dec.	19	Toronto	9	Wanderers	10
Dec.	22	Canadiens	11	Wanderers	2
Dec.	26	Ottawa	6	Wanderers	3
Dec.	29	Wanderers	2	Ottawa	9
Jan.	2†	Wanderers	-	Canadiens	-
Jan.	5†	Wanderers	-	Toronto	-

† Montreal Arena burned down and Wanderers withdraw. Two Wanderers games count as wins for Canadiens and Toronto.

== See also ==
- 1917–18 NHL season
