= George O'Grady =

Canadian ice hockey player

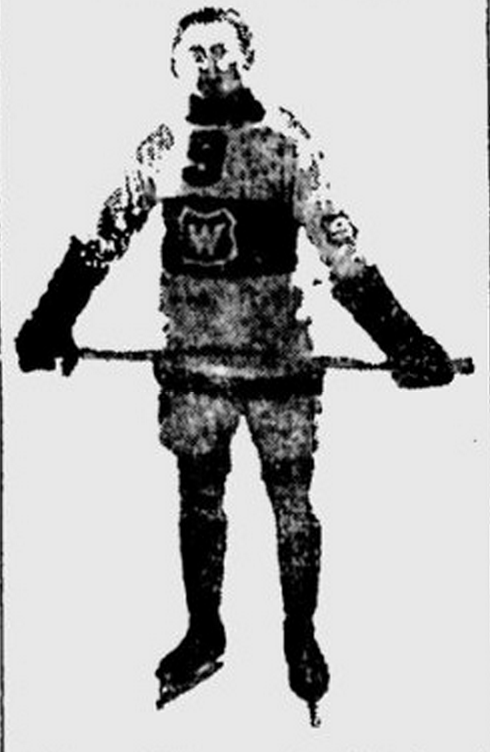
- Born: June 8, 1891 Montreal, Quebec, Canada
- Died: July 25, 1974 (aged 83) Vancouver, British Columbia, Canada
- Height: 5 ft 8 in (173 cm)
- Weight: 175 lb (79 kg; 12 st 7 lb)
- Position: Defence
- Shot: Left
- Played for: Montreal Wanderers
- Playing career: 1913–1917

George Edward O'Grady (June 8, 1891 – July 25, 1974) was a Canadian professional ice hockey player who played for the Montreal Wanderers in both the National Hockey Association and National Hockey League between 1913–1918. He was born in Montreal, Quebec.

== Playing career ==
O'Grady played three seasons as a substitute for the Montreal Wanderers in the now-defunct NHA from 1913–14 to 1915–16. He would follow the team to the upstart National Hockey League for the start of the inaugural season in 1917–18. O'Grady appeared in only four National Hockey League games for the Wanderers, as the team's rink, the Westmount Arena, burnt down in January 1918, forcing the Wanderers to fold midway through the season. During his time with the Wanderers, he wore number nine.

== Career statistics ==
=== Regular season and playoffs ===
			Regular season					Playoffs
Season	Team	League	GP	G	A	Pts	PIM	GP	G	A	Pts	PIM
1911–12	Montreal Garnets	MCHL	6	5	0	5	2	2	0	0	0	0
1912–13	Montreal Garnets	MCHL	11	4	0	4	33	—	—	—	—	—
1913–14	Montreal Wanderers	NHA	12	1	2	3	8	—	—	—	—	—
1914–15	Montreal Wanderers	NHA	2	1	0	1	0	1	0	0	0	0
1915–16	Montreal Wanderers	NHA	2	1	0	0	4	—	—	—	—	—
1916–17	Montreal Stars	MCHL	—	—	—	—	—	—	—	—	—	—
1917–18	Montreal Wanderers	NHL	4	0	0	0	0	—	—	—	—	—
NHA totals			16	2	3	5	12	1	0	0	0	0
NHL totals			4	0	0	0	0	—	—	—	—	—
