= Billy Bell (ice hockey) =

Canadian ice hockey player

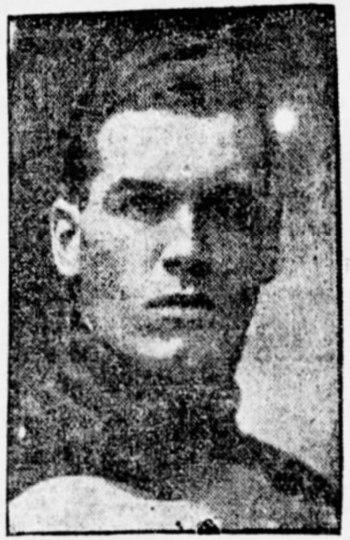
- Born: June 10, 1891 Lachine, Quebec, Canada
- Died: June 3, 1952 (aged 60) Lachine, Quebec, Canada
- Height: 5 ft 10 in (178 cm)
- Weight: 180 lb (82 kg; 12 st 12 lb)
- Position: Centre/Right Wing
- Shot: Right
- Played for: Montreal Wanderers; Montreal Canadiens; Ottawa Senators
- Playing career: 1914–1924

William Edward Bell (June 10, 1891 – June 3, 1952) was a Canadian professional ice hockey player.

== Career ==
Bell played four seasons in the National Hockey Association and six in the National Hockey League for the Montreal Wanderers, Montreal Canadiens, and Ottawa Senators. He won the Stanley Cup in 1924 with the Canadiens.

After his retirement as a player, Bell went on to become an NHL referee. At the end of game four of the 1927 Stanley Cup Final, Bell was tackled by Boston Bruins defenseman Billy Coutu. Coutu also went after Bell's referee colleague Jerry Laflamme and was subsequently banned from the league for life.

== Career statistics ==
=== Regular season and playoffs ===
			Regular season					Playoffs
Season	Team	League	GP	G	A	Pts	PIM	GP	G	A	Pts	PIM
1909–10	Montreal Bell Telephone	MCMHL	1	0	0	0	3	—	—	—	—	—
1910–11	Lachine Eagles	MCMHL	—	—	—	—	—	—	—	—	—	—
1910–11	Montreal Ranger Rustlers	MCJHL	—	—	—	—	—	—	—	—	—	—
1911–12	Montreal Baillargeon	MCHL	4	3	0	3	6	—	—	—	—	—
1912–13	Montreal Stars	MCHL	7	4	0	4	16	—	—	—	—	—
1912–13	Montreal Dominion Bridge	MCMHL	8	4	0	4	—	2	0	0	0	14
1913–14	Montreal Wanderers	NHA	2	1	0	1	0	—	—	—	—	—
1913–14	Montreal AAA	MCHL	3	0	0	0	13	—	—	—	—	—
1914–15	Ottawa Senators	NHA	11	1	0	1	17	—	—	—	—	—
1915–16	Montreal Wanderers	NHA	22	8	2	10	78	—	—	—	—	—
1916–17	Montreal Wanderers	NHA	14	11	0	11	44	—	—	—	—	—
1917–18	Montreal Wanderers	NHL	2	1	0	1	0	—	—	—	—	—
1917–18	Montreal Canadiens	NHL	6	0	0	0	6	—	—	—	—	—
1918–19	Montreal Canadiens	NHL	1	0	0	0	0	—	—	—	—	—
1920–21	Montreal Canadiens	NHL	4	0	0	0	2	—	—	—	—	—
1921–22	Montreal Canadiens	NHL	6	1	0	1	0	—	—	—	—	—
1921–22	Ottawa Senators	NHL	17	1	2	3	4	1	0	0	0	0
1922–23	Montreal Canadiens	NHL	19	0	0	0	2	2	0	0	0	0
1923–24	Montreal Canadiens	NHL	11	0	0	0	0	2	0	0	0	0
1923–24	Montreal Canadiens	St-Cup	—	—	—	—	—	3	0	0	0	0
NHA totals			49	21	2	23	139	—	—	—	—	—
NHL totals			66	3	2	5	14	5	0	0	0	0
