= Walter Mummery =

Canadian ice hockey player (1893–1974)

- Born: September 10, 1893; Chicago, Illinois, USA
- Died: March 30, 1974 (aged 80); Chicago, Illinois, USA
- Relatives: Harry Mummery (brother)
Ice hockey career
- Played for: Brandon Wheat City (1913); Quebec Bulldogs (1914-1917); Montreal Canadiens (1917) →Montreal Wanderers (1917); Edmonton (1919-1920)

Walter Mummery (September 10, 1893 – March 30, 1974) was a professional ice hockey player. He played for the Quebec Bulldogs from 1914 until 1917. His brother Harry also played professional hockey.

== Playing career ==
Born in Chicago, Illinois, United States, the Mummery family moved to Brandon, Manitoba. In 1913, Walter joined Brandon Wheat City of the Manitoba Hockey League. The next season, 1914–15, Walter joined the Quebec Bulldogs of the National Hockey Association (NHA), where he played until the end of the 1916–17 NHA season. The following year, the Quebec club did not operate in the new National Hockey League (NHL) and Mummery was assigned to the Montreal Canadiens. Mummery was loaned to the Montreal Wanderers in December 1917, but did not play a game for the Wanderers either. Before Mummery played a game, the Wanderers arena burned down.

Mummery did not play pro hockey until 1919–20, when he joined Edmonton of the Big-4 League for one season. By then, Quebec was operating in the NHL and his rights were assigned to Quebec but he did not return. He died in Chicago in 1974.
