= Ossie Lang =

Canadian ice hockey player

- Born: December 9, 1893; Toronto, Ontario, Canada
- Died: September 20, 1981 (aged 87); Hamilton, Ontario, Canada
- Height: 5 ft 9 in (175 cm)
- Weight: 145 lb (66 kg; 10 st 5 lb)
- Position: Goaltender
- Played for: Ottawa Senators
- Playing career: 1915–1917

Oswald Wyndham Lang (December 9, 1893 – September 20, 1981) was a Canadian professional ice hockey player. He played with the Ottawa Senators of the National Hockey Association during the 1916–17 season.
