= Louis Berlinguette =

Canadian ice hockey player

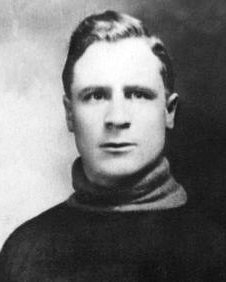
- Berlinguette in the 1919–20 season.
- Born: May 26, 1887 Sainte-Angélique, QC, CAN
- Died: June 1, 1959 (aged 72) Rouyn-Noranda, QC, CAN
- Height: 5 ft 11 in (180 cm)
- Weight: 175 lb (79 kg; 12 st 7 lb)
- Position: Left wing
- Shot: Left
- Played for: OPHL; Galt Professionals; NHA; Haileybury Comets; Montreal Canadiens; NHL; Montreal Canadiens; Montreal Maroons; Pittsburgh Pirates; WCHL; Saskatoon Sheiks; CAHL; Quebec Beavers
- Playing career: 1909–1927

Louis Dieudonné Berlinguette, last name occasionally spelt as Berlinquette, (May 26, 1887 – June 1, 1959) was a Canadian professional ice hockey left winger who played eight seasons in the National Hockey League for the Montreal Canadiens, Montreal Maroons and Pittsburgh Pirates. He also spent six seasons with the Canadiens in the National Hockey Association prior to the inception of the NHL.

Louis Berlinguette won the Stanley Cup with the Montreal Canadiens in 1916 against the Portland Rosebuds. He was also a member of the Canadiens when they played in the 1919 Stanley Cup Final against the Seattle Metropolitans, a series which was called off due to the Spanish flu pandemic with the two team having won two games each.

== Career statistics ==
=== Regular season and playoffs ===
			Regular season					Playoffs
Season	Team	League	GP	G	A	Pts	PIM	GP	G	A	Pts	PIM
1908–09	Haileybury Comets	TPHL	8	9	0	9	19	—	—	—	—	—
1909–10	Haileybury Comets	NHA	1	2	0	2	0	—	—	—	—	—
1910–11	Galt Professionals	OPHL	5	0	0	0	—	3	3	0	3	—
1910–11	Galt Professionals	St-Cup	—	—	—	—	—	1	2	0	2	—
1911–12	Montreal Canadiens	NHA	4	0	0	0	5	—	—	—	—	—
1911–12	Moncton Victorias	MaPHL	9	7	0	7	15	—	—	—	—	—
1911–12	Moncton Victorias	St-Cup	—	—	—	—	—	2	0	0	0	5
1912–13	Montreal Canadiens	NHA	16	4	0	4	14	—	—	—	—	—
1913–14	Montreal Canadiens	NHA	20	4	9	13	14	2	0	0	0	0
1914–15	Montreal Canadiens	NHA	20	2	1	3	40	—	—	—	—	—
1915–16	Montreal Canadiens	NHA	19	2	2	4	19	—	—	—	—	—
1915–16	Montreal Canadiens	St-Cup	—	—	—	—	—	1	0	0	0	0
1916–17	Montreal Canadiens	NHA	20	8	4	12	36	2	0	0	0	8
1916–17	Montreal Canadiens	St-Cup	—	—	—	—	—	3	0	0	0	0
1917–18	Montreal Canadiens	NHL	20	2	1	3	12	2	0	0	0	0
1918–19	Montreal Canadiens	NHL	18	5	3	8	9	5	0	3	3	9
1918–19	Montreal Canadiens	St-Cup	—	—	—	—	—	5	1	1	2	0
1919–20	Montreal Canadiens	NHL	24	8	9	17	36	—	—	—	—	—
1920–21	Montreal Canadiens	NHL	24	11	9	20	28	—	—	—	—	—
1921–22	Montreal Canadiens	NHL	24	13	5	18	10	—	—	—	—	—
1922–23	Montreal Canadiens	NHL	24	2	4	6	4	2	0	2	2	0
1923–24	Saskatoon Crescents	WCHL	29	9	6	15	9	—	—	—	—	—
1924–25	Montreal Maroons	NHL	29	4	2	6	22	—	—	—	—	—
1925–26	Pittsburgh Pirates	NHL	30	0	0	0	8	2	0	0	0	0
1926–27	Quebec Castors	Can-Am	19	3	3	6	31	—	—	—	—	—
St-Cup totals			—	—	—	—	—	13	3	1	4	—
NHA totals			100	22	16	38	128	4	0	0	0	8
NHL totals			193	45	33	78	129	11	0	5	5	9
