= Alf Skinner =

Canadian ice hockey player (1894-1961)

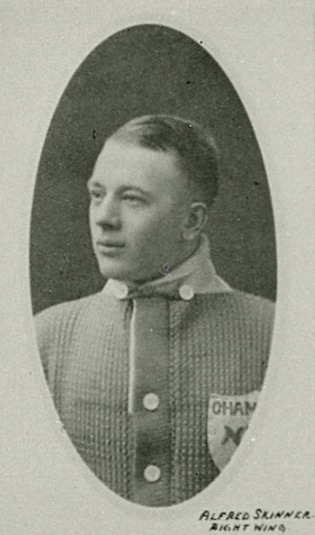
- Skinner with the Toronto Arenas.
- Born: January 26, 1894 Toronto, Ontario, Canada
- Died: April 11, 1961 (aged 67) Toronto, Ontario, Canada
- Height: 5 ft 10 in (178 cm)
- Weight: 180 lb (82 kg; 12 st 12 lb)
- Position: Right wing
- Shot: Right
- Played for: NHA; Toronto Shamrocks; Toronto Blueshirts; Montreal Wanderers; NHL; Toronto Arenas; Boston Bruins; Montreal Maroons; Pittsburgh Pirates; PCHA; Vancouver Millionaires; Vancouver Maroons; AHA; Duluth Hornets; CPHL; Kitchener Millionaires; Kitchener Flying Dutchmen
- Playing career: 1913–1930

Alfred "Dutch" Skinner (January 26, 1894 – April 11, 1961) was a Canadian ice hockey right winger. During his career, which lasted from 1913 to 1930, he played for several teams in the National Hockey Association, National Hockey League (NHL), and Pacific Coast Hockey Association. His longest tenure was with the Vancouver Millionaires (later Maroons) of the PCHA. With the Toronto Arenas he won the Stanley Cup in 1918, where he set four NHL records that remain unbroken over a hundred years later, and played for the Cup a further three times with Vancouver.

== Playing career ==
Skinner played junior hockey for the Toronto Argonauts (1911–12) and the Parkdale Canoe Club (1912–13) and senior hockey with the Toronto Rowing Club (1913–14). He turned professional in 1914 with the Toronto Shamrocks of the National Hockey Association. After one season, the team evolved into the Toronto Blueshirts. During the 1916–17 season, the league suspended operations of the Blueshirts, and Skinner finished the season with the Montreal Wanderers.

With the creation of the National Hockey League in 1917, Skinner returned to Toronto and played for the Stanley Cup-winning Toronto Arenas club, which consisted mostly of Toronto Blueshirts players. Skinner was the offensive star of the Cup championships, scoring eight goals in five games in the 1918 Stanley Cup Final.

During the 1917–18 NHL season Skinner was also involved in a violent tussle with Montreal Canadiens defenceman Joe Hall, during a game on January 28, 1918. Both players were arrested for assault and appeared in a Toronto court together on January 29 where both were released after being handed a suspended sentence.

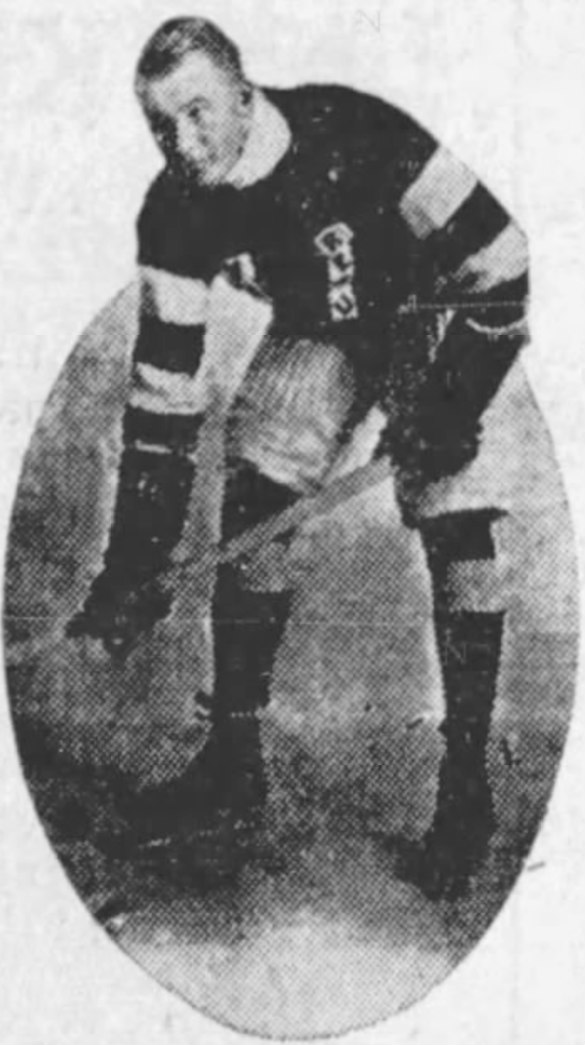
Skinner with the Vancouver Millionaires.

In 1919, Skinner went west to play for Vancouver in the Pacific Coast Hockey Association. The team unsuccessfully challenged for the Stanley Cup in 1921 and 1922. The 1920–21 season was Skinner's best, when he scored 20 goals in 24 games.

When the PCHA merged with the Western Canada Hockey League in 1924, Skinner returned to the NHL to play for the Boston Bruins. He was traded during the season to the Montreal Maroons and finished the year with just one goal in 27 games. He was signed by the Pittsburgh Pirates to start the 1925–26 season, but only played seven games with the team, ending his NHL career.

In 1926–27, Skinner played in the minor professional American Hockey Association for the Duluth Hornets. For the next two seasons, he was player-coach for Kitchener in the Canadian Professional Hockey League. When that league became the International Hockey League in 1929, Skinner became player-coach for the Guelph Maple Leafs in the new Canadian Professional Hockey League. He led the team to the championship in the league's only year of operations. He retired as a player in 1930.

Outside of hockey, Skinner was an employee of the City of Toronto and served a term as president of the Spadina Men's Progressive Conservative Association. He died in April, 1961 at age 67 at his home in Toronto and was buried at Mount Pleasant Cemetery, Toronto.

== Career statistics ==
=== Regular season and playoffs ===
			Regular season					Playoffs
Season	Team	League	GP	G	A	Pts	PIM	GP	G	A	Pts	PIM
1911–12	Toronto Argonauts	OHA Jr	—	—	—	—	—	—	—	—	—	—
1912–13	Toronto Parkdale Canoe Club	OHA Jr	—	—	—	—	—	—	—	—	—	—
1913–14	Toronto Rowing Club	OHA Sr	6	4	0	4	0	—	—	—	—	—
1914–15	Toronto Shamrocks	NHA	16	5	2	7	68	—	—	—	—	—
1915–16	Toronto Blueshirts	NHA	23	7	4	11	66	—	—	—	—	—
1916–17	Toronto Blueshirts	NHA	14	6	7	13	52	—	—	—	—	—
1916–17	Montreal Wanderers	NHA	6	5	0	5	23	—	—	—	—	—
1917–18	Toronto Arenas	NHL	20	13	5	18	28	2	0	1	1	9
1917–18	Toronto Arenas	St-Cup	—	—	—	—	—	5	8	2	10	18
1918–19	Toronto Arenas	NHL	17	12	4	16	26	—	—	—	—	—
1919–20	Vancouver Millionaires	PCHA	22	15	2	17	28	2	1	0	1	0
1920–21	Vancouver Millionaires	PCHA	24	20	4	24	22	2	3	1	4	6
1920–21	Vancouver Millionaires	St-Cup	—	—	—	—	—	3	4	0	4	14
1921–22	Vancouver Millionaires	PCHA	24	11	2	13	21	2	0	0	0	6
1921–22	Vancouver Millionaires	St-Cup	—	—	—	—	—	5	0	1	1	12
1922–23	Vancouver Maroons	PCHA	23	13	2	15	28	2	0	0	0	2
1922–23	Vancouver Maroons	St-Cup	—	—	—	—	—	3	1	1	2	6
1923–24	Vancouver Maroons	PCHA	29	5	2	7	38	2	0	0	0	2
1923–24	Vancouver Maroons	West-PO	—	—	—	—	—	3	0	0	0	0
1923–24	Vancouver Maroons	St-Cup	—	—	—	—	—	2	0	0	0	0
1924–25	Boston Bruins	NHL	10	0	0	0	15	—	—	—	—	—
1924–25	Montreal Maroons	NHL	17	1	1	2	16	—	—	—	—	—
1925–26	Pittsburgh Pirates	NHL	7	0	0	0	2	—	—	—	—	—
1926–27	Duluth Hornets	AHA	23	2	3	5	40	—	—	—	—	—
1927–28	Kitchener Millionaires	Can-Pro	18	4	0	4	42	—	—	—	—	—
1928–29	Kitchener Flying Dutchmen	Can-Am	39	14	5	19	63	3	0	0	0	10
1929–30	Guelph Maple Leafs	Can-Pro	—	—	—	—	—	—	—	—	—	—
NHA totals			59	23	13	36	209	—	—	—	—	—
PCHA/WHL totals			122	64	12	76	137	10	4	1	5	16
NHL totals			71	26	10	36	87	2	0	1	1	9

== NHL Records (4) ==
- Most multi-goal games, rookie, playoff year: 3 (tied with Jake Guentzel and Steve Thomas) in 1918.
- Most goals, rookie, Stanley Cup Final series: 8 in the 1918 Stanley Cup Final
- Most goals, rookie, Stanley Cup Final game: 3 (tied with Howie Morenz on March 23, 1918
- Most points, rookie, Stanley Cup Final series: 10 in the 1918 Stanley Cup Final
