= 1929–30 Canadian Professional Hockey League season =

The 1929–30 CPHL season was the first and only season of the reborn Canadian Professional Hockey League, a minor professional ice hockey league in Ontario, Canada. Four teams participated in the league, and the Guelph Maple Leafs won the championship.

== Regular season ==
Standings	GP	W	L	T	GF	GA	Pts
Guelph Maple Leafs	30	17	10	3	114	84	37
Galt Terriers	30	15	12	3	89	106	33
Kitchener Dutchmen	30	13	16	1	76	74	27
Brantford Indians	30	10	17	3	68	83	23

The rules of the league stipulated that if the third-place team finished four points or less behind the second place team then a semi final would be played between them. Kitchener finished six points behind Galt so no semi final was played.

== Final ==
Best of 5

Date	Winner	Loser	Location
March 18	Galt 6	Guelph 5	Kitchener
March 20	Guelph 2	Galt 1	Galt
March 22	Guelph 4	Galt 3	Kitchener
March 25	Guelph 7	Galt 4	Galt

Guelph Maple Leafs beat Galt Terriers 3 wins to
