= Morley Bruce =

Canadian ice hockey player

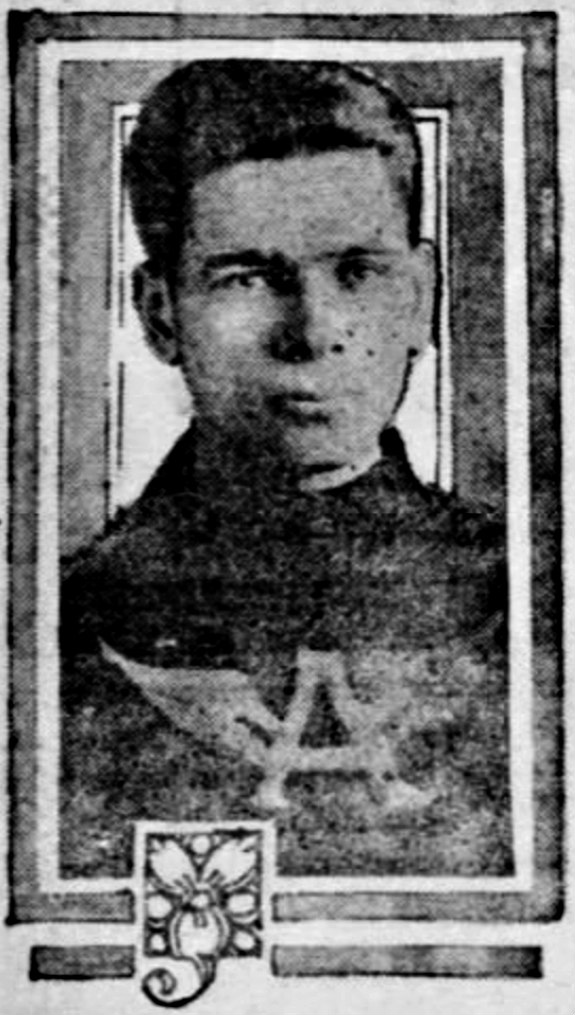
- Born: March 7, 1894 North Gower, Ontario, Canada
- Died: November 25, 1959 (aged 65) Ottawa, Ontario, Canada
- Height: 5 ft 9 in (175 cm)
- Weight: 170 lb (77 kg; 12 st 2 lb)
- Position: Defence
- Shot: Right
- Played for: Ottawa Senators
- Playing career: 1917–1922

Morley Callander "Rat" Bruce (March 7, 1894 – November 25, 1959) was a Canadian professional ice hockey defenceman who played for four seasons in the National Hockey League for the Ottawa Senators between 1917 and 1922. He won the Stanley Cup with Ottawa in 1920 and 1921.

== Playing career ==
Born in North Gower, Ontario, south of Ottawa, Bruce played ice hockey in the Ottawa City Hockey League for the Ottawa Aberdeens, New Edinburghs and Munitions. In 1917, he signed his first professional contract with the Ottawa Senators for the 1917–18 season. After the season, Bruce served for a year in the armed forces. When his tour was done, he returned to the Senators for three seasons from 1919 to 1920 through 1921–22, during which the Senators won two Stanley Cup championships.

While with the Ottawa Senators Bruce played mainly on defense, though while playing in the Ottawa City Hockey League he played forward, on the rover and centre positions.

== Personal life ==
Bruce married Ida Hughes. They had two daughters Gwendolyn and Barbara. Bruce died in Ottawa in 1959 and is interred in Norway Bay, Quebec. Ida Hughes outlived Bruce, living until 1996 when she died at the age of 98.

== Career statistics ==
=== Regular season and playoffs ===
| | | | Regular season | | | | | Playoffs |
| Season | Team | League | GP | G | A | Pts | PIM | GP | G | A | Pts | PIM |
|---|---|---|---|---|---|---|---|---|---|---|---|---|
| 1915–16 | Ottawa New Edinburghs | OCHL | 8 | 6 | 0 | 6 | 18 | 1 | 0 | 0 | 0 | 0 |
| 1916–17 | Ottawa Munitions | OCHL | 10 | 7 | 0 | 7 | 52 | — | — | — | — | — |
| 1917–18 | Ottawa Senators | NHL | 7 | 0 | 0 | 0 | 0 | — | — | — | — | — |
| 1919–20 | Ottawa Senators | NHL | 21 | 1 | 1 | 2 | 2 | — | — | — | — | — |
| 1919–20 | Ottawa Senators | St-Cup | — | — | — | — | — | 5 | 0 | 0 | 0 | 0 |
| 1920–21 | Ottawa Senators | NHL | 21 | 3 | 1 | 4 | 23 | 2 | 0 | 0 | 0 | 2 |
| 1920–21 | Ottawa Senators | St-Cup | — | — | — | — | — | 5 | 0 | 0 | 0 | 0 |
| 1921–22 | Ottawa Senators | NHL | 22 | 4 | 1 | 5 | 2 | 1 | 0 | 0 | 0 | 0 |
| NHL totals | | | 71 | 8 | 3 | 11 | 27 | 13 | 0 | 0 | 0 | 2 |
