= Harry Hyland =

Canadian ice hockey player (1889–1969)

- Hockey Hall of Fame, 1962
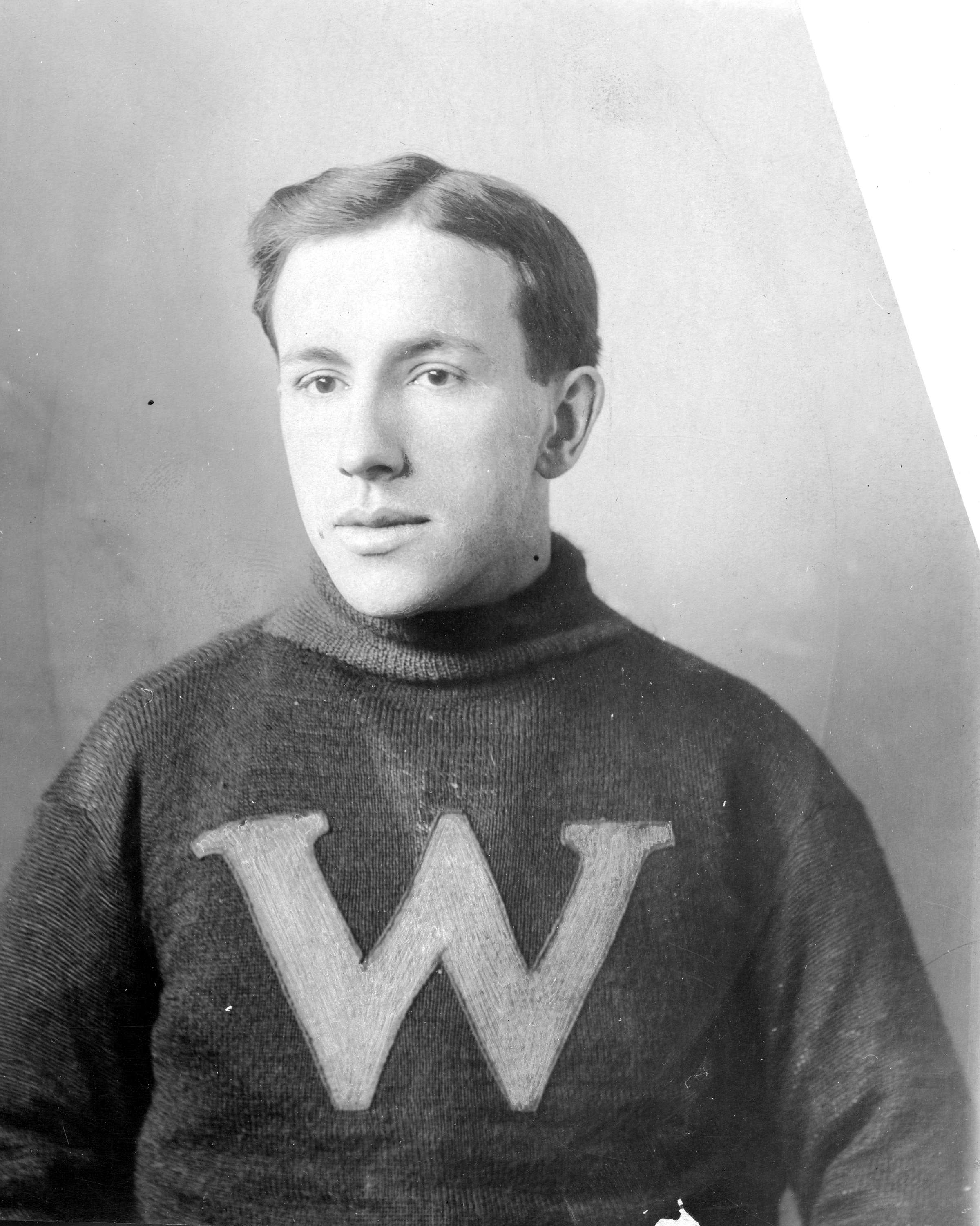
- Hyland with the New Westminster Royals in 1912
- Born: January 2, 1889 Montreal, Quebec, Canada
- Died: August 8, 1969 (aged 80) Montreal, Quebec, Canada
- Height: 5 ft 6 in (168 cm)
- Weight: 156 lb (71 kg; 11 st 2 lb)
- Position: Right wing
- Shot: Right
- Played for: Ottawa Senators; New Westminster Royals; Montreal Wanderers
- Playing career: 1908–1918

Harold Macarius Hyland (January 2, 1889 – August 8, 1969) was a Canadian professional ice hockey forward who played for the Montreal Wanderers, New Westminster Royals, and Ottawa Senators. He was a star in the early years of professional hockey. Hyland played in the inaugural 1917–18 NHL season, where he and Joe Malone scored five goals on the NHL's first day of play on December 19, 1917, setting three NHL rookie records that remain unbroken since.

== Playing career ==
Born in Montreal, Quebec, Hyland first played professional ice hockey for the Montreal Shamrocks in the Eastern Canada Amateur Hockey Association in 1908–09, joining the Montreal Wanderers of the National Hockey Association in 1909–10 when the club won the Stanley Cup. While with the Shamrocks he played as a center but switched to right wing with the Wanderers.

Hyland played for the Wanderers until they folded in 1918, except for one season in 1911–12 when he joined the Pacific Coast Hockey Association (PCHA) New Westminster Royals. With the Royals, he played as a rover. After the Wanderers folded, he joined the Ottawa Senators, where he was named playing coach. He retired the following year.

Hyland once scored eight goals in a game against the Quebec Bulldogs in 1912–13. He scored the first hat trick in National Hockey League history, playing in the league's very first game on December 19, 1917, in which Hyland's Wanderers defeated the Toronto Arenas 10–9, in Montreal.

Hyland also played lacrosse, and in 1911 he was a teammate of Newsy Lalonde and Mickey Ion in the Vancouver Lacrosse Club. He was also a member of the Montreal Shamrocks lacrosse team playing as a home fielder.

Hyland was inducted into the Hockey Hall of Fame in 1962.

=== Coaching ===
Concurrently with his playing career in Montreal Hyland also coached hockey at Loyola College.

== Career statistics ==
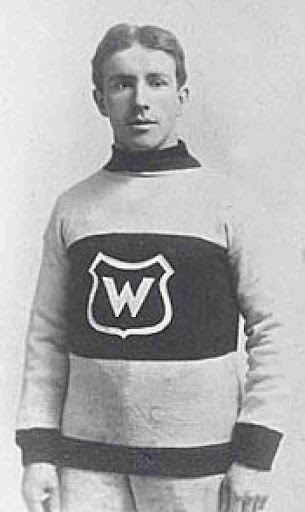
Hyland with the Montreal Wanderers in 1910

			Regular season					Playoffs
Season	Team	League	GP	G	A	Pts	PIM	GP	G	A	Pts	PIM
1908–09	Montreal Shamrocks	ECHA	11	19	0	19	36	—	—	—	—	—
1909–10	Montreal Wanderers	NHA	12	24	0	24	23	—	—	—	—	—
1909–10	Montreal Wanderers	St-Cup	—	—	—	—	—	1	3	0	3	3
1910–11	Montreal Wanderers	NHA	15	14	0	14	43	—	—	—	—	—
1911–12	New Westminster Royals	PCHA	15	26	0	26	44	—	—	—	—	—
1912–13	Montreal Wanderers	NHA	20	27	0	27	38	—	—	—	—	—
1913–14	Montreal Wanderers	NHA	18	30	12	42	18	—	—	—	—	—
1914–15	Montreal Wanderers	NHA	19	23	6	29	49	2	0	0	0	26
1915–16	Montreal Wanderers	NHA	20	14	0	14	69	—	—	—	—	—
1916–17	Montreal Wanderers	NHA	13	12	2	14	21	—	—	—	—	—
1917–18	Montreal Wanderers	NHL	4	6	1	7	6	—	—	—	—	—
1917–18	Ottawa Senators	NHL	13	8	1	9	59	—	—	—	—	—
NHA totals			117	144	20	164	261	2	0	0	0	26
NHL totals			17	14	2	16	65	—	—	—	—	—

== NHL Records (3) ==
- Most goals, rookie, game: 5 (tied with four other players) on December 19, 1917
- Most goals, rookie, first NHL game: 5 (tied with Joe Malone) on December 19, 1917
- Most points, rookie, first NHL game: 5 (tied with Al Hill and Joe Malone) on December 19, 1917

== Awards and achievements ==
- 1909–10 – Stanley Cup champion
- 1962 – Inducted into the Hockey Hall of Fame

== See also ==
- List of players with five or more goals in an NHL game

Preceded by Eddie Gerard	Head coach of the Ottawa Senators (original); 1918–1919	Succeeded by Pete Green
