= Evariste Payer =

Canadian ice hockey player

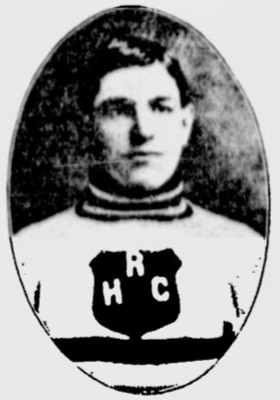
- Payer with the Rockland Hockey Club.
- Born: July 21, 1888 Rockland, Ontario, Canada
- Died: September 1, 1963 (aged 75)
- Height: 5 ft 6 in (168 cm)
- Weight: 150 lb (68 kg; 10 st 10 lb)
- Position: Centre
- Shot: Left
- Played for: Montreal Canadiens
- Playing career: 1909–1918

Évariste Albert Payer (July 21, 1888 – September 1, 1963) was a Canadian ice hockey centre. He played 9 games with the Montreal Canadiens in the National Hockey Association (NHA) from 1910 to 1912, and one game for the Canadiens in the National Hockey League (NHL) during the 1917–18 season.

== Playing career ==
Payer played for the Montreal Canadiens in the National Hockey Association (NHA) during the 1910–11 and 1911–12 seasons. He then played senior hockey until 1915, when he joined the army. He re-joined the Canadiens in the NHA's successor National Hockey League (NHL) in 1917–18. Payer would play only 1 game in the NHL, on January 5, 1918 against the Ottawa Senators. His death is recorded as September 1, 1963 on his gravestone at Notre Dame Cemetery in Gatineau, Quebec.

== Career statistics ==
=== Regular season and playoffs ===
			Regular season					Playoffs
Season	Team	League	GP	G	A	Pts	PIM	GP	G	A	Pts	PIM
1910–11	Montreal Canadiens	NHA	5	0	0	0	3	—	—	—	—	—
1911–12	Montreal Canadiens	NHA	4	1	0	1	0	—	—	—	—	—
1911–12	Montreal Hochelaga	MCHL	7	6	0	6	6	—	—	—	—	—
1912–13	Montreal Champêtre	MCHL	12	13	0	13	15	1	1	0	1	0
1913–14	Montreal Champêtre	MCHL	10	10	0	10	20	—	—	—	—	—
1914–15	Rockland Seniors	LOHA	5	0	0	0	3	—	—	—	—	—
1917–18	Montreal Canadiens	NHL	1	0	0	0	0	—	—	—	—	—
1917–18	Rockland Seniors	LOHA	—	—	—	—	—	—	—	—	—	—
NHA totals			9	1	0	1	3	—	—	—	—	—
NHL totals			1	0	0	0	0	—	—	—	—	—
