= Sammy Hebert =

Canadian ice hockey player

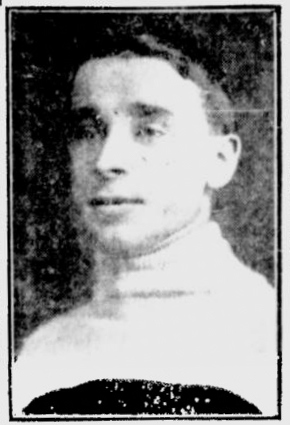
- Born: March 31, 1893 Ottawa, Ontario, Canada
- Died: July 23, 1965 (aged 72)
- Height: 5 ft 10 in (178 cm)
- Weight: 145 lb (66 kg; 10 st 5 lb)
- Position: Goaltender
- Caught: Right
- Played for: Toronto Ontarios (NHA); Ottawa Senators (NHA/NHL); Quebec Bulldogs (NHA); Toronto (NHL); Saskatoon Sheiks (WCHL)
- Playing career: 1913–1924

Samuel James Hebert (March 31, 1893 – July 23, 1965) was a Canadian ice hockey goaltender. He played professionally from 1913 until 1924 in the National Hockey Association (NHA), National Hockey League (NHL) and Western Canada Hockey League (WCHL). He played for the Toronto Ontarios, Ottawa Senators, Toronto Arenas, and Saskatoon Sheiks.

== Playing career ==
Born in Ottawa, Ontario, Hebert played for several amateur teams in Ottawa before turning professional in 1913 with the Toronto Ontarios of the NHA. In December 1914, he returned home and traded to the Ottawa Senators for Skene Ronan. He played two games for Ottawa in the 1914–15 season before joining the military. After a year in the military, Hebert returned to professional hockey as a member of the Senators. He was part of a three-way trade with Ottawa and Montreal, ending up with the Quebec Bulldogs for the balance of the 1916–17 season.

After the suspension of the NHA in 1917, Hebert signed with the Torontos of the NHL, playing two games before being traded to Ottawa for cash. He played the following seasons in amateur competition, returning to professional hockey with the Saskatoon Sheiks of the WCHL in 1921. He played two seasons with Saskatoon before rejoining the Senators in 1924, playing two final games with the Senators to end his career.

== Career statistics ==
=== Regular season and playoffs ===
			Regular season								Playoffs
Season	Team	League	GP	W	L	T	Min	GA	SO	GAA	GP	W	L	T	Min	GA	SO	GAA
1910–11	Ottawa City Cedar	OHA Int	—	—	—	—	—	—	—	—	—	—	—	—	—	—	—	—
1911–12	Ottawa Stewartons	IPAHU	6	2	3	0	375	35	0	5.60	—	—	—	—	—	—	—	—
1912–13	Ottawa Stewartons	OCHL	—	—	—	—	—	—	—	—	—	—	—	—	—	—	—	—
1913–14	Ottawa New Edinburghs	Exhib	1	1	0	0	60	3	0	3.00	—	—	—	—	—	—	—	—
1913–14	Toronto Ontarios	NHA	19	4	15	0	1160	108	0	5.59	—	—	—	—	—	—	—	—
1914–15	Ottawa Senators	NHA	2	0	0	0	23	1	0	2.61	—	—	—	—	—	—	—	—
1914–15	Ottawa New Edinburghs	OCHL	—	—	—	—	—	—	—	—	—	—	—	—	—	—	—	—
1916–17	Quebec Bulldogs	NHA	15	7	6	0	874	95	0	6.52	—	—	—	—	—	—	—	—
1916–17	Ottawa Senators	NHA	1	0	1	0	60	8	0	8.00	—	—	—	—	—	—	—	—
1917–18	Toronto Arenas	NHL	2	1	0	0	80	10	0	7.50	—	—	—	—	—	—	—	—
1917–18	Ottawa Ordinance Corps	ONDHL	—	—	—	—	—	—	—	—	—	—	—	—	—	—	—	—
1919–20	Ottawa City Cedar	OCHL	—	—	—	—	—	—	—	—	—	—	—	—	—	—	—	—
1920–21	Ottawa City Cedar	OCHL	—	—	—	—	—	—	—	—	—	—	—	—	—	—	—	—
1921–22	Saskatoon/Moose Jaw Crescents	WCHL	23	5	18	0	1380	131	0	5.70	—	—	—	—	—	—	—	—
1922–23	Saskatoon Sheiks	WCHL	19	4	13	2	1219	79	0	3.89	—	—	—	—	—	—	—	—
1923–24	Ottawa Senators	NHL	2	1	1	0	120	9	0	4.50	—	—	—	—	—	—	—	—
NHL totals			4	2	1	0	200	19	0	5.70	—	—	—	—	—	—	—	—

=== Transactions ===
- December 29, 1913 – Signed as a free agent by Toronto Ontarios.
- December 25, 1914 – Traded to Ottawa Senators by Toronto Ontarios/Shamrocks with cash for Skene Ronan
- December 5, 1917 – Signed as a free agent by Toronto (NHL).
- January 16, 1917 – Traded to Montreal Canadiens by Ottawa for Jack Fournier.
- January 16, 1917 – Traded to Quebec Bulldogs by Montreal Canadiens for Tommy Smith.
- January 24, 1917 – Loaned to Ottawa by Quebec as an emergency replacement for Clint Benedict (Toronto 8, Ottawa 5).
- February 11, 1918 – Traded to Ottawa by Toronto for cash.
- November 25, 1919 – Rights awarded to Quebec when the team was activated in the NHL.
- December 2, 1921 – Signed as a free agent by Saskatoon (WCHL).
- February 1, 1922 – Transferred to Moose Jaw (WCHL) after the Saskatoon franchise relocated.
- October 26, 1922 – Returned to Saskatoon after Moose Jaw franchise relocated.
- February 29, 1924 – Signed as a free agent by Ottawa.

Source: "Sammy Hebert (player notes)". NHL.

== Personal life ==
Sammy Hebert had a wife, two sons, and a daughter as well as six grandchildren.
