= Art Brooks =

Canadian ice hockey player

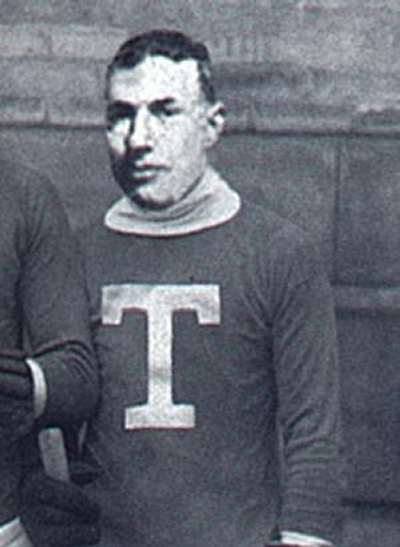
- Born: February 4, 1889 Guelph, Ontario, Canada
- Died: January 1, 1962 (aged 72) Toronto, Ontario, Canada
- Height: 5 ft 9 in (175 cm)
- Weight: 170 lb (77 kg; 12 st 2 lb)
- Position: Goaltender/Defence
- Shot: Left
- Caught: Right
- Played for: Toronto Blueshirts (NHA); Montreal Canadiens (NHA); Toronto Arenas (NHL)
- Playing career: 1906–1918

James Arthur Brooks (February 4, 1889 – January 1, 1962) was a Canadian ice hockey goaltender who played in both the National Hockey Association (NHA) and the early years of the National Hockey League (NHL). Between 1916 and 1919, he appeared in two games each for the Toronto Blueshirts, the Montreal Canadiens, and the Toronto Arenas. Although the Arenas captured the Stanley Cup in 1918, Brooks had been released before the championship and was not part of the final roster.

== Playing career ==
Born in Guelph, Ontario, Brooks began his hockey career with the Guelph Lyons of the Ontario Hockey Association (OHA) during the 1906–07 season. He turned professional in 1908–09 with the Duquesne Athletic Club of the Western Pennsylvania Hockey League. After moving to Owen Sound, Ontario, he played amateur hockey with the Owen Sound Seniors of the OHA until enlisting in the military in 1914. Following his discharge in 1916, Brooks joined the Toronto Blueshirts of the NHA for their shortened 1916–17 season. When the Blueshirts were taken over by the Toronto Arena Company the next year, Brooks appeared in four games for the team during their Stanley Cup-winning campaign but was released after the team signed goaltender Hap Holmes. Notably, Brooks was the starting goalie for Toronto in the first-ever NHL game, a 10–9 loss to the Montreal Wanderers, and also played in the following three games. He retired from professional hockey at the end of that season.

== Career statistics ==
=== Regular season and playoffs ===
			Regular season								Playoffs
Season	Team	League	GP	W	L	T	Min	GA	SO	GAA	GP	W	L	T	Min	GA	SO	GAA
1906–07	Guelph Lyons	OHA Jr	3	3	0	0	180	8	0	2.67	—	—	—	—	—	—	—	—
1908–09	Duquesne Athletic Club	WPHL	4	0	3	1	250	19	0	4.56	—	—	—	—	—	—	—	—
1909–10	Owen Sound Seniors	OHA Sr	—	—	—	—	—	—	—	—	—	—	—	—	—	—	—	—
1910–11	Owen Sound Seniors	OHA Sr	—	—	—	—	—	—	—	—	—	—	—	—	—	—	—	—
1911–12	Guelph Maple Leafs	OHA Sr	—	—	—	—	—	—	—	—	—	—	—	—	—	—	—	—
1912–13	Owen Sound Seniors	OHA Sr	—	—	—	—	—	—	—	—	—	—	—	—	—	—	—	—
1916–17	Toronto Blueshirts	NHA	4	2	2	0	238	16	0	4.03	—	—	—	—	—	—	—	—
1917–18	Toronto Arenas	NHL	4	2	2	0	220	23	0	6.27	—	—	—	—	—	—	—	—
NHL totals			4	2	2	0	238	16	0	4.03	—	—	—	—	—	—	—	—
NHA totals			4	2	2	0	220	23	0	6.27	—	—	—	—	—	—	—	—

== Transactions ==
- November 1, 1908 – Signed as a free agent by Pittsburgh (WPHL)
- January 8, 1917 – Suspended by USAHA for signing an amateur contract with NY Irish Americans (AAHL).
- January 30, 1917 – Signed as a free agent by Toronto (NHA).
- February 11, 1917 – Claimed by Montreal Canadiens (NHA) from Toronto (NHA) in a dispersal draft.
- December 15, 1917 – Signed as a free agent by Toronto (NHL).

Source: "NHL.com - Players: Art Brooks". NHL.
