= 1917–18 NHL season =

Professional ice hockey league season

- League: National Hockey League
- Sport: Ice hockey
- Duration: December 19, 1917 – March 6, 1918
- Games: 22
- Teams: 4 (3 by January 1918)

Regular season
- Top scorer: Joe Malone (Canadiens)

League
- Champions: Toronto Hockey Club
- Runners-up: Montreal Canadiens

NHL seasons
- ← 1916–17 (NHA) 1918–19 →

The 1917–18 NHL season was the first season of the National Hockey League (NHL). The league was formed after the suspension of the National Hockey Association (NHA). Unwilling to continue dealing with Toronto Blueshirts owner Eddie Livingstone, the other NHA team owners formed the NHL, initially as a temporary measure after realizing the NHA constitution did not allow them to force Livingstone out. The Montreal Canadiens, Montreal Wanderers, and Ottawa Senators moved to the NHL. A then-temporary team, the Toronto Hockey Club, was formed to replace Livingstone's team, but the club played without an official nickname for the season. Meanwhile, the Quebec Bulldogs suspended operations prior to the season.

The NHL constitution and rules basically were the same as the NHA. Play was held in two halves, December 19 to February 4, and February 6 to March 6. The Canadiens won the first half, and Toronto the second half. The Wanderers withdrew early in January 1918 after their rink, the Westmount Arena, burned down. Toronto won the NHL playoff and then won the Stanley Cup, by defeating the PCHA's Vancouver Millionaires three games to two in a best-of-five series.

== League business ==
In November 1917, the owners of the NHA, apparently unwilling to continue the league with Toronto NHA owner Eddie Livingstone, decided to suspend the NHA and form a new league, the NHL, without Livingstone.

The Quebec franchise had problems with the war in Europe as many of its players were in the armed forces, and there was trouble getting replacements for them. They tried merging with the local Sons of Ireland team, but that team refused to turn professional. Quebec kept its operation plans going, but it was becoming obvious to the other owners that Quebec would not be able to ice a team this season.

On October 19, a meeting of the NHA board of directors was held. Livingstone did not attend, sending lawyer Eddie Barclay. Barclay was informed by the directors that Toronto would not play in the 1917–18 season due to the difficulty of operating a five-team league, both in scheduling and availability of players during wartime. Livingstone then publicly announced that he would set up an international circuit and raid the NHA players.

On November 9, 1917, it was reported that the Toronto NHA franchise was sold to Charles Querrie of the Toronto Arena corporation. At this point, NHA president Robertson and secretary Frank Calder denied that the NHA would change, dissolve or adopt other subterfuge. This sale never completed.

The November 10, 1917, annual meeting of the NHA was presided over by Calder, and attended by Martin Rosenthal and E.P Dey for Ottawa; Sam Lichtenhein for the Wanderers; George Kennedy for the Canadiens and M. J. Quinn and Charles Fremont for Quebec. At the meeting, Livingstone was represented by J. F. Boland, who stated that if the league operated, that the Toronto franchise intended to be a full member. The NHA voted to suspend operations but not wind up the organization and meet in one year's time. As reported by The Globe, there was a movement to form a new four-team league of Toronto, Ottawa and the two Montreal teams. The Toronto representative offered to allow the Arena Gardens to manage the Torontos and lease the players.

There then followed a period of speculation in the newspapers as to whether Quebec would play in the new season and what would be the league organization. One name for the new league was speculated: the "National Professional Hockey League". If Quebec could play then the Toronto players would be dispersed; if Quebec could not play then the Toronto players would be loaned to a temporary Toronto franchise. Representatives of Ottawa, Quebec, and the Montreal teams met on November 22, 1917, but adjourned without a decision.

On November 26, 1917, representatives of the Ottawa, Quebec, and Montreal NHA clubs met at the Windsor Hotel in Montreal. The decision to start a new league was finalized and announced. The decision was made to start a new league, the National Hockey League, with the following provisions:

- Constitution and rules the same as the NHA, including the split regular season format, and the winners of both haves playing each other for the league championship
- Frank Calder elected president and secretary
- M. J. Quinn of Quebec was named honorary president
- Franchises were granted to Ottawa, Canadiens, Wanderers
- Quebec players to be dispersed among the other teams

A Toronto franchise was to be operated 'temporarily' by the Arena Gardens while the Toronto ownership situation was resolved. The franchise used the players of the Blueshirts, including those who had been transferred to other NHA teams for the second half of the 1916–17 NHA season. While Livingstone agreed to a lease of the team, the NHL owners did not intend to share any revenues from the players. Livingstone would sue for the team's revenues in 1918. George Kennedy, owner of the Canadiens, would later say:

"The Toronto players belong as a body to the National Hockey League, for they were only loaned to the Toronto Arena Company, though Livingstone tried to make the Arena Company believe that he controlled those players"

The team played without a nickname for the season.

According to Holzman, the NHL itself was intended to operate temporarily until the Toronto NHA franchise was resolved. The NHA had a pending lawsuit against the 228th Battalion, and could or would not fold until after that was heard.

=== Quebec dispersal draft ===
According to McFarlane, the owners of the Quebec franchise asked $200 per man selected; but the amount received by the franchise is not recorded. The Wanderers took four players, but overlooked Joe Malone, who was picked up by the Canadiens, who also took Joe Hall. Odie Cleghorn and Sprague Cleghorn joined the Wanderers, but Sprague broke a leg and was sidelined. and Odie got an exemption from the army on the condition he not play hockey this season. As a result of losing the Cleghorns, owner Sam Lichtenhein threatened to fold the Wanderers unless he got all of Quebec's players. The other owners had little sympathy and George Kennedy of the Canadiens pointed out that Lichtenhein could have chosen Malone in the draft. After this exchange of words, Lichtenhein and manager Art Ross decided to keep quiet for the time being.

=== Rule changes ===
On January 9, 1918, the league decided to allow goaltenders to drop to the ice surface in order to make saves. This was the first implemented and amended rule change in the National Hockey League. It was done in response to Ottawa's Clint Benedict constantly falling to make saves. According to NHL president Frank Calder, "As far as I am concerned they can stand on their head(s)."

== Regular season ==
The new league faced stiff competition for players from the rival Pacific Coast Hockey Association (PCHA). Also, filling rosters was a challenge because many players were fighting in World War I.

The Wanderers were in trouble from the start of the season. They won their home opener but drew only 700 fans. The Wanderers then lost the next three games and owner Lichtenhein threatened to withdraw from the league unless he could get some players. Although they could have acquired Joe Malone in the draft, they turned to the PCHA and in exchange for waiving their claim on Gordon Roberts, signed goaltender Hap Holmes.They immediately offered him to Toronto for Reg Noble. Toronto turned down the deal, but kept the door open for obtaining Holmes. The Wanderers also obtained permission to sign such players as Frank Foyston, Jack Walker and others if they could do so. The Wanderers loaned Holmes to the Seattle Metropolitans of the PCHA, but he eventually found his way back to the NHL when Seattle loaned him to Toronto.

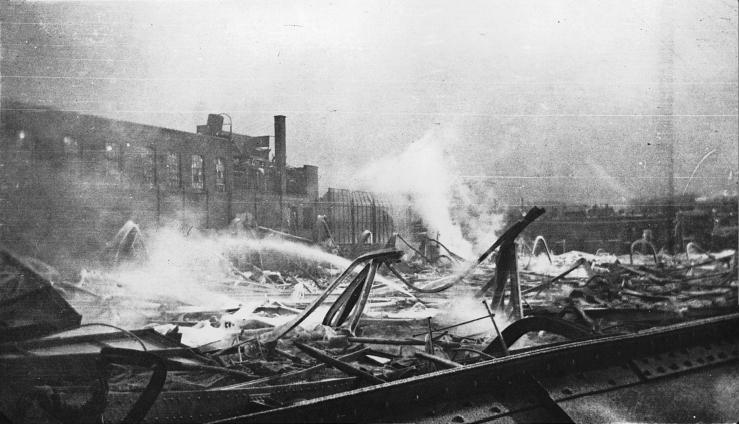
Ruins of Westmount Arena

A league meeting was planned to deal with the situation, but on January 2, 1918, the matter was resolved when the Westmount Arena burned down, leaving the Canadiens and Wanderers homeless. The Canadiens moved into the 3,250 seat Jubilee Rink. The Hamilton arena offered to provide a home for the Wanderers, but Lichtenhein disbanded the team on January 4, after the other clubs refused to give him any players. The League awarded forfeit wins to the Arenas and Canadiens, who were meant to be the next opponents of the Wanderers. Despite the forfeit, Toronto proceeded with its “game” despite the lack of opposition. At 8:05 p.m. on the 5th of January, six Toronto players—including goalie Harry Homes—took to the ice at Mutual Arena. A referee dropped the puck, and Cy Denneny carried it down the ice and shot it into the empty net.

The remaining three teams would complete the season. The last active player from the inaugural season was Reg Noble, who retired following the 1933 Stanley Cup playoffs.

=== Highlights ===
The first two games of the season, and in league history, took place in Ottawa and Montreal on the evening of December 19, 1917. The visiting Montreal Canadiens defeated the Ottawa Senators 7–4 in Ottawa, with Joe Malone scoring five of Montreal's seven goals. In Montreal, the unnamed Toronto team lost to the Montreal Wanderers 10–9. Harry Hyland had five goals in the Wanderers' victory, which would be their only one in the NHL. The game in Montreal was played in front of only 700 fans.

Knowing which game is the first in league history is not precisely known, but it is likely the Montreal game. The actual start times of each game are unknown, but the Ottawa game was scheduled for 8:30 pm, and the Montreal game for 8:15 pm. Reports of the games indicated that the Wanderers game started on time, while a contract dispute may have delayed the start of the Ottawa game. Similarly, the first goal scorer cannot be verified conclusively. In Montreal, the Wanderer's Dave Ritchie scored at the one minute mark, while Joe Malone scored at the six-minute mark in Ottawa. One hundred years later, Ottawa and the Canadiens played the NHL 100 Classic game outdoors in Ottawa to mark the anniversary.

On January 28, when the Canadiens visited Toronto, players Alf Skinner and Joe Hall got into a stick-swinging duel. Both players received match penalties, $15 fines and were arrested by the Toronto Police for disorderly conduct, for which they received suspended sentences.

In February, Ken Randall of Toronto was suspended pending payment of $35 in fines to the league. He brought $32 in paper money and 300 pennies. The pennies were refused. He tossed his bag of pennies onto the ice prior to the game against Ottawa, and one of the Ottawa players banged it with his stick, scattering the pennies around the ice. The game was delayed while the pennies were picked up.

=== Final standings ===
First half
Pos	Team	Pld	W	L	T	GF	GA	GD	Pts	Qualification
1	Montreal Canadiens	14	10	4	0	81	47	+34	20	Qualification for the playoffs
2	Toronto Hockey Club	14	8	6	0	71	75	−4	16	
3	Ottawa Senators	14	5	9	0	67	79	−12	10	
4	Montreal Wanderers	6	1	5	0	17	35	−18	2	Withdrew from the season (Note: The Wanderers defaulted scheduled games against the Canadiens (January 2, 1918) and Toronto (January 5, 1918), while their arena burned down, these appear as losses in the standings, but the games were not played. "The league did not accept the Wanderers' resignation immediately, electing to wait and see whether the team showed up for its scheduled match in Toronto on Saturday January 5. ... The deadline did expire, and the once-powerful team that had been known as the Little Men of Iron was thrown onto the scrap heap of hockey history. The Wanderers' scheduled games of January 2 and 5 were officially recorded in the standings as victories for their respective opponents, the Canadiens and Torontos." — Holzman.)

Source: Hockey-reference
Notes:

Second half
Pos	Team	Pld	W	L	T	GF	GA	GD	Pts	Qualification
1	Toronto Hockey Club	8	5	3	0	37	34	+3	10	Qualification for the playoffs
2	Ottawa Senators	8	4	4	0	35	35	0	8	
3	Montreal Canadiens	8	3	5	0	34	37	−3	6	

Source: Hockey-reference

== Playoffs ==
=== NHL Championship ===
Montreal had won the first half of the NHL split season with 20 points and Toronto had won the second half with 10. The two teams then played a two-game total goals series for the NHL championship. This was Toronto's first playoff series. These two teams split their ten-game regular season series.

The series saw much fighting involving Bert Corbeau and Newsy Lalonde. Toronto won the series. In 1921, when the NHA's dormant O'Brien Cup was reinstated by the NHL as an award to its league playoff champions, this 1918 championship was engraved on the Cup.

==== Montreal Canadiens vs. Toronto Hockey Club ====
March 11	Montreal Canadiens	3–7	Toronto Hockey Club	Arena Gardens	Recap
Georges Vezina		Goalie stats	Hap Holmes

March 13	Toronto Hockey Club	3–4	Montreal Canadiens	Montreal Arena	Recap
Georges Vezina		Goalie stats	Hap Holmes

Toronto won series on total goals 10–7

=== Stanley Cup 'World Series' ===
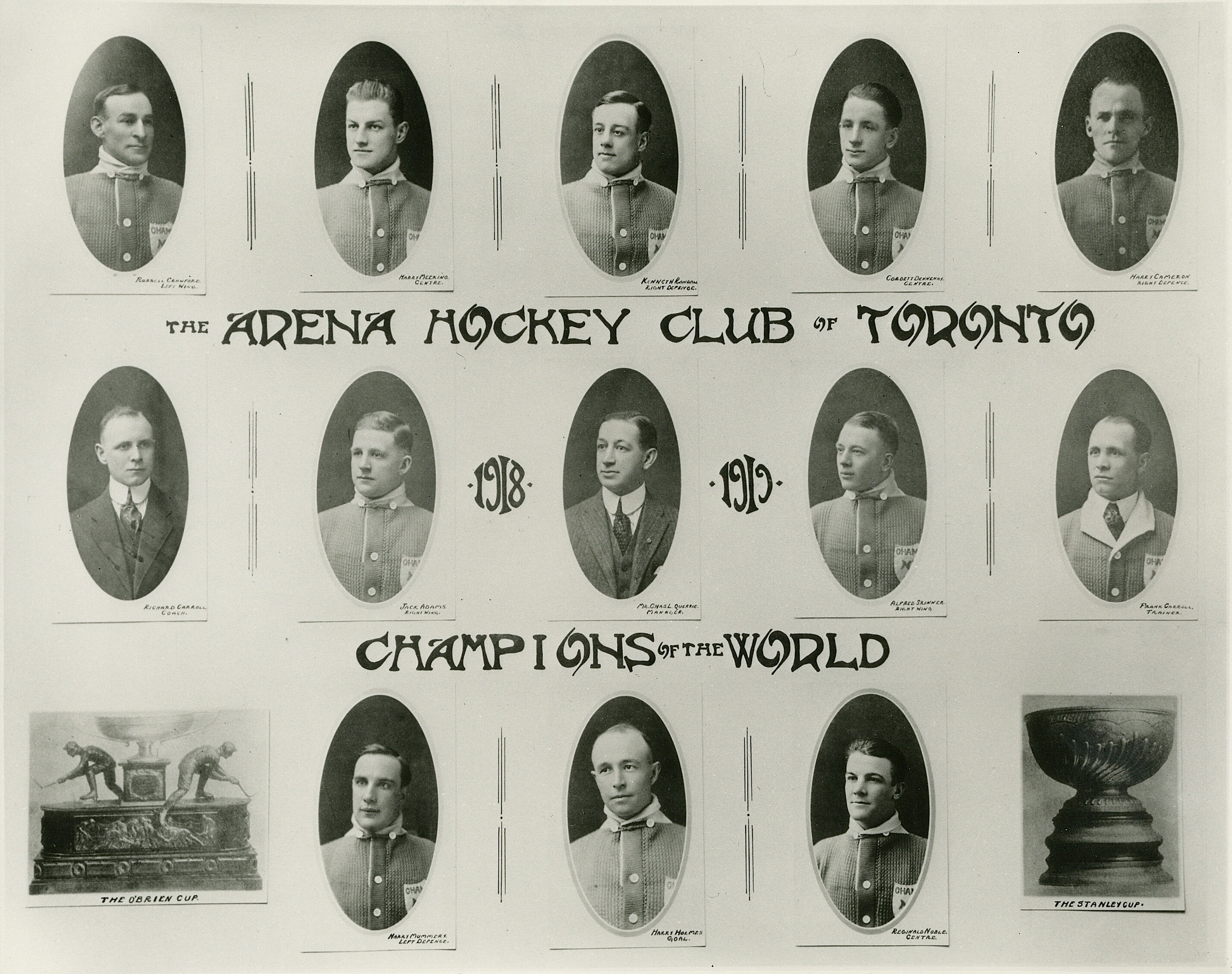
1917–18 season Toronto Arenas. Top row, from left: Rusty Crawford, Harry Meeking, Ken Randall, Corbett Denneny, Harry Cameron. Middle row, from left: Dick Carroll, Jack Adams, Charles Querrie, Alf Skinner, Frank Carroll. Bottom row, from left: O'Brien Cup, Harry Mummery, Harry "Hap" Holmes, Reg Noble, Stanley Cup.

The championship series was played at Arena Gardens in Toronto. The games alternated between seven-man PCHA rules and NHL six-man rules. This was the first playoff meeting between these two teams. Toronto won all three games played under NHL rules, and Vancouver won the two games played under PCHA rules. Although Vancouver's Mickey MacKay was described as sensational in the fifth and deciding game, it was Corbett Denneny of Toronto who scored the winning goal and Toronto won the Stanley Cup.

March 20	Vancouver Millionaires	3–5	Toronto Hockey Club	Arena Gardens	Recap
Hugh Lehman		Goalie stats	Hap Holmes

March 23	Toronto Hockey Club	4–6	Vancouver Millionaires	Arena Gardens	Recap
Hap Holmes		Goalie stats	Hugh Lehman

March 26	Vancouver Millionaires	3–6	Toronto Hockey Club	Arena Gardens	Recap
Hugh Lehman		Goalie stats	Hap Holmes

March 28	Toronto Hockey Club	1–8	Vancouver Millionaires	Arena Gardens	Recap
Hap Holmes		Goalie stats	Hugh Lehman

March 30	Vancouver Millionaires	1–2	Toronto Hockey Club	Arena Gardens	Recap
Hugh Lehman		Goalie stats	Hap Holmes

Toronto won series 3–2

== Schedule and results ==
=== Results ===
First half

Month	Day	Visitor	Score	Home	Score
Dec.	19	Canadiens	7	Ottawa	4
Dec.	19	Toronto	9	Wanderers	10
Dec.	22	Ottawa	4	Toronto	11
Dec.	22	Canadiens	11	Wanderers	2
Dec.	26	Ottawa	6	Wanderers	3
Dec.	26	Canadiens	5	Toronto	7
Dec.	29	Wanderers	2	Ottawa	9
Dec.	29	Toronto	2	Canadiens	9
Jan.	2	Toronto	6	Ottawa	5
Jan.	2†	Wanderers	–	Canadiens	–
Jan.	5	Ottawa	5	Canadiens	6 (OT 27")
Jan.	5†	Wanderers	–	Toronto	–
Jan.	9	Canadiens	4	Toronto	6
Jan.	12	Ottawa	4	Canadiens	9
Jan.	14	Toronto	6	Ottawa	9
Jan.	16	Ottawa	4	Toronto	5
Jan.	19	Toronto	1	Canadiens	5
Jan.	21	Canadiens	5	Ottawa	3
Jan.	23	Ottawa	4	Canadiens	3
Jan.	26	Toronto	3	Ottawa	6
Jan.	28	Canadiens	1	Toronto	5
Jan.	30	Canadiens	5	Ottawa	2
Feb.	2	Toronto	2	Canadiens	11
Feb.	4	Ottawa	2	Toronto	8

† Montreal Arena burned down and Wanderers withdraw. Two Wanderers games count as wins for Canadiens and Toronto.

Second half

Month	Day	Visitor	Score	Home	Score
Feb.	6	Canadiens	3	Ottawa	6
Feb.	9	Toronto	7	Canadiens	3
Feb.	11	Ottawa	1	Toronto	3
Feb.	13	Toronto	6	Ottawa	1
Feb.	16	Ottawa	4	Canadiens	10
Feb.	18	Canadiens	9	Toronto	0
Feb.	20	Toronto	4	Canadiens	5
Feb.	23	Ottawa	3	Toronto	9
Feb.	25	Canadiens	0	Ottawa	8
Feb.	27	Ottawa	3	Canadiens	1 (at Quebec)
Mar.	2	Canadiens	3	Toronto	5
Mar.	6	Toronto	3	Ottawa	9

== Awards ==
- NHL champion – Toronto Hockey Club

Note:

The O'Brien Cup, still considered the championship trophy of the NHA, was not awarded in 1918. It remained under the care of the Canadiens who had won it in 1917, until the death of their owner, George Kennedy, in 1921, when the NHL made arrangements to re-use the trophy. The Hockey Hall of Fame lists Toronto as the winner for 1917–18.

== Player statistics ==
=== Scoring leaders ===
GP = Games Played, G = Goals, A = Assists, Pts = Points, PIM = Penalties In Minutes

Player	Team	GP	G	A	Pts	PIM
Joe Malone	Montreal Canadiens	20	44	4	48	30
Cy Denneny	Ottawa Senators	20	36	10	46	80
Reg Noble	Toronto	20	30	10	40	35
Newsy Lalonde	Montreal Canadiens	14	23	7	30	51
Corbett Denneny	Toronto	21	20	9	29	14
Harry Cameron	Toronto	21	17	10	27	28
Didier Pitre	Montreal Canadiens	20	17	6	23	29
Eddie Gerard	Ottawa Senators	20	13	7	20	26
Jack Darragh	Ottawa Senators	18	14	5	19	26
Frank Nighbor	Ottawa Senators	10	11	8	19	6

Source: NHL

=== Leading goaltenders ===
Name	Team	GP	Mins	W	L	T	GA	SO	GAA
Georges Vezina	Canadiens	21	1282	12	9	0	84	1	3.93
Harry Holmes	Toronto	16	965	9	7	0	76	0	4.73
Clint Benedict	Ottawa	22	1337	9	13	0	114	1	5.12
Art Brooks	Toronto	4	220	2	2	0	23	0	6.27
Sammy Hebert	Toronto	2	80	1	0	0	10	0	7.50

Source: NHL

=== NHL playoff scoring leaders ===
GP = Games Played, G = Goals, A = Assists, Pts = Points

Player	Team	GP	G	A	Pts
Alf Skinner	Toronto	7	8	3	11
Newsy Lalonde	Canadiens	2	4	2	6
Harry Cameron	Toronto	7	4	0	4
Harry Meeking	Toronto	7	4	0	4
Reg Noble	Toronto	7	3	0	3

== Coaches ==
- Montreal Canadiens: Newsy Lalonde
- Montreal Wanderers: Art Ross
- Ottawa Senators: Eddie Gerard
- Toronto Arenas: Dick Carroll

== Debuts ==
The following is a list of players of note who played their first NHL game in 1917–18 (listed with their first team, not including players who previously played in the NHA):

- Jack Adams, Toronto

Of the players who kicked off their NHL career this season, Reg Noble had the longest career, retiring after the 1932–33 season.

== Last games ==
The following is a list of players of note that played their last game in the NHL in 1917–18 (listed with their last team):

- Jack Laviolette, Montreal Canadiens
- Art Ross, Montreal Wanderers
- Harry Hyland, Ottawa Senators

== See also ==
- List of Stanley Cup champions
- 1917–18 NHL transactions
- 1917–18 PCHA season

== Bibliography ==
- Coleman, Charles L. (1966). The Trail of the Stanley Cup, vol. 1, 1893–1926 inc.
- Diamond, Dan, ed. (2000). Total Hockey. Total Sports. p. 142. ISBN 1-892129-85-X.
- Dinger, Ralph, ed. (2011). The National Hockey League Official Guide & Record Book 2012. Dan Diamond & Associates. ISBN 978-1-894801-22-5.
- Dryden, Steve, ed. (2000). Century of hockey. Toronto, ON: McClelland & Stewart Ltd. ISBN 0-7710-4179-9.
- Duff, Bob (2017). The First Season: 1917–18 and the Birth of the NHL. Windsor, Ontario: Biblioasis. ISBN 978-1-771961-84-4.
- Fischler, Stan; Fischler, Shirley; Hughes, Morgan; Romain, Joseph; Duplacey, James (2003). The Hockey Chronicle: Year-by-Year History of the National Hockey League. Publications International Inc. ISBN 0-7853-9624-1.
- Holzman, Morey; Nieforth, Joseph (2002). Deceptions and Doublecross: How the NHL Conquered Hockey. Toronto, ON: Dundurn Press.
- McFarlane, Brian (1973). The Story of the National Hockey League. New York, NY: Pagurian Press. ISBN 0-684-13424-1.

Preceded by 1916–17 NHA season	1917–18 NHL season 1917–18	Succeeded by 1918–19 NHL season
