= 1916–17 NHA season =

National Hockey Association season

- League: National Hockey Association
- Sport: Ice hockey
- Duration: December 27, 1916 – March 10, 1917
- Games: 20
- Teams: 6 (4 by second half)

Regular season
- Top scorer: Joe Malone, Frank Nighbor (41)

O'Brien Cup
- Champions: Montreal Canadiens
- Runners-up: Ottawa Senators

NHA seasons
- ← 1915–16 1917–18 (NHL) →

The 1916–17 NHA season was the eighth and final season of the National Hockey Association. Six teams were to play two half-seasons of ten games each, but this was disrupted and only four teams finished the season. The Montreal Canadiens defeated the Ottawa Senators in a playoff to win the NHA championship.

The NHA franchise of the dormant Shamrocks was taken back from its owner Eddie Livingstone and used by the Toronto 228th Battalion, which had a number of NHA hockey players who had enlisted for military service. Also known as the Northern Fusiliers, the team played wearing khaki military uniforms and was the league's most popular and highest scoring club until the regiment was ordered overseas in February 1917 and the team was forced to withdraw. A scandal ensued when several stars were subsequently discharged, not having to fight and alleged they had been promised commissions solely to play hockey. The NHA would sue the 228th Battalion club for its withdrawal, though ultimately did not succeed.

A dispute also erupted over the playing schedule. After the 228th suspended play, the Toronto Blueshirts club was suspended for the rest of the season by the league, and some of its players played for other clubs for the rest of the schedule. The league intended for the players to be returned at the end of the season to whoever would own the Toronto club then. As the sale did not take place, the league kept them. The owner of the Blueshirts would file several lawsuits over the league's actions, sparking the events that led to the founding of the National Hockey League (NHL).

== League business ==
The Ottawa club wanted to suspend play for the season due to the war, but was voted down.

=== Executives ===
Emmet Quinn resigned as president on October 18, 1916.

- Frank Robinson, Montreal (president)
- Frank Calder, (secretary-treasurer)

Directors:

- S. E. Lichtenhein, Wanderers,
- G. W. Kennedy, Canadiens
- Martin Rosenthal, Ottawa
- E. J. Livingstone, Toronto
- Capt. L. W. Reade, 228th
- Mike J. Quinn, Quebec

=== Rule changes ===
A split-schedule of two halves would be used.

The single-referee system would be reinstated.

Throwing the stick to prevent a goal would mean the award of an automatic goal for the other team.

The Globe was not against the removal of Livingstone, in this editorial of February 13, 1917.

== Regular season ==
=== Suspending the Blueshirts ===
On February 10, 1917, the Blueshirts played their final game, losing 4–1 at home to Ottawa. The following day, a meeting of the NHA executive in Montreal was held to deal with the 228th Battalion leaving for overseas. Toronto proposed continuing with a five-team league, but the other owners instead voted to suspend Toronto's team. The players were dispersed by a drawing of names. The following day, President Robinson was quoted as stating that the players would return to the club after the season, but he would not guarantee that the club would be allowed to return to play, stating that would be decided at the NHA annual meeting. On February 13, Livingstone issued a statement that he was through with the NHA and that the Blueshirts franchise was available to the highest bidder. Livingstone was going to work on the opening of several arenas and a new hockey league in the United States.

=== Continuing the season ===
Ottawa, while not unhappy at the suspension of Toronto, nevertheless lost a game for the use of Cy Denneny in a game against the 228th, and saw the Wanderers and Quebec receive wins for games against the 228th. The club threatened to not play for the rest of the season. However, cooler heads prevailed and Ottawa went back to work.

The following weekend, Harry Meeking and Eddie Oatman arrived in Montreal, after being discharged by the 228th after arriving in Saint John, New Brunswick. Oatman charged that the 228th owed him $700 for his commission for his play with the 228th. As Oatman had gotten out of being drafted into the PCHA by being a member of the 228th, this set the Ottawa on again to reverse the game decision, claiming that Oatman was ineligible.

The Globe was not amused about the 228th in this editorial of February 21, 1917.

=== Livingstone lawsuits ===
On March 3, the Blueshirts were reinstated, with the instruction that the club must be sold within 60 days. On March 9, Livingstone filed lawsuits against the NHA and its clubs, seeking damages, the prevention of the other teams employing his players, forfeiture of the NHA club bonds, the declaration that his team suspension was illegal and the dissolution of the NHA, over its actions. Livingstone served one of the notices to Martin Rosenthal of the Ottawa Senators during the final game of the Montreal-Ottawa playoff. Livingstone asked Rosenthal to 'look them over when he had the chance' and Rosenthal left the envelope unopened until NHA Secretary Frank Calder called Rosenthal to ask if they had received any notices of Livingstone's legal actions. On March 18, Livingstone was granted a restraining order against the other teams to prevent the sale of the team.

Livingstone also sent a statement to newspapers claiming that the Wanderers had 'tampered' with the Toronto players by offering them employment in Montreal in the coming season for the Wanderers. Wanderers' president Sam Lichtenheim challenged Livingstone to come up with proof or he would seek libel charges against Livingstone.

=== Final standings ===
National Hockey Association
First Half	GP	W	L	T	GF	GA
Montreal Canadiens	10	7	3	0	58	38
Ottawa Senators	10	7	3	0	56	41
Toronto 228th Battalion	10	6	4	0	70	57
Toronto Hockey Club	10	5	5	0	50	45
Montreal Wanderers	10	3	7	0	56	72
Quebec Bulldogs	10	2	8	0	43	80

Second Half	GP	W	L	T	GF	GA
Ottawa Senators	10	8	2	0	63	22
Quebec Bulldogs	10	8	2	0	54	46
Montreal Canadiens	10	3	7	0	31	42
Montreal Wanderers	10	2	8	0	38	65

Note: W = Wins, L = Losses, T = Ties, GF= Goals For, GA = Goals Against
After the 228th Battalion dropped out, and Toronto suspended, the schedule was revised so that the remaining teams would play a 20 game schedule of two halves containing 10 games each. Some of the games to that point were moved into the second half. The 'second half' standings therefore include some games that the 228th and Toronto played.

=== Results ===
First half

Month	Day	Visitor	Score	Home	Score
Dec.	27	Ottawa	7	228th	10
Dec.	27	Wanderers	2	Quebec	6
Dec.	27	Toronto	7	Canadiens	1
Dec.	30	Canadiens	1	Ottawa	7
Dec.	30	Quebec	5	Toronto	8
Dec.	30	228th	10	Wanderers	4
Jan.	3	Ottawa	10	Wanderers	5
Jan.	3	Canadiens	4	Quebec	2
Jan.	3	228th	4	Toronto	0
Jan.	6	Toronto	2	Ottawa	3
Jan.	6	Wanderers	4	Canadiens	9
Jan.	6	Quebec	9	228th	16
Jan.	10	Ottawa	4	Quebec	5
Jan.	10	228th	1	Canadiens	6
Jan.	10	Wanderers	4	Toronto	9
Jan.	13	228th	1	Ottawa	2
Jan.	13	Canadiens	6	Toronto	2
Jan.	13	Quebec	3	Wanderers	12
Jan.	17	Ottawa	3	Canadiens	2
Jan.	17	Wanderers	10	228th	4
Jan.	17	Toronto	5	Quebec	1
Jan.	20	Wanderers	5	Ottawa	8
Jan.	20	Toronto	6	228th	8
Jan.	20	Quebec	6	Canadiens	10
Jan.	24	Ottawa	5	Toronto	8
Jan.	24	228th	12	Quebec	4
Jan.	24	Canadiens	10	Wanderers	2
Jan.	27	Quebec	2	Ottawa	7
Jan.	27	Toronto	3	Wanderers	8
Jan.	27	Canadiens	9	228th	4

Second half

Month	Day	Visitor	Score	Home	Score
Jan.	31	228th	0	Ottawa ‡	8
Jan.	31	Quebec	4	Wanderers	3 (OT 3'25")
Jan.	31	Canadiens	2	Toronto	6
Feb.	3	Ottawa	2	Canadiens	1
Feb.	3	Toronto	3	Quebec	7 (2' to play)
Feb.	3	Wanderers †		228th	(postponed)
Feb.	7	Wanderers	5	Ottawa	8
Feb.	7	Toronto	4	228th	3
Feb.	7	Quebec	3	Canadiens	6
Feb.	10	Ottawa	4	Toronto	1
Feb.	10	Canadiens	6	Wanderers	3
Feb.	12	228th		Quebec	(cancelled)
Feb.	14	Canadiens	1	Ottawa	4
Feb.	14	Quebec	7	Wanderers	3
Feb.	17	Wanderers	3	Canadiens	4
Feb.	17	Ottawa	2	Quebec	3 (OT 16')
Feb.	21	Canadiens	1	Quebec	5
Feb.	21	Ottawa	5	Wanderers	3
Feb.	24	Quebec	7	Canadiens	6 (OT 17'50")
Feb.	24	Wanderers	6	Ottawa	11
Feb.	28	Ottawa	3	Canadiens	1
Feb.	28	Wanderers	6	Quebec	17
Mar.	3	Quebec	1	Ottawa	16
Mar.	3	Canadiens	3	Wanderers	6

‡ Ottawa lost game on use of ineligible Cy Denneny.
† Wanderers given win for this game in revised second half.
& Quebec given win for this game in revised second half.
* 228th was ordered overseas. Toronto club was suspended by league.

== Player statistics ==
=== Scoring leaders ===
Note: GP = Games played, G = Goals scored, A = Assists, Pts = Points, PIM = Penalties in minutes

Name	Club	GP	G	A	Pts	PIM
Frank Nighbor	Ottawa	19	41	10	51	24
Joe Malone	Quebec	19	41	8	49	15
Newsy Lalonde	Canadiens	18	28	7	35	61
Odie Cleghorn	Wanderers	18	28	4	32	49
Jack Darragh	Ottawa	20	24	4	28	17
Didier Pitre	Canadiens	20	21	6	27	50
Dave Ritchie	Quebec	19	17	10	27	20
Eddie Gerard	Ottawa	19	17	9	26	37
Eddie Oatman	228th	12	17	5	22	20
Corb Denneny	Ottawa; Blueshirts	20	19	2	21	35

=== Goaltending averages ===
Note: GP = Games played, GA = Goals against, SO = Shutouts, GAA = Goals against average

Name	Club	GP	GA	SO	GAA
Gordon Keats	Toronto	2	5		2.5
Clint Benedict	Ottawa	18	50	1	2.8
Georges Vezina	Canadiens	20	80		4.0
Art Brooks	Toronto	4	16	1	4.0
Billy Nicholson	Toronto	10	40	1	4.0
Ossie Lang	Ottawa	1	5		5.0
Sammy Hebert	Quebec/Ottawa	15	84		5.6
Howard Lockhart	228th Battalion	12	69	1	5.8 †
Bert Lindsay	Wanderers	15	96		6.4
Paddy Moran	Quebec	6	50		8.3
Billy Hague	Wanderers	4	41		10.3

† Totals includes two 228th Battalion games played in second half, not counted in standings.

== Playoff ==
Montreal qualified for the two-game total-goal playoff by winning the first half of the schedule. Ottawa defeated Quebec 16–1 in the final game of the schedule to take the second half title on the basis of goals, as both teams finished with 8–2 records for the second half.

In the first game, held in Montreal, Bert Corbeau scored in the first to put Montreal ahead. The teams traded goals in the second period on goals by Frank Nighbor of Ottawa and Didier Pitre of Montreal. Eddie Gerard scored early in the third for Ottawa to tie the game again, but former Quebec player Tommy Smith scored 20 seconds later to put Montreal back in the lead. Montreal's Pitre and Newsy Lalonde then scored in the next three minutes to clinch the game for Montreal. Nighbor was knocked out by Smith in the second period and he remained out until the third period. He was knocked out again after Smith's goal but returned after the Canadiens had taken their three-goal lead. Nighbor was slashed across the face by Lalonde with one minute to go and was carried off for the third time. It was Lalonde's second match foul of the season and he was suspended for the second match of the playoff.

In the second game, held in Ottawa before 7,500 fans, Nighbor played despite the injuries of the first playoff game. Jack Darragh of Ottawa scored a power-play goal to open the scoring in the first period. Darragh broke in on a breakaway but was driven wide by Montreal's goaltender Georges Vezina. Darragh then shot the puck out front of the net off a Canadiens' player and into the net. In the second, Bert Corbeau scored to put Montreal two goals ahead on the playoff. George Boucher scored before the second period ended to bring Ottawa back within a goal. In the third, Cy Denneny replaced Eddie Gerard and from a pass by Nighbor scored on Vezina to tie the playoff. With three minutes to play, Nighbor and Darragh broke in on Vezina, who stopped the shot and passed it out to Reg Noble. Noble brought it to the Ottawa line and shot it wide of the net. Ottawa goaltender Clint Benedict then set up the puck for an Ottawa player to pick up, but it was instead taken by Montreal's Smith. Benedict attempted to clear the puck, but Smith was able to poke it into the net to put Montreal ahead again to stay on the playoff.

Date	Winning Team	Score	Losing Team	Location
March 7	Montreal Canadiens	5–2	Ottawa Senators	Montreal Arena
March 10	Ottawa Senators	4–2	Montreal Canadiens	The Arena, Ottawa
Canadiens win two-game total-goals playoff 7–6

The Montreal Canadiens won the O'Brien Cup, but lost to the Seattle Metropolitans of the PCHA in the Stanley Cup Final.

== See also ==
- National Hockey Association
- List of pre-NHL seasons
- List of Stanley Cup champions

Preceded by 1915–16 NHA season	NHA seasons 1916–17	Succeeded by 1917–18 NHL season
