= Jubilee Arena =

Indoor arena in Montreal, Quebec

Coordinates: 45.537798°N 73.542223°W

- Jubilee rink
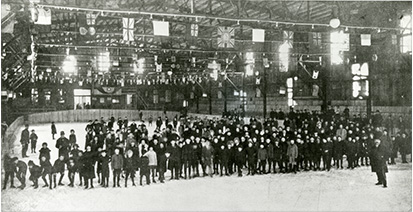
- Interactive map of Jubilee Arena
- Location: rue St. Catherine Est and rue Alphonse-D. Roy Street (then rue Malborough), Montreal
- Owner: P. J. Doran
- Capacity: 3,200
- Surface: natural ice

Construction
- Groundbreaking: 1908
- Built: 1909
- Closed: 1919
- Demolished: 1919 by fire

Tenants
- Montreal Canadiens (NHA, NHL); 1909–1910, 1918–1919; Montreal Wanderers (NHA); 1909–1911

The Jubilee Arena also known as Jubilee Rink and l'Aréna Jubilee was an indoor arena located in Montreal, Quebec, Canada. It was located at the area bounded by rue Alphonse-D. Roy Street (then known as rue Malborough) and rue Ste. Catherine Est. If you start at the intersection of Saint-Catherine E and rue Omer-Ravary (formerly rue Beauport), the former site of the arena is in the parking lot across the street. It was used for games of the Montreal Canadiens hockey club of the National Hockey Association (NHA) and National Hockey League (NHL) from 1909 to 1910 and again in 1919, and it was home of the Montreal Wanderers NHA club for one year in 1910. It was originally built in 1908 and held seating for 3,200 spectators.

Ownership of the Jubilee Rink played a significant role in the 1909 formation of the NHA. In November 1909, the owner of the Eastern Canada Hockey Association (ECHA) Wanderers club announced he would move the team to the Jubilee, which he also owned. As it was smaller than the Montreal Arena, and the other three members of the ECHA would earn less revenues when playing there, these owners dissolved the ECHA, formed the Canadian Hockey Association (CHA) and invited applications from other teams. At a meeting on November 25, the CHA rejected the application of the Wanderers, represented at the meeting by player Jimmy Gardner, as well as the application of Ambrose O'Brien's Renfrew Creamery Kings. Before leaving the building, Gardner and O'Brien decided to form the NHA, which was finalized on December 2. Poor ticket sales collapsed the CHA eight weeks after it was formed, and the popular ECHA/CHA Ottawa Hockey Club (reigning Stanley Cup champion) and Montreal Shamrocks immediately joined the seven-week-old NHA.

In 1918, when the Montreal Arena burned down, the Canadiens moved into Jubilee Arena on a full-time basis. On the afternoon of April 23, 1919, Jubilee Arena also burned down, forcing the Habs to build and move into the Mount Royal Arena which opened in 1920.

== See also ==
- National Hockey League
- Victoria Skating Rink

Preceded by none	Home of the Montreal Canadiens; 1909–1910	Succeeded by Montreal Arena
Preceded by Montreal Arena	Home of the Montreal Wanderers; 1909–1910	Succeeded by Montreal Arena
Preceded by Montreal Arena	Home of the Montreal Canadiens; 1918–1919	Succeeded by Mount Royal Arena
