= Montreal Arena =

Building in Montreal

Coordinates: 45.487629°N 73.586651°W

- Westmount Arena
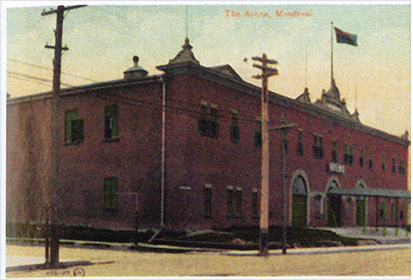
- Interactive map of Montreal Arena
- Location: St. Catherine Street and Wood Avenue, Westmount
- Owner: Canadian Arena Company
- Capacity: 4,300; 10,000 (temporary)
- Surface: Natural ice (1898); Artificial (1915)

Construction
- Groundbreaking: 1898; 128 years ago
- Opened: December 31, 1898; 127 years ago
- Closed: 1918; 108 years ago
- Demolished: 1918; 108 years ago

Tenants
- Montreal Canadiens (NHA, NHL) (1911–1918); Montreal Wanderers (NHA, NHL) (1904–1909, 1911–1918)

The Montreal Arena, also known as Westmount Arena, was an indoor arena located in Westmount, Quebec, Canada on the corner of St. Catherine Street and Wood Avenue. It is considered the first arena designed expressly for ice hockey. Opened in 1898, it was the primary site of amateur and professional ice hockey in Montreal until 1918.

== Description ==
Opened on December 31, 1898, it held 10,000 people, 4,300 seated. It held a refreshment buffet and smoking rooms, with rugs available for rental to sit on. It is likely the first arena designed expressly for ice hockey, although it was built after the St. Nicholas Rink in New York City, and the Dey's Skating Rink in Ottawa, which both opened in 1896. These popular recreational skating venues also supported ice hockey leagues.

The ice rink ends were not squared off but rounded off. The ends were somewhat semi-circular, possibly the first design of its kind. A puck could be shot along the outside rim, slide along the corners, pass behind the goal and come out the other side. That type of shot is common in hockey today and is called "rimmed around." The rounded-corners design spread to other arenas. In 1902, after the Dey Rink was demolished due to a storm, it was rebuilt with rounded ends to match the Montreal Arena. The fence along the ice surface was increased in height to 4 feet (1.2 m), an increase from the Victoria Skating Rink's one foot high boards. The first artificial ice-making plant in Montreal was installed in the Arena in 1915.

The owners of the Montreal Arena, the Canadian Arena Company, later built the Arena Gardens in Toronto, and operated the Toronto Arenas in 1917–18. Principals of the Arena Company, such as William Northey, would later be involved in the building of the Montreal Forum and the founding of the Montreal Maroons.

The Montreal Canadiens won their first (pre-NHL) Stanley Cup in this building on March 30, 1916, against the Portland Rosebuds.

Many other great teams played there and won Cups before then, including the Montreal Victorias in 1899, the Montreal Shamrocks in 1899 and 1900, the Montreal Hockey Club in 1903, and the Montreal Wanderers who started playing there in 1904 and won the Stanley Cup there in 1906 (winning goal in aggregate series scored at Montreal Arena), 1907, and 1908.

Within the one block distance from the Montreal Forum (17 Cups incl 13 by Habs, 2 by Maroons, CGY and NYR) to the Montreal Arena (8 Cups), 25 total Cups were won all told.

=== Fire ===
A fire started in the ice-making plant causing the arena to burn down on January 2, 1918. It began mid-day, when the only people in the building were the superintendent James McKeene and his family, who were eating in their apartment on the north side of the structure; all escaped safely but they lost most of their belongings, as well as a car stored in the annex. Damage was estimated at $150,000, including the uniforms and sticks of the Wanderers and Canadiens, with only a third covered by insurance. The blaze led the Montreal Wanderers, already on shaky grounds, to disband within days and the Canadiens to move back to Jubilee Arena, which itself would be destroyed by fire, the next year. In 1924, the new Montreal Forum was built one block to the east.

=== Today ===
A condominium building currently sits on the site. Previously a warehouse had been on the site after the fire that destroyed the arena.

== Usage ==
At first, it hosted the Montreal senior men's amateur hockey teams of the Amateur Hockey Association of Canada, including the Montreal, Shamrock and Victoria hockey clubs. The Wanderers would start play there in 1904. Later, it served as the home rink for the Montreal Canadiens of the National Hockey Association and National Hockey League (NHL) from 1911 until 1918.

In 1907, it was the site of one of hockey's first player brawls. On January 12, 1907, the game between the heated rivals Ottawa Hockey Club and the Montreal Wanderers degenerated into a free for all. Ottawa players Charles Spittal, Alf Smith and Harry Smith each knocked out a Montreal player cold and received game misconducts. Cecil Blachford, Ernest Johnson and Hod Stuart all required hospital treatment. Despite the injuries, the Wanderers won the game 4–2. The ECAHA convened a week later to consider discipline for the Ottawa players and when no agreement was found, league president McRobie resigned. When Ottawa returned for a January 26 against the Montreal Victorias, Spittal and the Smiths were arrested for assault, each eventually paying $20 fines.

The first NHL game in the Arena was played on December 19, 1917, with the Wanderers earning a 10–9 win over the newly established Toronto Arenas. It may be the NHL's first game. According to a French language newspaper ad re-discovered in 2017, the Montreal game was scheduled for 8:15 pm, ahead of another game that same night in Ottawa between the Senators and Canadiens which was scheduled for 8:30 pm. The actual start time of games was not recorded at that point in the NHL's history, however. Wanderers defenceman Dave Ritchie scored the league's likely first goal early in the game. The NHL held its 100th anniversary game in December 2017 in Ottawa between the Senators and Canadiens, played outdoors.

The building was also used for exhibition space. Horse shows, car shows, motor-boat displays, concerts, and bazaars were held. New York's Metropolitan Opera performed at the arena, as well as singers such as Melba, Caruso, Calve and Albani.

== Gallery ==
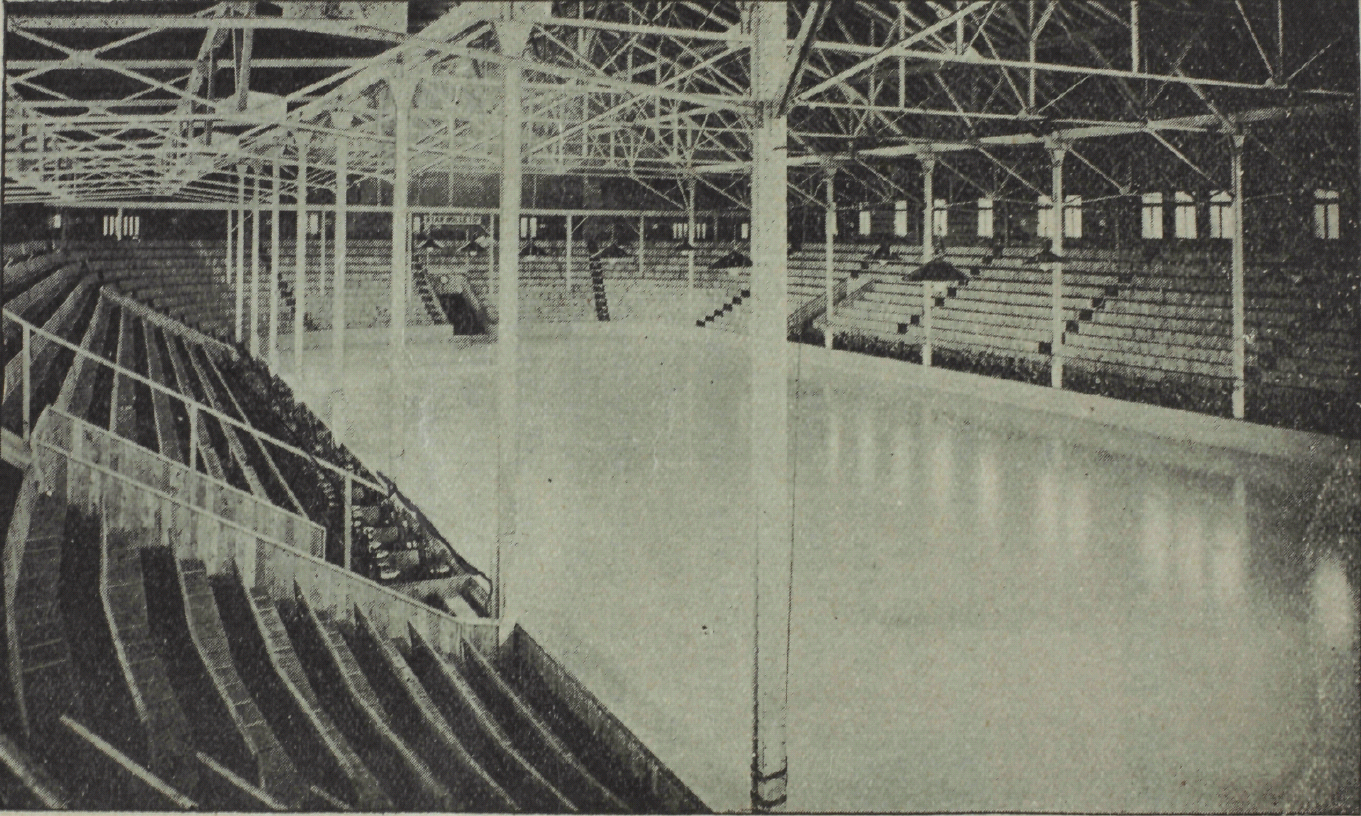
Interior

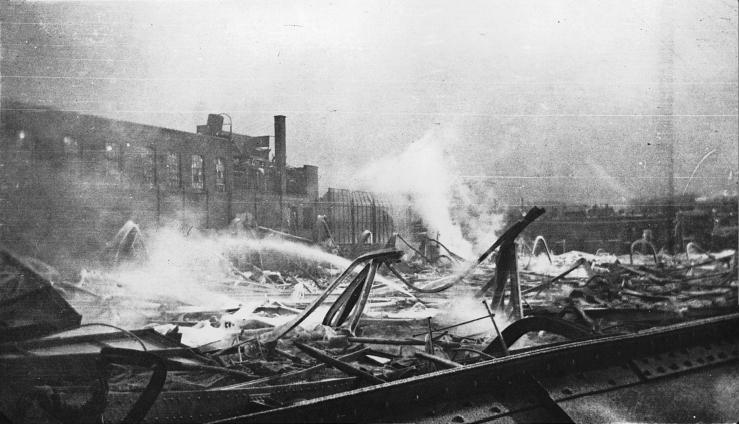
Ruins of Montreal Arena

== See also ==
- William Northey

Preceded by Jubilee Arena	Home of the Montreal Canadiens; 1911–1918	Succeeded by Jubilee Arena
Preceded by first arena	Home of the Montreal Wanderers; 1904–1909	Succeeded by Jubilee Arena
Preceded by Jubilee Arena	Home of the Montreal Wanderers; 1911–1918	Succeeded by last arena
