= List of Toronto Maple Leafs seasons =

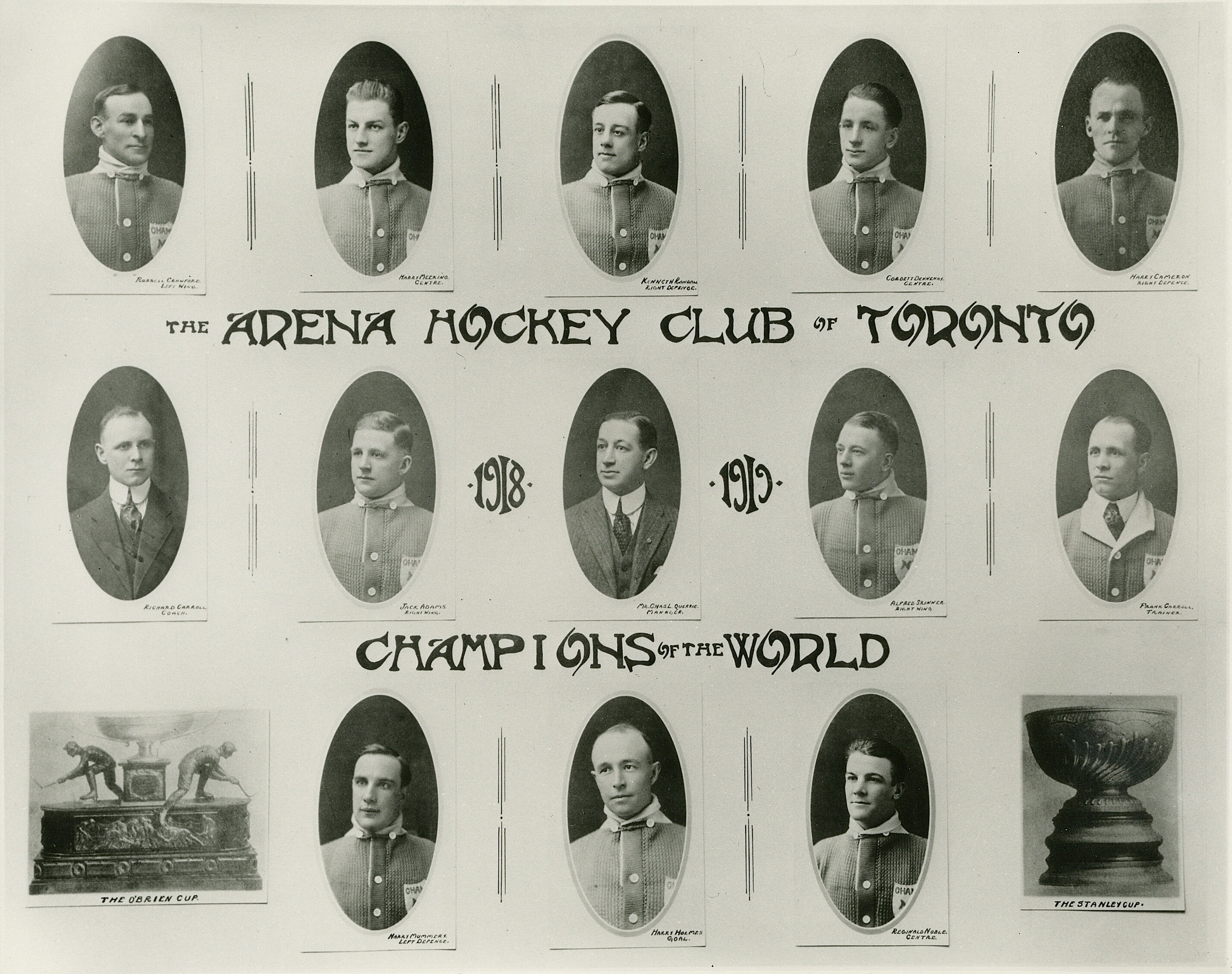
1917–18 season Toronto Arenas. Top row, from left: Rusty Crawford, Harry Meeking, Ken Randall, Corbett Denneny, Harry Cameron. Middle row, from left: Dick Carroll, Jack Adams, Charles Querrie, Alf Skinner, Frank Carroll. Bottom row, from left: Harry Mummery, Harry "Hap" Holmes, Reg Noble.

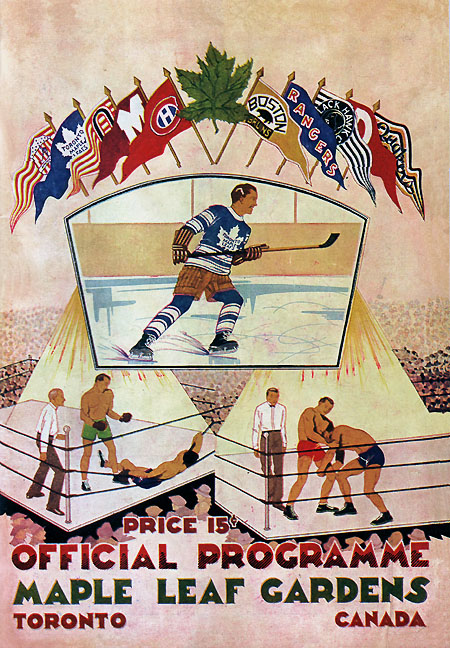
Toronto Maple Leafs opening night program at Maple Leaf Gardens, November 12, 1931.

The Toronto Maple Leafs are a professional ice hockey team based in Toronto. They are members of the Atlantic Division in the Eastern Conference of the National Hockey League (NHL) and are known as one of the Original Six teams of the league. Founded in 1917, the club had no nickname in their first season, and were known as the Toronto Arenas for their second season. From the 1919–20 season they were known as the Toronto St. Patricks, until in February 1927 when the club was purchased by Conn Smythe. Smythe changed the name of the club to the Maple Leafs and they have been known by that name ever since. Over their 107 seasons, the Leafs have won over 3,200 regular season games, lost over 2,900 regular season games, accumulated seven division championships, led the league in points six times, appeared in the playoffs 73 times, gained eight O'Brien Cup championships, and won 13 Stanley Cup titles.

== Table key ==
Key of colors and symbols
Color/symbol	Explanation
†	Stanley Cup champions
‡	Conference champions
§	O'Brien Cup champions
↑	Division champions
#	Led league in points

Key of terms and abbreviations
Term or abbreviation	Definition
Finish	Final position in division or league standings
GP	Number of games played
W	Number of wins
L	Number of losses
T	Number of ties
OT	Number of losses in overtime (since the 1999–2000 season)
Pts	Number of points
GF	Goals for (goals scored by the Maple Leafs)
GA	Goals against (goals scored by the Maple Leafs' opponents)
—	Does not apply
TG	Two-game total goals series

== Year by year ==
Season	Maple Leafs season	Conference	Division	Regular season									Postseason						
Season	Maple Leafs season	Conference	Division	Finish	GP	W	L	T	OT	Pts	GF	GA	GP	W	L	T	GF	GA	Result
Toronto Arenas
1917–18 (Note: From the 1917–18 season to the 1920–21 season, the NHL played a split season schedule. The winners of each half faced each other in a two-game, total-goals series for the NHL championship.)	1917–18 (Note: For the 1917–18 season, the club had no official nickname.)	—	— (Note: From the 1917–18 season to the 1925–26 season, the NHL had no divisions.)	2nd§ (Note: From the 1917–18 season to the 1926–27 season, the O'Brien Cup was awarded to the postseason champion of the NHL.)	14	8	6	—	—	16	71	75	7	4	3	0	28	28	Won in NHL Finals, 10–7 (TG) (Canadiens); Won in Stanley Cup Final, 3–2 (Millionaires)†
1917–18	1917–18	—	—	1st§	8	5	3	—	—	10#	37	34	7	4	3	0	28	28	Won in NHL Finals, 10–7 (TG) (Canadiens); Won in Stanley Cup Final, 3–2 (Millionaires)†
1918–19	1918–19 (Note: For the 1918–19 season, the club was known as the Arenas.)	—	—	3rd	10	3	7	—	—	6	43	49	—	—	—	—	—	—	Did not qualify
1918–19	1918–19	—	—	3rd	8	2	6	—	—	4	22	43	—	—	—	—	—	—	Did not qualify
Toronto St. Patricks
1919–20	1919–20 (Note: From the 1919–20 season until February 1927, the club was known as the St. Patricks.)	—	—	3rd	12	5	7	—	—	10	52	62	—	—	—	—	—	—	Did not qualify
1919–20	1919–20	—	—	2nd	12	7	5	—	—	14	67	44	—	—	—	—	—	—	Did not qualify
1920–21	1920–21	—	—	2nd	10	5	5	—	—	10	39	47	2	0	2	0	0	7	Lost in NHL Finals, 0–7 (TG) (Senators)
1920–21	1920–21	—	—	1st	14	10	4	—	—	20#	66	53	2	0	2	0	0	7	Lost in NHL Finals, 0–7 (TG) (Senators)
1921–22	1921–22	—	—	2nd§	24	13	10	1 (Note: Beginning in the 1921–22 NHL season, the NHL adopted a new rule stipulating that only a single overtime period would be played to break ties, with both teams receiving one point in games that remained tied.)	—	27	98	97	7	4	2	1	21	13	Won in NHL Finals, 5–4 (TG) (Senators); Won in Stanley Cup Final, 3–2 (Millionaires)†
1922–23	1922–23	—	—	3rd	24	13	10	1	—	27	82	88	—	—	—	—	—	—	Did not qualify
1923–24	1923–24	—	—	3rd	24	10	14	0	—	20	59	85	—	—	—	—	—	—	Did not qualify
1924–25	1924–25	—	—	2nd	30	19	11	0	—	38	90	84	2	0	2	0	2	5	Lost in NHL semifinals, 2–5 (TG) (Canadiens)
1925–26	1925–26	—	—	6th	36	12	21	3	—	27	92	114	—	—	—	—	—	—	Did not qualify
1926–27	1926–27	—	Canadian (Note: From the 1926–27 season to the 1937–38 season, the Maple Leafs played in the Canadian Division.)	5th	44	15	24	5	—	35	79	94	—	—	—	—	—	—	Did not qualify
Toronto Maple Leafs (Note: In February 1927, Conn Smythe, changed the team name to the Maple Leafs. The team played for the rest of the season as the Maple Leafs and has used that name ever since.)
1927–28	1927–28	—	Canadian	4th	44	18	18	8	—	44	89	88	—	—	—	—	—	—	Did not qualify
1928–29	1928–29	—	Canadian	3rd	44	21	18	5	—	47	85	69	4	2	2	0	8	5	Won in quarterfinals, 7–2 (TG) (Cougars); Lost in semifinals, 0–2 (Rangers)
1929–30	1929–30	—	Canadian	4th	44	17	21	6	—	40	116	124	—	—	—	—	—	—	Did not qualify
1930–31	1930–31	—	Canadian	2nd	44	22	13	9	—	53	118	99	2	0	1	1	3	4	Lost in quarterfinals, 3–4 (TG) (Black Hawks)
1931–32	1931–32	—	Canadian	2nd	48	23	18	7	—	53	155	127	7	5	1	1	28	15	Won in quarterfinals, 6–2 (TG) (Black Hawks); Won in semifinals, 4–3 (TG) (Maroons); Won in Stanley Cup Final, 3–0 (Rangers)†
1932–33	1932–33	—	Canadian↑	1st§ (Note: From the 1927–28 season to the 1937–38 season, the O'Brien Cup was awarded to the champion of the Canadian Division.)	48	24	18	6	—	54	119	111	9	4	5	0	14	18	Won in semifinals, 3–2 (Bruins); Lost in Stanley Cup Final, 1–3 (Rangers)
1933–34	1933–34	—	Canadian↑	1st§	48	26	13	9	—	61#	174	119	5	2	3	0	12	11	Lost in semifinals, 2–3 (Red Wings)
1934–35	1934–35	—	Canadian↑	1st§	48	30	14	4	—	64#	157	111	7	3	4	0	11	12	Won in semifinals, 3–1 (Bruins); Lost in Stanley Cup Final, 0–3 (Maroons)
1935–36	1935–36	—	Canadian	2nd	48	23	19	6	—	52	126	106	9	4	5	0	25	27	Won in quarterfinals, 8–6 (TG) (Bruins); Won in semifinals, 2–1 (Americans); Lost in Stanley Cup Final, 1–3 (Red Wings)
1936–37	1936–37	—	Canadian	3rd	48	22	21	5	—	49	119	115	2	0	2	0	1	5	Lost in quarterfinals, 0–2 (Rangers)
1937–38	1937–38	—	Canadian↑	1st§	48	24	15	9	—	57	151	127	7	4	3	0	14	13	Won in semifinals, 3–0 (Bruins); Lost in Stanley Cup Final, 1–3 (Black Hawks)
1938–39	1938–39	—	— (Note: From the 1938–39 season to the 1966–67 season, the NHL had no divisions.)	3rd§ (Note: From the 1938–39 season to the 1949–50 season, the O'Brien Cup was awarded to the NHL playoff runner-up, and was retired after the 1949–50 season.)	48	19	20	9	—	47	114	107	10	5	5	0	22	20	Won in quarterfinals, 2–0 (Americans); Won in semifinals, 2–1 (Red Wings); Lost in Stanley Cup Final, 1–4 (Bruins)
1939–40	1939–40	—	—	3rd§	48	25	17	6	—	56	134	110	10	6	4	0	21	19	Won in quarterfinals, 2–0 (Black Hawks); Won in semifinals, 2–0 (Red Wings); Lost in Stanley Cup Final, 2–4 (Rangers)
1940–41	1940–41	—	—	2nd	48	28	14	6	—	62	145	99	7	3	4	0	17	15	Lost in semifinals, 3–4 (Bruins)
1941–42	1941–42	—	—	2nd	48	27	18	3	—	57	158	136	13	8	5	0	38	31	Won in semifinals, 4–2 (Rangers); Won in Stanley Cup Final, 4–3 (Red Wings)†
1942–43	1942–43	—	—	3rd	50	22	19	9	—	53	198	159	6	2	4	0	17	20	Lost in semifinals, 2–4 (Red Wings)
1943–44	1943–44	—	—	3rd	50	23	23	4	—	50	214	174	5	1	4	0	6	23	Lost in semifinals, 1–4 (Canadiens)
1944–45	1944–45	—	—	3rd	50	24	22	4	—	52	183	161	13	8	5	0	24	30	Won in semifinals, 4–2 (Canadiens); Won in Stanley Cup Final, 4–3 (Red Wings)†
1945–46	1945–46	—	—	5th	50	19	24	7	—	45	174	185	—	—	—	—	—	—	Did not qualify
1946–47	1946–47	—	—	2nd	60	31	19	10	—	72	209	172	11	8	3	0	31	27	Won in semifinals, 4–1 (Red Wings); Won in Stanley Cup Final, 4–2 (Canadiens)†
1947–48	1947–48	—	—	1st	60	32	15	13	—	77#	182	143	9	8	1	0	38	20	Won in semifinals, 4–1 (Bruins); Won in Stanley Cup Final, 4–0 (Red Wings)†
1948–49	1948–49	—	—	4th	60	22	25	13	—	57	147	161	9	8	1	0	28	15	Won in semifinals, 4–1 (Bruins); Won in Stanley Cup Final, 4–0 (Red Wings)†
1949–50	1949–50	—	—	3rd	70	31	27	12	—	74	176	173	7	3	4	0	11	10	Lost in semifinals, 3–4 (Red Wings)
1950–51	1950–51	—	—	2nd	70	41	16	13	—	95	212	138	11	8	2	1	30	15	Won in semifinals, 4–1–1 (Bruins) (Note: Toronto won the series with Boston 4 games to 1, however 6 games were played with the second ending in a tie. The game was called after one overtime period due to a Lord's Day curfew law.); Won in Stanley Cup Final, 4–1 (Canadiens)†
1951–52	1951–52	—	—	3rd	70	29	25	16	—	74	168	157	4	0	4	—	3	13	Lost in semifinals, 0–4 (Red Wings)
1952–53	1952–53	—	—	5th	70	27	30	13	—	67	156	167	—	—	—	—	—	—	Did not qualify
1953–54	1953–54	—	—	3rd	70	32	24	14	—	78	152	131	5	1	4	—	8	15	Lost in semifinals, 1–4 (Red Wings)
1954–55	1954–55	—	—	3rd	70	24	24	22	—	70	147	135	4	0	4	—	6	14	Lost in semifinals, 0–4 (Red Wings)
1955–56	1955–56	—	—	4th	70	24	33	13	—	61	153	181	5	1	4	—	10	14	Lost in semifinals, 1–4 (Red Wings)
1956–57	1956–57	—	—	5th	70	21	34	15	—	57	174	192	—	—	—	—	—	—	Did not qualify
1957–58	1957–58	—	—	6th	70	21	38	11	—	53	192	226	—	—	—	—	—	—	Did not qualify
1958–59	1958–59	—	—	4th	70	27	32	11	—	65	189	201	12	5	7	—	32	39	Won in semifinals, 4–3 (Bruins); Lost in Stanley Cup Final, 1–4 (Canadiens)
1959–60	1959–60	—	—	2nd	70	35	26	9	—	79	199	195	10	4	6	—	25	31	Won in semifinals, 4–2 (Red Wings); Lost in Stanley Cup Final, 0–4 (Canadiens)
1960–61	1960–61	—	—	2nd	70	39	19	12	—	90	234	176	5	1	4	—	8	15	Lost in semifinals, 1–4 (Red Wings)
1961–62	1961–62	—	—	2nd	70	37	22	11	—	85	232	180	12	8	4	—	40	30	Won in semifinals, 4–2 (Rangers); Won in Stanley Cup Final, 4–2 (Black Hawks)†
1962–63	1962–63	—	—	1st	70	35	23	12	—	82#	221	180	10	8	2	—	31	16	Won in semifinals, 4–1 (Canadiens); Won in Stanley Cup Final, 4–1 (Red Wings)†
1963–64	1963–64	—	—	3rd	70	33	25	12	—	78	192	172	14	8	6	—	39	31	Won in semifinals, 4–3 (Canadiens); Won in Stanley Cup Final, 4–3 (Red Wings)†
1964–65	1964–65	—	—	4th	70	30	26	14	—	74	204	173	6	2	4	—	14	17	Lost in semifinals, 2–4 (Canadiens)
1965–66	1965–66	—	—	3rd	70	34	25	11	—	79	208	187	4	0	4	—	6	15	Lost in semifinals, 0–4 (Canadiens)
1966–67	1966–67	—	—	3rd	70	32	27	11	—	75	204	211	12	8	4	—	35	30	Won in semifinals, 4–2 (Black Hawks); Won in Stanley Cup Final, 4–2 (Canadiens)†
1967–68	1967–68	—	East (Note: Before the 1967–68 season, the NHL split into East and West Divisions because of the addition of six expansion teams.)	5th	74	33	31	10	—	76	209	176	—	—	—	—	—	—	Did not qualify
1968–69	1968–69	—	East	4th	76	35	26	15	—	85	234	217	4	0	4	—	5	24	Lost in quarterfinals, 0–4 (Bruins)
1969–70	1969–70	—	East	6th	76	29	34	13	—	71	222	242	—	—	—	—	—	—	Did not qualify
1970–71	1970–71	—	East	4th	78	37	33	8	—	82	248	211	6	2	4	—	15	16	Lost in quarterfinals, 2–4 (Rangers)
1971–72	1971–72	—	East	4th	78	33	31	14	—	80	209	208	5	1	4	—	10	18	Lost in quarterfinals, 1–4 (Bruins)
1972–73	1972–73	—	East	6th	78	27	41	10	—	64	247	279	—	—	—	—	—	—	Did not qualify
1973–74	1973–74	—	East	4th	78	35	27	16	—	86	274	230	4	0	4	—	9	17	Lost in quarterfinals, 0–4 (Bruins)
1974–75	1974–75	Wales (Note: The NHL realigned before the 1974–75 season. The Maple Leafs were placed in the Adams Division of the Prince of Wales Conference.)	Adams	3rd	80	31	33	16	—	78	280	309	7	2	5	—	13	21	Won in preliminary round, 2–1 (Kings); Lost in quarterfinals, 0–4 (Flyers)
1975–76	1975–76	Wales	Adams	3rd	80	34	31	15	—	83	294	276	10	5	5	—	31	36	Won in preliminary round, 2–1 (Penguins); Lost in quarterfinals, 3–4 (Flyers)
1976–77	1976–77	Wales	Adams	3rd	80	33	32	15	—	81	301	285	9	4	5	—	31	29	Won in preliminary round, 2–1 (Penguins); Lost in quarterfinals, 2–4 (Flyers)
1977–78	1977–78	Wales	Adams	3rd	80	41	29	10	—	92	271	237	13	6	7	—	33	32	Won in preliminary round, 2–0 (Kings); Won in quarterfinals, 4–3 (Islanders); Lost in semifinals, 0–4 (Canadiens)
1978–79	1978–79	Wales	Adams	3rd	80	34	33	13	—	81	267	252	6	2	4	—	19	24	Won in preliminary round, 2–0 (Flames); Lost in quarterfinals, 0–4 (Canadiens)
1979–80	1979–80	Wales	Adams	4th	80	35	40	5	—	75	304	327	3	0	3	—	8	17	Lost in preliminary round, 0–3 (North Stars)
1980–81	1980–81	Wales	Adams	5th	80	28	37	15	—	71	322	367	3	0	3	—	9	15	Lost in preliminary round, 0–3 (Islanders)
1981–82	1981–82	Campbell (Note: The NHL realigned before the 1981–82 season. The Maple Leafs were placed in the Norris Division of the Clarence Campbell Conference.)	Norris	5th	80	20	44	16	—	56	298	380	—	—	—	—	—	—	Did not qualify
1982–83	1982–83	Campbell	Norris	3rd	80	28	40	12	—	68	293	330	4	1	3	—	18	18	Lost in division semifinals, 1–3 (North Stars)
1983–84	1983–84	Campbell	Norris	5th	80	26	45	9	—	61	303	387	—	—	—	—	—	—	Did not qualify
1984–85	1984–85	Campbell	Norris	5th	80	20	52	8	—	48	253	358	—	—	—	—	—	—	Did not qualify
1985–86	1985–86	Campbell	Norris	4th	80	25	48	7	—	57	311	386	10	6	4	—	40	33	Won in division semifinals, 3–0 (Black Hawks); Lost in division finals, 3–4 (Blues)
1986–87	1986–87	Campbell	Norris	4th	80	32	42	6	—	70	286	319	13	7	6	—	33	32	Won in division semifinals, 4–2 (Blues); Lost in division finals, 3–4 (Red Wings)
1987–88	1987–88	Campbell	Norris	4th	80	21	49	10	—	52	273	345	6	2	4	—	20	32	Lost in division semifinals, 2–4 (Red Wings)
1988–89	1988–89	Campbell	Norris	5th	80	28	46	6	—	62	259	342	—	—	—	—	—	—	Did not qualify
1989–90	1989–90	Campbell	Norris	3rd	80	38	38	4	—	80	337	358	5	1	4	—	16	20	Lost in division semifinals, 1–4 (Blues)
1990–91	1990–91	Campbell	Norris	5th	80	23	46	11	—	57	241	318	—	—	—	—	—	—	Did not qualify
1991–92	1991–92	Campbell	Norris	5th	80	30	43	7	—	67	234	294	—	—	—	—	—	—	Did not qualify
1992–93	1992–93	Campbell	Norris	3rd	84	44	29	11	—	99	288	241	21	11	10	—	69	63	Won in division semifinals, 4–3 (Red Wings); Won in division finals, 4–3 (Blues); Lost in conference finals, 3–4 (Kings)
1993–94	1993–94	Western (Note: The NHL realigned into Eastern and Western conferences prior to the 1993–94 season. Toronto was placed in the Central Division of the Western Conference.)	Central	2nd	84	43	29	12	—	98	280	243	18	9	9	—	50	47	Won in conference quarterfinals, 4–2 (Blackhawks); Won in conference semifinals, 4–3 (Sharks); Lost in conference finals, 1–4 (Canucks)
1994–95 (Note: The season was shortened to 48 games because of the 1994–95 NHL lockout.)	1994–95	Western	Central	4th	48	21	19	8	—	50	135	146	7	3	4	—	20	22	Lost in conference quarterfinals, 3–4 (Blackhawks)
1995–96	1995–96	Western	Central	3rd	82	34	36	12	—	80	247	252	6	2	4	—	15	21	Lost in conference quarterfinals, 2–4 (Blues)
1996–97	1996–97	Western	Central	6th	82	30	44	8	—	68	230	273	—	—	—	—	—	—	Did not qualify
1997–98	1997–98	Western	Central	6th	82	30	43	9	—	69	194	237	—	—	—	—	—	—	Did not qualify
1998–99	1998–99	Eastern (Note: The NHL realigned before the 1998–99 season. The Maple Leafs were placed in the Northeast Division of the Eastern Conference.)	Northeast	2nd	82	45	30	7	—	97	268	231	17	9	8	—	43	46	Won in conference quarterfinals, 4–2 (Flyers); Won in conference semifinals, 4–2 (Penguins); Lost in conference finals, 1–4 (Sabres)
1999–2000	1999–2000	Eastern	Northeast↑	1st	82	45	27	7	3 (Note: Beginning with the 1999–2000 season, teams received one point for losing a regular-season game in overtime.)	100	246	222	12	6	6	—	26	26	Won in conference quarterfinals, 4–2 (Senators); Lost in conference semifinals, 2–4 (Devils)
2000–01	2000–01	Eastern	Northeast	3rd	82	37	29	11	5	90	232	207	11	7	4	—	28	24	Won in conference quarterfinals, 4–0 (Senators); Lost in conference semifinals, 3–4 (Devils)
2001–02	2001–02	Eastern	Northeast	2nd	82	43	25	10	4	100	249	207	20	10	10	—	44	49	Won in conference quarterfinals, 4–3 (Islanders); Won in conference semifinals, 4–3 (Senators); Lost in conference finals, 2–4 (Hurricanes)
2002–03	2002–03	Eastern	Northeast	2nd	82	44	28	7	3	98	236	208	7	3	4	—	16	24	Lost in conference quarterfinals, 3–4 (Flyers)
2003–04	2003–04	Eastern	Northeast	2nd	82	45	24	10	3	103	242	204	13	6	7	—	27	28	Won in conference quarterfinals, 4–3 (Senators); Lost in conference semifinals, 2–4 (Flyers)
2004–05 (Note: The season was cancelled because of the 2004–05 NHL lockout.)	2004–05	Season cancelled due to 2004–05 NHL lockout																	
2005–06	2005–06	Eastern	Northeast	4th	82	41	33	— (Note: Beginning in the 2005–06 season, the NHL instituted a penalty shootout for regular-season games that remained tied after a five-minute overtime period, with losing teams receiving a point, which prevented ties.)	8	90	257	270	—	—	—	—	—	—	Did not qualify
2006–07	2006–07	Eastern	Northeast	3rd	82	40	31	—	11	91	258	269	—	—	—	—	—	—	Did not qualify
2007–08	2007–08	Eastern	Northeast	5th	82	36	35	—	11	83	231	260	—	—	—	—	—	—	Did not qualify
2008–09	2008–09	Eastern	Northeast	5th	82	34	35	—	13	81	250	293	—	—	—	—	—	—	Did not qualify
2009–10	2009–10	Eastern	Northeast	5th	82	30	38	—	14	74	214	267	—	—	—	—	—	—	Did not qualify
2010–11	2010–11	Eastern	Northeast	4th	82	37	34	—	11	85	218	251	—	—	—	—	—	—	Did not qualify
2011–12	2011–12	Eastern	Northeast	4th	82	35	37	—	10	80	231	264	—	—	—	—	—	—	Did not qualify
2012–13 (Note: The season was shortened to 48 games because of the 2012–13 NHL lockout.)	2012–13	Eastern	Northeast	3rd	48	26	17	—	5	57	145	133	7	3	4	—	18	22	Lost in conference quarterfinals, 3–4 (Bruins)
2013–14	2013–14	Eastern	Atlantic (Note: The NHL realigned prior to the 2013–14 season. The Maple Leafs were placed in the Atlantic Division of the Eastern Conference.)	6th	82	38	36	—	8	84	231	256	—	—	—	—	—	—	Did not qualify
2014–15	2014–15	Eastern	Atlantic	7th	82	30	44	—	8	68	211	262	—	—	—	—	—	—	Did not qualify
2015–16	2015–16	Eastern	Atlantic	8th	82	29	42	—	11	69	198	246	—	—	—	—	—	—	Did not qualify
2016–17	2016–17	Eastern	Atlantic	4th	82	40	27	—	15	95	251	242	6	2	4	—	16	18	Lost in first round, 2–4 (Capitals)
2017–18	2017–18	Eastern	Atlantic	3rd	82	49	26	—	7	105	277	232	7	3	4	—	16	21	Lost in first round, 3–4 (Bruins)
2018–19	2018–19	Eastern	Atlantic	3rd	82	46	28	—	8	100	286	251	7	3	4	—	17	23	Lost in first round, 3–4 (Bruins)
2019–20 (Note: The regular season was suspended on March 12, 2020 because of the COVID-19 pandemic. Eventually, the season resumed with the postseason in an expanded 24-team format on August 1, 2020.)	2019–20	Eastern	Atlantic	3rd	70	36	25	—	9	81	238	227	5	2	3	—	10	12	Lost in qualifying round, 2–3 (Blue Jackets)
2020–21 (Note: The start of the regular season was delayed until January 2021 because of the COVID-19 pandemic, resulting in a shorted 56 game schedule.)	2020–21	—	North↑	1st	56	35	14	—	7	77	187	148	7	3	4	—	18	14	Lost in first round, 3–4 (Canadiens)
2021–22	2021–22	Eastern	Atlantic	2nd	82	54	21	—	7	115	315	253	7	3	4	—	24	23	Lost in first round, 3–4 (Lightning)
2022–23	2022–23	Eastern	Atlantic	2nd	82	50	21	—	11	111	279	222	11	5	6	—	33	35	Won in first round, 4–2 (Lightning); Lost in second round, 1–4 (Panthers)
2023–24	2023–24	Eastern	Atlantic	3rd	82	46	26	—	10	102	303	263	7	3	4	—	12	18	Lost in first round, 3–4 (Bruins)
2024–25	2024–25	Eastern	Atlantic↑	1st	82	52	26	—	4	108	268	231	13	7	6	—	36	42	Won in first round, 4–2 (Senators); Lost in second round, 3–4 (Panthers)
2025–26	2025–26	Eastern	Atlantic	8th	82	32	36	—	14	78	253	299	—	—	—	—	—	—	Did not qualify
Totals					7,196	3,234	2,959	783	220	7,471	22,295	22,190	601	285	312	4	1,554	1,662	74 playoff appearances

=== All-time records ===
Statistic	GP	W	L	T	OT
Regular season record (1917–present)	7,196	3,234	2,959	783	220
Postseason record (1917–present)	601	285	312	4	—
All-time regular and postseason record	7,797	3,519	3,271	787	220
All-time series record: 60–61

== See also ==
- List of Toronto Hockey Club seasons
