= 1918–19 Toronto Arenas season =

NHL hockey team season

1918–19 Toronto Arenas
- League: 3rd (1st half), 3rd (2nd half) NHL
- 1918–19 record: 5–13–0 (overall)
- Home record: 5–4–0
- Road record: 0–9–0
- Goals for: 65
- Goals against: 92

Team information
- General manager: Charles Querrie
- Coach: Dick Carroll
- Captain: Ken Randall
- Arena: Arena Gardens

Team leaders
- Goals: Alf Skinner (12)
- Assists: Ken Randall (6)
- Points: Alf Skinner (15)
- Penalty minutes: Rusty Crawford (51)
- Wins: Bert Lindsay (5)
- Goals against average: Hap Holmes (4.50)

The 1918–19 Toronto Arenas season was the second season of the Toronto franchise of the National Hockey League. After being operated on a temporary basis in the previous year, the team became a formal entity, known as the 'Toronto Arena Hockey Club.' The club played 18 games and suspended operations.

== Regular season ==
The NHL had been formed mainly because the other four clubs in the National Hockey Association were unable to expel Toronto Blueshirts owner Eddie Livingstone, even though they had long since lost patience with him. To get around this, they suspended the NHA's operations and created the NHL, but didn't invite Livingstone to join them. Motivated by a desire to have a team in Toronto, as well as balance the schedule with the Quebec Bulldogs sitting out the season, the NHL granted a temporary franchise to the Toronto Arena Company, who then leased most of Livingstone's players pending resolution of the dispute.

However, the "Torontos" won the Stanley Cup, throwing a monkey wrench into the other owners' plans to get rid of Livingstone. Estimating that his team was worth $20,000, Livingstone was unwilling to accept the Arena Company's offer of $7,000. When the Arena Company refused to bend, Livingstone sued the Arena Company and Charlie Querrie for the $20,000. A league meeting of the old NHA proved futile as heated arguments broke out between Livingstone and the other owners. The old NHA was extinguished. However, Montreal Canadiens owner George Kennedy gave some ground, saying that if Livingstone dropped his lawsuits, he might be allowed in the league.

In the meantime, the Arena Company returned its temporary franchise to the NHL. It then formed a separate club, the Toronto Arena Hockey Club, nominally owned by Arena Company treasurer Hubert Vearncombe. The new club applied for full membership in the NHL, which was duly granted. This separated the hockey club from the Livingstone lawsuits, though the franchise still used Livingstone's players without permission.

It was announced on February 18, that Ken Randall and Harry Meeking had signed with Glace Bay of the Maritime League with the Arenas' permission. The game that night was attended by only 1,000 fans watching a 4–3 overtime loss to Ottawa. After a follow-up game in Ottawa on February 20, lost 9–3, manager Querrie announced that the club sought to withdraw from the NHL season and this was agreed to by Ottawa and Montreal. The NHL season ended at 18 games, with Montreal and Ottawa to play off for the championship.

=== Final standings ===
First half
	GP	W	L	T	Pts	GF	GA
**Montreal Canadiens**	10	7	3	0	14	57	50
Ottawa Senators	10	5	5	0	10	39	39
Toronto Arenas	10	3	7	0	6	42	49

Second half
	GP	W	L	T	Pts	GF	GA
**Ottawa Senators**	8	7	1	0	14	32	14
Montreal Canadiens	8	3	5	0	6	31	28
Toronto Arenas	8	2	6	0	4	22	43

Note: GP = Games Played, W = Wins, L = Losses, T = Ties, Pts = Points, GF = Goals For, GA = Goals Against
Teams that qualified for the playoffs are highlighted in bold.

=== Record vs. opponents ===
1918–19 NHL Records
Team	MTL	OTT	TOR
Montreal	—	4–5	6–3
Ottawa	5–4	—	7–2
Toronto	3–6	2–7	—

== Schedule and results ==
1918–19 regular season
First half

Game	Date	Visitor	Score	Home	Record	Pts
1	December 23	Montreal Canadiens	4–3	Toronto Arenas	0–1–0	0
2	December 26	Toronto Arenas	2–5	Ottawa Senators	0–2–0	0
3	December 28	Toronto Arenas	3–6	Montreal Canadiens	0–3–0	0
4	December 31	Ottawa Senators	2–4	Toronto Arenas	1–3–0	2
5	January 7	Montreal Canadiens	7–6	Toronto Arenas	1–4–0	2
6	January 9	Toronto Arenas	2–4	Ottawa Senators	1–5–0	2
7	January 11	Toronto Arenas	4–13	Montreal Canadiens	1–6–0	2
8	January 14	Ottawa Senators	2–5	Toronto Arenas	2–6–0	4
9	January 21	Montreal Canadiens	3–11	Toronto Arenas	3–6–0	6
10	January 23	Toronto Arenas	2–3	Ottawa Senators	3–7–0	6

Second half

Game	Date	Visitor	Score	Home	Record	Pts
1	January 28	Ottawa Senators	2–1	Toronto Arenas	0–1–0	0
2	February 1	Toronto Arenas	0–10	Montreal Canadiens	0–2–0	0
3	February 4	Montreal Canadiens	3–6	Toronto Arenas	1–2–0	2
4	February 6	Toronto Arenas	1–3	Ottawa Senators	1–3–0	2
5	February 11	Montreal Canadiens	4–6	Toronto Arenas	2–3–0	4
6	February 15	Toronto Arenas	2–8	Montreal Canadiens	2–4–0	4
7	February 18	Ottawa Senators	4–3	Toronto Arenas	2–5–0	4
8	February 20	Toronto Arenas	3–9	Ottawa Senators	2–6–0	4

Legend: Win (2 points) Loss (0 points) Tie (1 point)

== Player statistics ==
=== Scorers ===
Player	GP	G	A	Pts	PIM
Alf Skinner	17	12	4	16	26
Reg Noble	17	10	5	15	35
Ken Randall	14	8	6	14	27
Corb Denneny	16	8	3	11	15
Rusty Crawford	18	7	4	11	51
Harry Meeking	14	7	3	10	32
Harry Cameron	7	6	2	8	9
Jack Adams	17	3	3	6	35
Harry Mummery	13	2	0	2	30
Hap Holmes	2	0	0	0	0
Paul Jacobs	1	0	0	0	0
Bert Lindsay	16	0	0	0	0
Dave Ritchie	4	0	0	0	9

Note:

Pos = Position;GP = Games played; G = Goals; A = Assists; Pts = Points; PIM = Penalty minutes; +/- = Plus/minus; PPG = Power-play goals; SHG = Short-handed goals; GWG = Game-winning goals
Pos = Position;GP = Games played; Min, TOI = Minutes played; W = Wins; L = Losses; T,T/OT = Ties; OTL = Overtime losses; GA = Goals-against; GAA = Goals-against average; SO = Shutouts; SA = Shots against; SV = Shots saved;SV% = Save percentage;

== Transactions ==
- December 14, 1918: Acquired Rusty Crawford from the Ottawa Senators for future considerations
- December 15, 1918: Signed Free Agent Paul Jacobs
- December 28, 1918: Signed Free Agent Bert Lindsay
- January 19, 1919: Loaned Harry Cameron to Ottawa Senators to complete December 14 trade

== See also ==
- List of pre-NHL seasons
- 1918 in sports
- 1919 in sports
