= Presidents' Trophy =

Ice hockey award

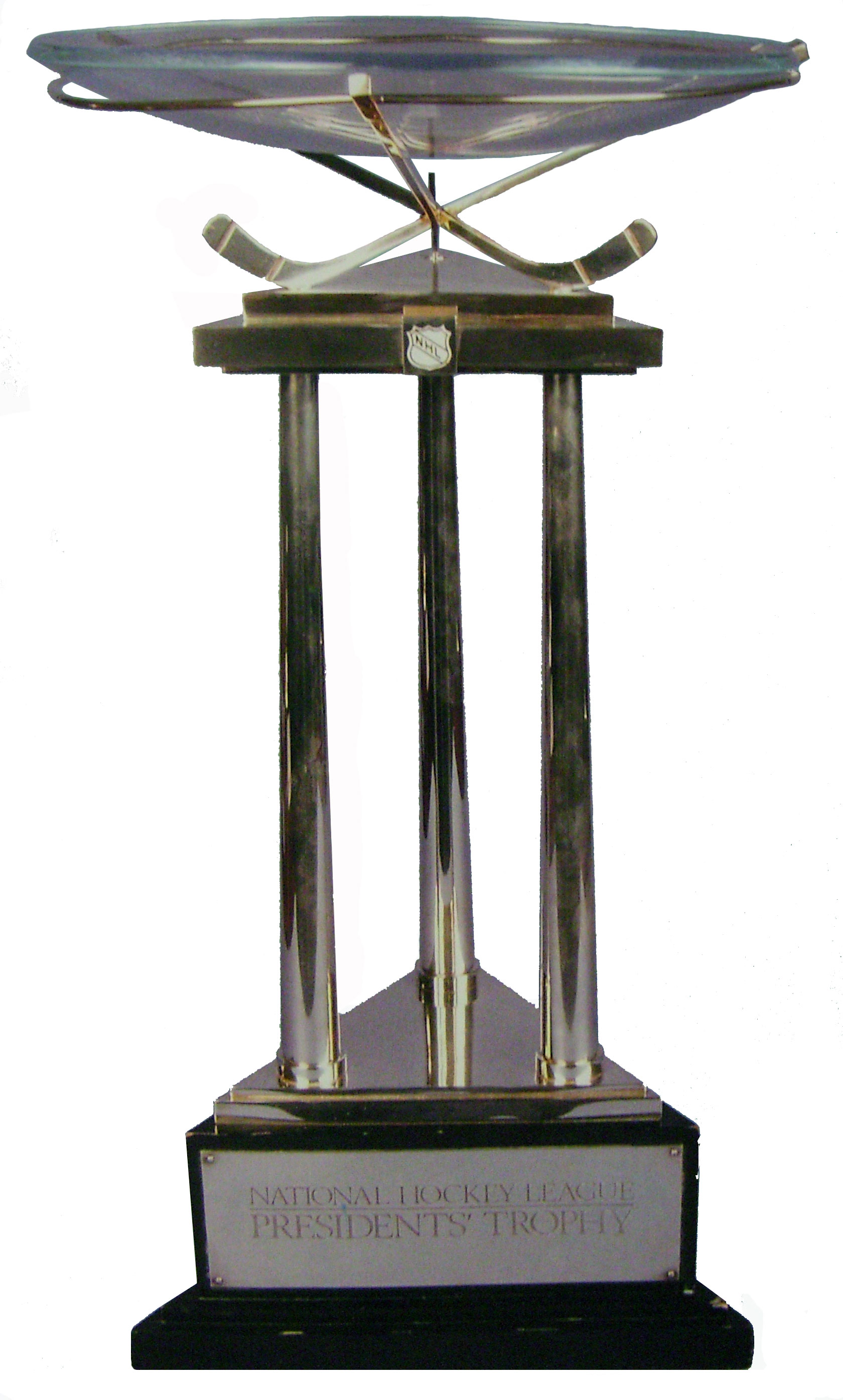
- Sport: Ice hockey
- Awarded for: National Hockey League team with the most points in the regular season

History
- First award: 1986
- First winner: Edmonton Oilers
- Most wins: Detroit Red Wings (6)
- Most recent: Colorado Avalanche (4)

The Presidents' Trophy (French: Trophée des présidents) is an award presented by the National Hockey League (NHL) to the team that finishes with the best record (i.e., most points) during the regular season. The Presidents' Trophy has been awarded 40 times to 19 different teams since its inception during the 1985–86 NHL season., with four active other teams having the best record before then, as well as two which no longer exist.

The trophy winner is the top-seeded team in the postseason which guarantees home-ice advantage in all rounds of the Stanley Cup playoffs for as far as they can advance. (Note: Due to the COVID-19 pandemic, the Bruins only played 70 games when the 2019–20 season regular season was curtailed. Under the special 2020 playoff format that was then conducted, with a round-robin tournament for the top four teams in each conference, the Bruins were not guaranteed home-ice advantage in all postseason rounds. Boston's 100 points in 70 games extrapolates to 117 points in an 82-game regular season.) Winning the award does not assure playoff success, as only eight winners have gone on to win the Stanley Cup; three Presidents' Trophy winners have been defeated in the Stanley Cup Final. Nonetheless, the team winning the trophy has won the Cup more than any other playoff seed. The most recent team to win both the trophy and the Stanley Cup in the same season is the 2012–13 Chicago Blackhawks; the only team to accomplish this feat more than once is the Detroit Red Wings (2002 and 2008).

== History ==
The trophy was introduced at the start of the 1985–86 season by the League's Board of Governors to recognize the best team in the regular season, informally known as the regular-season championship. Before this, the team that finished in first place when the regular season concluded was allowed to hang a banner reading "NHL League Champions."

A total of 18 teams have won the Presidents' Trophy. The Detroit Red Wings have won six Presidents' Trophies, the most of any team. The Boston Bruins, New York Rangers, and Colorado Avalanche are tied for second with four.

If there are two or more teams tied for first in points in the League, then the NHL's standard tiebreaking procedure is applied, with the first tiebreaker being the team with the most regulation wins (that is, all games won except those won in overtime or in a shootout). During the shortened 2020–21 season, both the Colorado Avalanche and Vegas Golden Knights finished tied for first with 82 points in 56 games, with Colorado winning the trophy since they had 35 regulation wins while Vegas had 30. From the 2010–11 through 2018–19 seasons, the first tiebreaker was most regulation and overtime wins. Before 2010, the first tiebreaker was the most wins, including both overtime and shootout wins. The most notable of the pre-2010–11 protocol is from the 2006–07 season, where both the Buffalo Sabres and Detroit Red Wings finished tied first with 113 points, with the Sabres winning the Trophy since they had 53 wins, three more than Detroit, who had 50.

=== Past trophies ===
From 1937 to 1967, the same criterion now observed for winning the Presidents' Trophy was used to award the Prince of Wales Trophy. With the modern era expansion in the 1967–68 season and the creation of the West Division, the Wales Trophy was awarded to the team that finished in first place in the East Division during the regular season. However, no trophy was awarded to the team that finished with the best overall record in the entire League during this period, and no trophy at all was awarded based on the results of the regular season from the 1981–82 through 1984–85 seasons. A cash bonus of $350,000 was awarded to the winning team with the NHL's best regular season record during these years, to which the Presidents' Trophy was added in 1985–86. The cash bonus is split amongst the players on the active roster of the winning team.

Factoring all NHL seasons prior to the introduction of the Presidents' Trophy, the Montreal Canadiens have finished first overall 21 times, the most times in League history (although this was most recently accomplished in 1977–78, before the Trophy was introduced; since its inception, the Canadiens have been Presidents' runners-up three times, in 1987–88, 1988–89, and 2014–15). Detroit is second with 18 first-overall finishes.

== Playoff implications ==
"It is the reality of the sport. If your particular strength happens to be that you're really good offensively, and you come up against a hot goaltender and a team that is stout defensively, it might not matter that you were good on a nightly basis scoring goals. And that one particular opponent: you'll have to beat them four times."

— NHL broadcaster Darren Eliot explaining the lack of success of Presidents' Trophy winners winning the Stanley Cup.

The Presidents' Trophy winner is normally guaranteed home-ice advantage throughout the Stanley Cup playoffs as the top seed. This does not necessarily correlate to success in the playoffs, however. The Trophy has been awarded 37 times, but only eight of the winners have gone on to win the Stanley Cup in their respective years, leading to a popular superstition that the Trophy may be cursed. In addition, eight Presidents' Trophy winners have been eliminated in the first round of the playoffs, with first-round upsets being common in the NHL compared to other major professional sports. Since the salary cap era of the NHL from 2005–06 onwards the first-placed NHL team has had the lowest probability of winning the playoff championship, compared to the other three North American major professional sports leagues (NBA, MLB, and NFL).

NHL broadcaster Darren Eliot attributes the apparent lack of playoff success to the different style of competition compared to the regular season: instead of playing different teams every night, the goal is to advance through four best-of-seven playoff series. The Presidents' Trophy winner may have to go through other playoff clubs who might have a hotter goaltender, a better defensive team or other players that pose match-up problems. If the regular season champion's primary success was merely outscoring others, they may be out of luck facing goaltenders that can shut them out. The lack of playoff experience may have been to blame in the examples of the 1999–2000 St. Louis Blues and 2008–09 San Jose Sharks, as neither team had advanced past the second round for five or more seasons. Teams have often given up pursuit of finishing first in the League in order to avoid injuries and rest key players for the postseason.

Ian Cooper, writing for the Toronto Star, noted that "of 11 Presidents' Trophy winners to lose in the first two rounds, seven came from divisions that were among the league's weaker half ... If a team dominates a weak division, its shortcomings should become apparent once it faces stiffer competition from the rest of the conference". Jonathan Weiss, writing for the Bleacher Report in 2010, also noted that of the teams between 1982 and 2009 that led the League in points during the regular season, 12 of them (45 per cent) reached the Stanley Cup Final, while of the other 405 teams during that same time period, only 42 (10 per cent) advanced to the final round, concluding that "the team that leads the NHL in regular season points is four to five times more likely than any other team in the playoffs to make it into the Stanley Cup Final, and seven to eight times more likely to win the Cup".

The Detroit Red Wings were considered an example of the Presidents' Trophy curse in the 1990s, as they reached the 1995 Stanley Cup Final only to be swept in four games by the underdog New Jersey Devils. The Red Wings went on to win their second straight Presidents' Trophy in their record-setting 1995–96 season, but they were defeated by the newly relocated Colorado Avalanche in the conference finals, sparking a particularly vicious rivalry between the two teams in subsequent seasons. In the 1996–97 season, the Avalanche were the defending Cup champions and won the Presidents' Trophy but lost the conference finals which was a rematch against the Red Wings who went on to win the Cup. The Red Wings would go onto the defeat the Presidents' Trophy-winning Dallas Stars in the 1998 Western Conference finals, en route to the Red Wings' second straight Cup win. Thereafter, in three of four seasons, the Presidents' Trophy winning team went on to win the Stanley Cup (Stars in 1999, Avalanche in 2001, and Red Wings in 2002).

Since the Blackhawks won the Presidents' Trophy and Stanley Cup in the lockout-shortened 2012–13 season, the "curse" has been more pronounced. The 2018–19 Tampa Bay Lightning were swept in the first round by the Wild Card Columbus Blue Jackets after a dominant season in which they tied the 1995–96 Detroit Red Wings' record for regular season wins, becoming the first Presidents' Trophy winner to suffer this fate. Adding to the ignominy was the Blue Jackets' previous lack of postseason success, as their sweep of the Lightning was their first playoff series victory in franchise history, with only four previous playoff qualifications. By contrast, the Lightning had made several deep playoff runs in the previous seasons (including a Cup Final appearance in 2015). Over the next three years, the Lightning did not win the Presidents' Trophy but nevertheless won two consecutive Stanley Cups while reaching a third consecutive Stanley Cup Final. For the 2022–23 Boston Bruins; after setting new records for single-season wins and points, they proceeded to lose in the first round in seven games to the Florida Panthers after having led the series three games to one. The Panthers were incidentally the previous season's Presidents' Trophy winners, where their 2021–22 season ended when they were swept in the second round by the Lightning (en route to the Lightning's third consecutive Finals appearance). The curse resurfaced in 2026, as the 2025–26 Colorado Avalanche entered the 2026 Western Conference final having gone 8–1 through the first two rounds of the Stanley Cup playoffs. However, they were then swept by the Vegas Golden Knights, who had entered the series as a major underdog; despite winning the Pacific Division, Vegas finished the regular season 26 points behind Colorado. Since the introduction of the salary cap in the 2005–06 season, just two Presidents' Trophy winners (the 2007–08 Red Wings and 2012–13 Blackhawks) have won the Stanley Cup in the same season.

Only five times in the history of the Presidents' Trophy has a team missed the playoffs the season after winning the award: the New York Rangers did it twice, who won the Trophy in the 1991–92 season and missed the playoffs in 1992–93 (and then rebounded to win both the Presidents' Trophy and Stanley Cup in 1993–94), however, they did it again when they won the Trophy in the 2023–24 season and missed the playoffs in 2024–25; the Buffalo Sabres, who won the Trophy in the 2006–07 season and missed the playoffs in 2007–08; the Boston Bruins, who won the Trophy in the 2013–14 season and missed the playoffs in 2014–15 despite having a winning record; and the Winnipeg Jets, who won the Trophy in the 2024–25 season and missed the playoffs in the {{NHL Year|2025|app=season]], the first time the reigning Presidents' Trophy winner missed the playoffs in consecutive seasons.

Due to the COVID-19 pandemic, the Boston Bruins only played 70 games when the 2019–20 season regular season was suspended, but were atop the standings and so received the Presidents' Trophy. Under the special 2020 playoff format that was then conducted, with a round-robin tournament for the top four teams in each conference, the Bruins were not guaranteed home-ice advantage in all postseason rounds.

== Winners ==
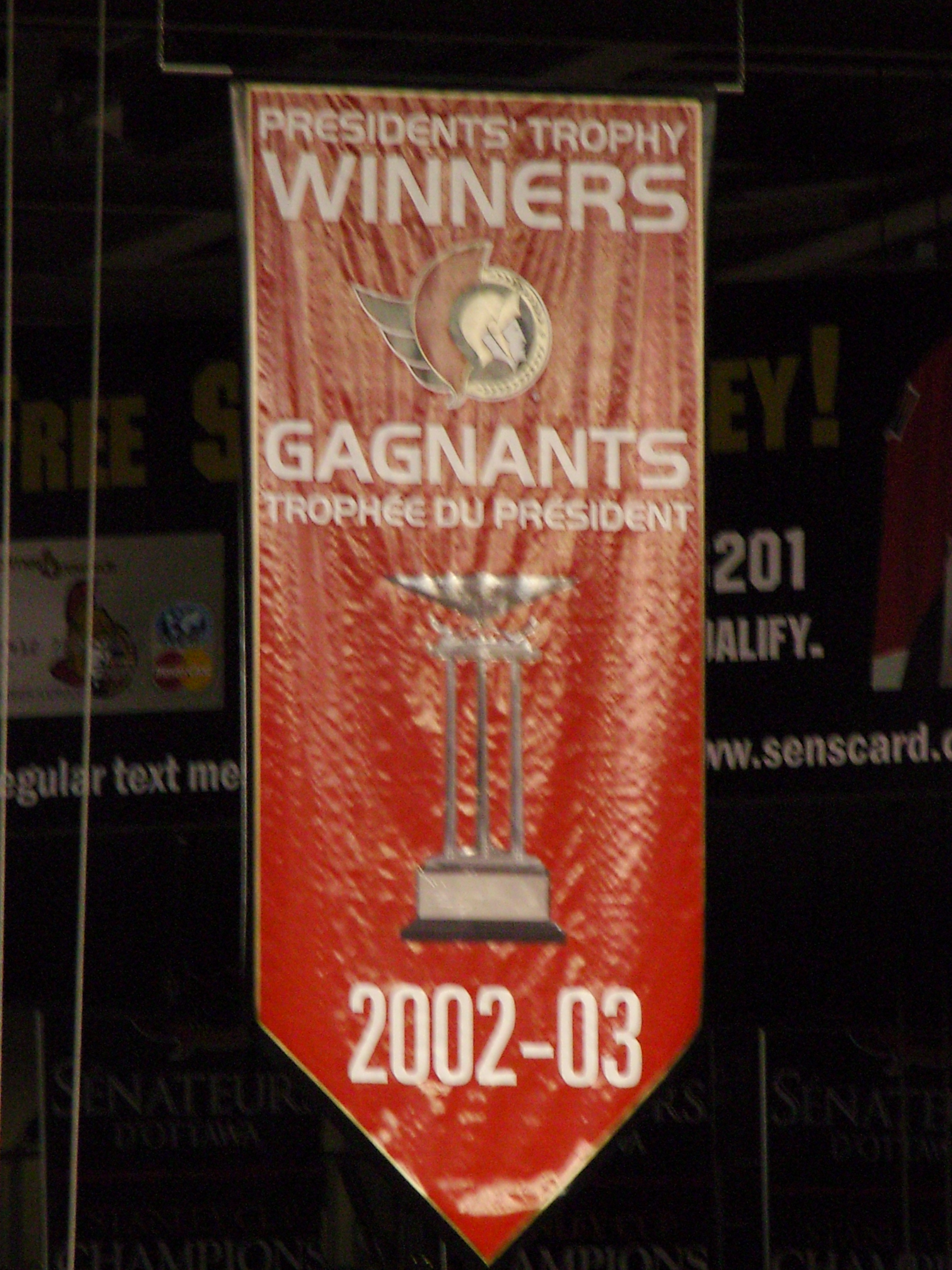
Ottawa Senators Presidents' Trophy Banner from the 2002–03 season

| * | Team won the Stanley Cup. |
| ^ | Team lost in the Stanley Cup Final. |
| # | Team lost in the first round of the playoffs. (Note: The playoff format has changed over the years. See Stanley Cup playoffs for more information.) |
| Eventual champion | Indicates the series winner won (or went on to win) the championship. |

Bold Team with the most points ever accumulated in a season during the trophy's existence.

| Year | Winner | Points | Margin | | Win # | Playoff result |
| Year | Winner | Points | Points | Games | Win # | Playoff result |
|---|---|---|---|---|---|---|
| 1985–86 | Edmonton Oilers | 119 | 9 | —N/a | 1 | Lost division finals (CGY) |
| 1986–87 | Edmonton Oilers | 106 | 6 | —N/a | 2 | Won Stanley Cup (PHI)* |
| 1987–88 | Calgary Flames | 105 | 2 | —N/a | 1 | Lost division finals (EDM) |
| 1988–89 | Calgary Flames | 117 | 2 | —N/a | 2 | Won Stanley Cup (MTL)* |
| 1989–90 | Boston Bruins | 101 | 2 | —N/a | 1 | Lost Stanley Cup Final (EDM)^ |
| 1990–91 | Chicago Blackhawks | 106 | 1 | —N/a | 1 | Lost division semifinals (MNS)# |
| 1991–92 | New York Rangers | 105 | 7 | —N/a | 1 | Lost division finals (PIT) |
| 1992–93 | Pittsburgh Penguins | 119 | 10 | —N/a | 1 | Lost division finals (NYI) |
| 1993–94 | New York Rangers | 112 | 6 | —N/a | 2 | Won Stanley Cup (VAN)* |
| 1994–95 | Detroit Red Wings | 70 (Note: Only 48 games were played in the 1994–95 season due to a lockout. Detroit's 70 points in 48 games extrapolates to 122 points in 84 games, which was the standard season length at the time.) | 5 | —N/a | 1 | Lost Stanley Cup Final (NJD)^ |
| 1995–96 | Detroit Red Wings | 131 | 27 | —N/a | 2 | Lost conference finals (COL) |
| 1996–97 | Colorado Avalanche | 107 | 3 | —N/a | 1 | Lost conference finals (DET) |
| 1997–98 | Dallas Stars | 109 | 2 | —N/a | 1 | Lost conference finals (DET) |
| 1998–99 | Dallas Stars | 114 | 9 | —N/a | 2 | Won Stanley Cup (BUF)* |
| 1999–2000 | St. Louis Blues | 114 | 6 | —N/a | 1 | Lost conference quarterfinals (SJS)# |
| 2000–01 | Colorado Avalanche | 118 | 7 | —N/a | 2 | Won Stanley Cup (NJD)* |
| 2001–02 | Detroit Red Wings | 116 | 15 | —N/a | 3 | Won Stanley Cup (CAR)* |
| 2002–03 | Ottawa Senators | 113 | 2 | —N/a | 1 | Lost conference finals (NJD) |
| 2003–04 | Detroit Red Wings | 109 | 3 | —N/a | 4 | Lost conference semifinals (CGY) |
| 2004–05 | Season cancelled due to the 2004–05 NHL lockout | | | | | |
| 2005–06 | Detroit Red Wings | 124 | 11 | —N/a | 5 | Lost conference quarterfinals (EDM)# |
| 2006–07 | Buffalo Sabres | 113 | 0 | 3 | 1 | Lost conference finals (OTT) |
| 2007–08 | Detroit Red Wings | 115 | 7 | —N/a | 6 | Won Stanley Cup (PIT)* |
| 2008–09 | San Jose Sharks | 117 | 1 | —N/a | 1 | Lost conference quarterfinals (ANA)# |
| 2009–10 | Washington Capitals | 121 | 8 | —N/a | 1 | Lost conference quarterfinals (MTL)# |
| 2010–11 | Vancouver Canucks | 117 | 10 | —N/a | 1 | Lost Stanley Cup Final (BOS)^ |
| 2011–12 | Vancouver Canucks | 111 | 2 | —N/a | 2 | Lost conference quarterfinals (LAK)# |
| 2012–13 | Chicago Blackhawks | 77 (Note: Only 48 games were played in the 2012–13 season due to a lockout. Chicago's 77 points in 48 games extrapolates to 132 points in an 82-game season; this number would have eclipsed Detroit's record by one, and would have tied the record-high of points held by the 1976–77 Montreal Canadiens (the trophy did not exist at the time, also, Montreal accomplished the feat in only 80 games and without the benefit of current overtime rules that award one point to teams losing in overtime or shootouts).) | 5 | —N/a | 2 | Won Stanley Cup (BOS)* |
| 2013–14 | Boston Bruins | 117 | 1 | —N/a | 2 | Lost second round (MTL) |
| 2014–15 | New York Rangers | 113 | 3 | —N/a | 3 | Lost conference finals (TBL) |
| 2015–16 | Washington Capitals | 120 | 11 | —N/a | 2 | Lost second round (PIT) |
| 2016–17 | Washington Capitals | 118 | 7 | —N/a | 3 | Lost second round (PIT) |
| 2017–18 | Nashville Predators | 117 | 3 | —N/a | 1 | Lost second round (WPG) |
| 2018–19 | Tampa Bay Lightning | 128 | 21 | —N/a | 1 | Lost first round (CBJ)# |
| 2019–20 | Boston Bruins | 100 | 6 | —N/a | 3 | Lost second round (TBL) |
| 2020–21 | Colorado Avalanche | 82 (Note: Due to the COVID-19 pandemic, the 2020–21 NHL season was shortened to 56 games. Colorado's 82 points in 56 games extrapolates to 120 points in an 82-game season.) | 0 | 5 (RW) | 3 | Lost second round (VGK) |
| 2021–22 | Florida Panthers | 122 | 3 | —N/a | 1 | Lost second round (TBL) |
| 2022–23 | Boston Bruins | 135 | 22 | —N/a | 4 | Lost first round (FLA)# |
| 2023–24 | New York Rangers | 114 | 1 | —N/a | 4 | Lost conference finals (FLA) |
| 2024–25 | Winnipeg Jets | 116 | 5 | —N/a | 1 | Lost second round (DAL) |
| 2025–26 | Colorado Avalanche | 121 | 8 | —N/a | 4 | Lost conference finals (VGK) |

There have been 14 Presidents' Trophy winners who lost to the eventual Stanley Cup champion, three of which were in the Stanley Cup Final itself.

== Earlier best records ==
For reference, the following are teams that finished with the best records in the NHL for each season between 1917–18 and 1984–85.

=== NHL vs. PCHA/WCHL/WHL Stanley Cup era (1917–1926) ===
Prior to 1926–27, the Stanley Cup was then awarded as a "World Series" trophy between the champions of the NHL and a rival league (first the Pacific Coast Hockey Association, then the Western Canada Hockey League). Instead, the NHL championship trophy during this era was the O'Brien Trophy.

From 1917–18 to 1920–21, the NHL season was split, requiring separate standings, with a single playoff series between the winner of the first half of the season and the winner of the second half of the season.

* Team won the O'Brien Trophy as the NHL playoff champion.
† Team won both the O'Brien Trophy and the Stanley Cup.
^ Team lost in the NHL championship/final round.

| Year | Winner | Points (Note: For the 1917–18 to 1920–21 seasons, this figure is the sum of the points accumulated during both halves of the season.) | Playoff result |
|---|---|---|---|
| 1917–18 | Toronto Hockey Club | 26 | NHL champions, won Stanley Cup† |
| 1918–19 | Ottawa Senators | 24 | Lost NHL championship (MTL)^ |
| 1919–20 | Ottawa Senators | 38 | NHL champions, won Stanley Cup† |
| 1920–21 | Toronto St. Patricks | 30 | Lost NHL championship (SEN)^ |
| 1921–22 | Ottawa Senators | 30 | Lost NHL championship (TSP)^ |
| 1922–23 | Ottawa Senators | 29 | NHL champions, won Stanley Cup† |
| 1923–24 | Ottawa Senators | 32 | Lost NHL championship (MTL)^ |
| 1924–25 | Hamilton Tigers | 39 | Suspended from playoffs (Note: A labour dispute between the Hamilton Tigers' owner and its players forced the team to be suspended from the playoffs.) |
| 1925–26 | Ottawa Senators | 52 | Lost NHL final round (MMR)^ |

=== NHL takes control of the Stanley Cup (since 1927) ===
After the 1925–26 season, the NHL became the only league left competing for the Stanley Cup. The Stanley Cup thus became the de facto NHL championship trophy, though the league did not take formal control of the trophy until 1947.

The Prince of Wales Trophy was awarded from 1938–39 to 1966–67 for the entire league regular season. In the 59 season span from the 1926-27 season to the 1984-85 season, 37 regular season champions reached the Stanley Cup Final and 30 won the Finals.

* Team won the Stanley Cup.
^ Team lost in the Stanley Cup Final.
# Team lost in a preliminary round of the playoffs.

| Year | Winner | Points (Note: Notwithstanding seasons shortened by labour or other similar issues, the regular season consisted of 44 games from 1926–27 to 1930–31 seasons, 48 games from 1931–32 to 1941–42, 50 games from 1942–43 to 1945–46, 60 games from 1946–47 to 1948–49, 70 games from 1949–50 to 1966–67 (end of the Original Six era), 74 games from 1967–68 to 1968–69, 76 games during the 1969–70 season, 78 games from 1970–71 to 1973–74, and 80 games from 1974–75 to 1991–92. The 1992–93 and 1993–94 seasons had 84 games, with two games played at neutral sites; neutral-site games were eliminated for the 1995–96 season.) | Playoff result |
|---|---|---|---|
| 1926–27 | Ottawa Senators | 64 | Won Stanley Cup* |
| 1927–28 | Montreal Canadiens | 59 | Lost semifinals (MMR)# |
| 1928–29 | Montreal Canadiens | 59 | Lost semifinals (BOS)# |
| 1929–30 | Boston Bruins | 77 | Lost Stanley Cup Final (MTL)^ |
| 1930–31 | Boston Bruins | 62 | Lost semifinals (MTL)# |
| 1931–32 | Montreal Canadiens | 57 | Lost semifinals (NYR)# |
| 1932–33 | Boston Bruins | 58 | Lost semifinals (TOR)# |
| 1933–34 | Toronto Maple Leafs | 61 | Lost semifinals (DET)# |
| 1934–35 | Toronto Maple Leafs | 64 | Lost Stanley Cup Final (MMR)^ |
| 1935–36 | Detroit Red Wings | 56 | Won Stanley Cup* |
| 1936–37 | Detroit Red Wings | 59 | Won Stanley Cup* |
| 1937–38 | Boston Bruins | 67 | Lost semifinals (TOR)# |
| 1938–39 | Boston Bruins | 74 | Won Stanley Cup* |
| 1939–40 | Boston Bruins | 67 | Lost semifinals (NYR)# |
| 1940–41 | Boston Bruins | 67 | Won Stanley Cup* |
| 1941–42 | New York Rangers | 60 | Lost semifinals (TOR)# |
| 1942–43 | Detroit Red Wings | 61 | Won Stanley Cup* |
| 1943–44 | Montreal Canadiens | 83 | Won Stanley Cup* |
| 1944–45 | Montreal Canadiens | 80 | Lost semifinals (TOR)# |
| 1945–46 | Montreal Canadiens | 61 | Won Stanley Cup* |
| 1946–47 | Montreal Canadiens | 78 | Lost Stanley Cup Final (TOR)^ |
| 1947–48 | Toronto Maple Leafs | 77 | Won Stanley Cup* |
| 1948–49 | Detroit Red Wings | 75 | Lost Stanley Cup Final (TOR)^ |
| 1949–50 | Detroit Red Wings | 88 | Won Stanley Cup* |
| 1950–51 | Detroit Red Wings | 101 | Lost semifinals (MTL)# |
| 1951–52 | Detroit Red Wings | 100 | Won Stanley Cup* |
| 1952–53 | Detroit Red Wings | 90 | Lost semifinals (BOS)# |
| 1953–54 | Detroit Red Wings | 88 | Won Stanley Cup* |
| 1954–55 | Detroit Red Wings | 95 | Won Stanley Cup* |
| 1955–56 | Montreal Canadiens | 100 | Won Stanley Cup* |
| 1956–57 | Detroit Red Wings | 88 | Lost semifinals (BOS)# |
| 1957–58 | Montreal Canadiens | 96 | Won Stanley Cup* |
| 1958–59 | Montreal Canadiens | 91 | Won Stanley Cup* |
| 1959–60 | Montreal Canadiens | 92 | Won Stanley Cup* |
| 1960–61 | Montreal Canadiens | 92 | Lost semifinals (CHI)# |
| 1961–62 | Montreal Canadiens | 98 | Lost semifinals (CHI)# |
| 1962–63 | Toronto Maple Leafs | 82 | Won Stanley Cup* |
| 1963–64 | Montreal Canadiens | 85 | Lost semifinals (TOR)# |
| 1964–65 | Detroit Red Wings | 87 | Lost semifinals (CHI)# |
| 1965–66 | Montreal Canadiens | 90 | Won Stanley Cup* |
| 1966–67 | Chicago Black Hawks | 94 | Lost semifinals (TOR)# |
| 1967–68 | Montreal Canadiens | 94 | Won Stanley Cup* |
| 1968–69 | Montreal Canadiens | 103 | Won Stanley Cup* |
| 1969–70 | Chicago Black Hawks | 99 | Lost semifinals (BOS)# |
| 1970–71 | Boston Bruins | 121 | Lost quarterfinals (MTL)# |
| 1971–72 | Boston Bruins | 119 | Won Stanley Cup* |
| 1972–73 | Montreal Canadiens | 120 | Won Stanley Cup* |
| 1973–74 | Boston Bruins | 113 | Lost Stanley Cup Final (PHI)^ |
| 1974–75 | Philadelphia Flyers | 113 | Won Stanley Cup* |
| 1975–76 | Montreal Canadiens | 127 | Won Stanley Cup* |
| 1976–77 | Montreal Canadiens | 132 | Won Stanley Cup* |
| 1977–78 | Montreal Canadiens | 129 | Won Stanley Cup* |
| 1978–79 | New York Islanders | 116 | Lost semifinals (NYR)# |
| 1979–80 | Philadelphia Flyers | 116 | Lost Stanley Cup Final (NYI)^ |
| 1980–81 | New York Islanders | 110 | Won Stanley Cup* |
| 1981–82 | New York Islanders | 118 | Won Stanley Cup* |
| 1982–83 | Boston Bruins | 110 | Lost conference finals (NYI)# |
| 1983–84 | Edmonton Oilers | 119 | Won Stanley Cup* |
| 1984–85 | Philadelphia Flyers | 113 | Lost Stanley Cup Final (EDM)^ |

== Records ==
=== Presidents' Trophy winners ===
| Team | Win # | Year(s) won |
|---|---|---|
| Detroit Red Wings | 6 | 1994–95, 1995–96, 2001–02, 2003–04, 2005–06, 2007–08 |
| Boston Bruins | 4 | 1989–90, 2013–14, 2019–20, 2022–23 |
| New York Rangers | 4 | 1991–92, 1993–94, 2014–15, 2023–24 |
| Colorado Avalanche | 4 | 1996–97, 2000–01, 2020–21, 2025–26 |
| Washington Capitals | 3 | 2009–10, 2015–16, 2016–17 |
| Edmonton Oilers | 2 | 1985–86, 1986–87 |
| Calgary Flames | 2 | 1987–88, 1988–89 |
| Chicago Blackhawks | 2 | 1990–91, 2012–13 |
| Dallas Stars | 2 | 1997–98, 1998–99 |
| Vancouver Canucks | 2 | 2010–11, 2011–12 |
| Pittsburgh Penguins | 1 | 1992–93 |
| St. Louis Blues | 1 | 1999–2000 |
| Ottawa Senators | 1 | 2002–03 |
| Buffalo Sabres | 1 | 2006–07 |
| San Jose Sharks | 1 | 2008–09 |
| Nashville Predators | 1 | 2017–18 |
| Tampa Bay Lightning | 1 | 2018–19 |
| Florida Panthers | 1 | 2021–22 |
| Winnipeg Jets | 1 | 2024–25 |

=== Combined pre-trophy/trophy era best records ===
| Team | Best record | Year(s) won |
|---|---|---|
| Montreal Canadiens* | 21 | 1927–28, 1928–29, 1931–32, 1943–44, 1944–45, 1945–46, 1946–47, 1955–56, 1957–58, 1958–59, 1959–60, 1960–61, 1961–62, 1963–64, 1965–66, 1967–68, 1968–69, 1972–73, 1975–76, 1976–77, 1977–78 |
| Detroit Red Wings | 18 | 1935–36, 1936–37, 1942–43, 1948–49, 1949–50, 1950–51, 1951–52, 1952–53, 1953–54, 1954–55, 1956–57, 1964–65, 1994–95, 1995–96, 2001–02, 2003–04, 2005–06, 2007–08 |
| Boston Bruins | 15 | 1929–30, 1930–31, 1932–33, 1937–38, 1938–39, 1939–40, 1940–41, 1970–71, 1971–72, 1973–74, 1982–83, 1989–90, 2013–14, 2019–20, 2022–23 |
| Ottawa Senators (1883–1934) | 7 | 1918–19, 1919–20, 1921–22, 1922–23, 1923–24, 1925–26, 1926–27 |
| Toronto Hockey Club/St. Patricks/Maple Leafs* | 6 | 1917–18, 1920–21, 1933–34, 1934–35, 1947–48, 1962–63 |
| New York Rangers | 5 | 1941–42, 1991–92, 1993–94, 2014–15, 2023–24 |
| Chicago Blackhawks | 4 | 1966–67, 1969–70, 1990–91, 2012–13 |
| Colorado Avalanche | 4 | 1996–97, 2000–01, 2020–21, 2025-26 |
| Philadelphia Flyers* | 3 | 1974–75, 1979–80, 1984–85 |
| New York Islanders* | 3 | 1978–79, 1980–81, 1981–82 |
| Edmonton Oilers | 3 | 1983–84, 1985–86, 1986–87 |
| Washington Capitals | 3 | 2009–10, 2015–16, 2016–17 |
| Calgary Flames | 2 | 1987–88, 1988–89 |
| Dallas Stars | 2 | 1997–98, 1998–99 |
| Vancouver Canucks | 2 | 2010–11, 2011–12 |
| Hamilton Tigers | 1 | 1924–25 |
| Pittsburgh Penguins | 1 | 1992–93 |
| St. Louis Blues | 1 | 1999–2000 |
| Ottawa Senators | 1 | 2002–03 |
| Buffalo Sabres | 1 | 2006–07 |
| San Jose Sharks | 1 | 2008–09 |
| Nashville Predators | 1 | 2017–18 |
| Tampa Bay Lightning | 1 | 2018–19 |
| Florida Panthers | 1 | 2021–22 |
| Winnipeg Jets | 1 | 2024–25 |

- Defunct teams in italics.
- *have never had the best record since the introduction of the Presidents' Trophy

== See also ==
- Continental Cup, a Kontinental Hockey League (KHL) trophy having the same function as the Presidents' Trophy.
- CPL Shield, a Canadian Premier League (CPL) trophy having the same function as the Presidents' Trophy.
- Maurice Podoloff Trophy, a National Basketball Association (NBA) trophy having the same function as the Presidents' Trophy.
- Supporters' Shield, a Major League Soccer (MLS) trophy having the same function as the Presidents' Trophy.
