= 1918–19 Ottawa Senators season =

National Hockey League team season

1918–19 Ottawa Senators
- 1918–19 record: 5–5–0 (1st half); 7–1–0 (2nd half)
- Home record: 8–1–0
- Road record: 4–5–0
- Goals for: 71
- Goals against: 53

Team information
- General manager: Tommy Gorman
- Coach: Alf Smith
- Captain: Jack Darragh
- Arena: The Arena

Team leaders
- Goals: Cy Denneny and Frank Nighbor (18)
- Assists: Sprague Cleghorn and Eddie Gerard (6)
- Points: Cy Denneny and Frank Nighbor (22)
- Penalty minutes: Cy Denneny (43)
- Wins: Clint Benedict (12)
- Goals against average: Clint Benedict (2.91)

The 1918–19 Ottawa Senators season was the club's 34th season, second in the National Hockey League (NHL), and they would see much improvement over the previous season. The season was cut short by the Toronto Arenas suspending operations, leaving the Senators and Montreal Canadiens to play the first best-of-seven playoff series to determine the NHL championship, won by Montreal.

== Team business ==
The club's ownership and arena arrangements changed in the off-season. Prior to the season, Ted Dey, as arena owner, held out the use of The Arena in negotiations with the Ottawa Hockey Club, of which he was one-third partner. Martin Rosenthal and Tommy Gorman, his hockey club partners, tried to use the Aberdeen Pavilion again. Meanwhile, Dey signed an agreement with Percy Quinn, who held an option on the Quebec city hockey club to rent The Arena for a new 'Canadian Hockey Association' league. This however was a ruse. However, his ruse worked to his advantage in negotiating with the Ottawa HC. When it became clear that the Aberdeen would not be converted back to hockey, Rosenthal gave up his share of the hockey club. As part of an agreement reached out, Dey and Gorman now became equal partners in the new 'Ottawa Arena Club' which operated the Ottawa hockey club in the NHL. The Ottawas were now bound to the Arena for the next five years as well. Rosenthal was provided $500 as compensation for his share.

Dey was sued by Percy Quinn for his actions and trial took place in December 1918 and January 1919 in Toronto. Quinn lost his legal case as the option on the Arena was not enough of a contract to prove legal fraud on Dey's part, who continued to offer a place in the Arena to Quinn. By this time, Quinn's proposed league had failed as the players had signed with Dey and Gorman and elsewhere with the NHL.

== Regular season ==
Senators player Hamby Shore died of pneumonia before the season began on October 14, 1918. He was a victim of the influenza epidemic that spread across North America from 1918 to 1919. Shore was 32 years old.

After a 5–5–0 record in the first half of the season, the Senators played to a 7–1–0 record in the second half.

Cy Denneny and Frank Nighbor led the team with 18 goals and 22 points each, while Clint Benedict won a league-best 12 games, along with his NHL leading 2.91 GAA.

After the season, the club travelled to Vancouver to play a best-of-three against the Millionaires, winning the exhibition series three games to two.

=== December ===
- **December 21** – The Senators opened the 1918–19 season on the road against the Montreal Canadiens at Jubilee Arena on December 21, as Ottawa defeated Montreal 5–2. Frank Nighbor scored twice and strong goaltending by Clint Benedict led the Senators to the win.
- **December 26** – Ottawa faced the Toronto Arenas for their home opener. Cy Denneny scored three goals in the first 5:15 of the game, leading the Senators to a 5–2 win and a 2–0–0 start to their season.
- **December 31** - Ottawa travelled to Mutual Street Arena in Toronto to face the Toronto Arenas. Cy Denneny scored twice for the Senators, however, his younger brother, Corb Denneny, recorded a hat trick for the Arenas as Ottawa dropped their first game of the season by a score of 4–2.

The Senators finished December with a 2–1–0 record, earning four points. Ottawa was tied with the Canadiens for first place in the NHL.

=== January ===
- **January 2** – Ottawa opened January with a home date against the Montreal Canadiens in a battle for first place in the NHL. Jack Darragh and Cy Denneny each scored twice as the Senators defeated the Canadiens 7–2.
- **January 4** - The Senators travelled to Montreal for the second game of a home-and-home series against the Montreal Canadiens. Cy Denneny and Frank Nighbor each scored for Ottawa, while Eddie Gerard recorded two assists, however, the Senators lost to Montreal 5–2.
- **January 9** - Ottawa returned home to face the Toronto Arenas. Cy Denneny scored three goals, while Frank Nighbor scored a goal and earned an assist in a 4–2 victory, improving the Senators record to 4–2–0.
- **January 14** - The Senators were on the road to face the Toronto Arenas for the backend of a home-and-home series. Frank Nighbor scored twice for the Senators, however, the Arenas Rusty Crawford led the way for Toronto with three goals, as Ottawa lost the game 5–2.
- **January 16** - The Senators were back at home to face the Montreal Canadiens. Ottawa had a tough game, as they were losing 10–2 midway through the third period. A late effort by the team saw them cut the deficit to four, as they lost the game 10–6. Jack Darragh recorded three goals for Ottawa. For the Canadiens, both Newsy Lalonde and Didier Pitre recorded hat tricks.
- **January 18** - Ottawa travelled to Montreal to face the Montreal Canadiens for the second game in a row. The Canadiens took an early 4–0 first period lead and held on to defeat the Senators 5–3. Frank Nighbor scored twice for the Senators. The loss was the third in a row by Ottawa and dropped their record to 4–5–0.
- **January 23** - The Senators closed out the first half of the season on home ice against the Toronto Arenas. Frank Nighbor recorded two goals, while Clint Benedict provided excellent goaltending, as the Senators defeated the Arenas 3–2. Ottawa finished the first half of the season with a 5–5–0 record, finishing in second place behind the Montreal Canadiens.
- **January 25** - Ottawa began the second half of the season with a road game against the Montreal Canadiens. Clint Benedict stopped every shot he faced, while Jack Darragh scored the lone goal of the game, as Ottawa shutout the Canadiens 1–0.
- **January 28** - The Senators continued their road trip for a game against the Toronto Arenas. Clint Benedict put together another excellent performance in goal, while Harry Cameron scored twice, including the overtime winner, in a 2–1 win over Toronto.
- **January 30** - Ottawa returned to home ice for a matchup against the Montreal Canadiens. The Senators stayed hot, as Jack Darragh scored twice and Harry Cameron scored his second consecutive overtime winning goal, as the Senators defeated the Canadiens 3–2. The win extended Ottawa's overall winning streak to four games.

At the end of January, the Senators had a perfect 3–0–0 record to start the second half of the season, earning six points and sitting in first place in the NHL standings.

=== February ===
- **February 6** - Ottawa faced the Toronto Arenas on home ice to begin the month of February. Frank Nighbor scored twice as the Senators defeated the Arenas 3–1, extending their winning streak to five games and a perfect 4–0–0 record in the second half of the season.
- **February 8** - The Senators travelled to Montreal for a road game against the Montreal Canadiens. Harry Cameron scored twice for Ottawa, however, the Canadiens ended the Senators five game winning streak as Ottawa lost the game 4–3.
- **February 13** - The Senators returned to home ice for a matchup against the Montreal Canadiens. Frank Nighbor scored twice and Clint Benedict recorded the shutout as the Senators dominated the Canadiens to a 7–0 victory. The win improved Ottawa's record to 5–1–0 in the second half of the season.
- **February 18** - Ottawa travelled to Toronto for their final road game of the regular season against the Toronto Arenas. The Senators overcame a 3–1 deficit late in the third period to tie the game and send it into overtime. In the extra period, Punch Broadbent scored his second goal of the game, lifting the Senators a 4–3 win over the Arenas. Frank Nighbor scored a goal and earned two assists in the game.
- **February 20** - The Senators closed out the regular season on home ice with a matchup against the Toronto Arenas. The Senators, led by three goals by Cy Denneny and a two-goal, two assist game by Sprague Cleghorn, dominated the Arenas and won the game 9–3. Frank Nighbor and Punch Broadbent each recorded three point games.

Ottawa finished the second half of the season with a 7–1–0 record, earning 14 points and finishing in first place. The club qualified for the playoffs, and they faced the Montreal Canadiens for the NHL championship.

=== Final standings ===
First half
	GP	W	L	T	Pts	GF	GA
**Montreal Canadiens**	10	7	3	0	14	57	50
Ottawa Senators	10	5	5	0	10	39	39
Toronto Arenas	10	3	7	0	6	42	49

Second half
	GP	W	L	T	Pts	GF	GA
**Ottawa Senators**	8	7	1	0	14	32	14
Montreal Canadiens	8	3	5	0	6	31	28
Toronto Arenas	8	2	6	0	4	22	43

Note: GP = Games Played, W = Wins, L = Losses, T = Ties, Pts = Points, GF = Goals For, GA = Goals Against
Teams that qualified for the playoffs are highlighted in bold.

=== Record vs. opponents ===
1918–19 NHL Records
Team	MTL	OTT	TOR
Montreal	—	4–5	6–3
Ottawa	5–4	—	7–2
Toronto	3–6	2–7	—

== Playoffs ==
Montreal Canadiens 4, Ottawa Senators 1

Ottawa faced the Montreal Canadiens, winners of the first half of the NHL season, in a best-of-seven series, deciding who would represent the NHL at the 1919 Stanley Cup Final.

- Game 1 –The series opened on the road in Montreal on February 22 at the Jubilee Arena. The Canadiens took an early 1–0 lead on a goal by Didier Pitre 2:25 into the game. The Senators stormed back with a goal by Cy Denneny at the 3:35 mark of the first period, the first ever playoff goal by the Senators since joining the NHL, to tie the game. Harry Cameron then gave Ottawa a 2–1 lead 90 seconds later, as that was the score after the first period. The Canadiens scored three consecutive goals to begin the second period, taking a 4–2 lead, however, Jack Darragh scored with only seven seconds left in the period, cutting the deficit to 4–3. Newsy Lalonde opened the scoring for Montreal in the third period, his second goal of the game, giving the Canadiens a 5–3 lead, however, Darragh scored his second goal midway through the period, cutting the Canadiens lead to 5–4. This was as close as Ottawa could get, as Montreal scored three goals in a 40-second span later in the period, leading them to a victory of 8–4 and a 1–0 series lead.
- Game 2 –The series shifted to Ottawa for game two on February 27. After a scoreless first period, the Senators struck first as Harry Cameron scored his second goal of the series 4:00 into the second period, giving Ottawa a 1–0 lead. The Canadiens Joe Malone then scored two goals in a five-minute span, as Montreal took a 2–1 lead. Georges Boucher scored with 1:00 remaining in the period for the Senators, tying the game at 2–2 after two periods. In the third period, the Canadiens Odie Cleghorn scored three consecutive goals in the first ten minutes, giving Montreal a 5–2 lead. Cy Denneny scored late in the period, making the final score 5–3 for Montreal as the Canadiens took a 2–0 series lead.
- Game 3 –The third game was played in Montreal on March 1. The Canadiens Newsy Lalonde scored twice in the first period, giving the team a 2–0 lead after 20 minutes of play. Lalonde scored his third goal of the game to open the second period, followed by a goal by Didier Pitre, extending the Canadiens lead to 4–0. Punch Broadbent finally got Ottawa on the board with a goal 45 seconds later, followed by a second Ottawa goal by Eddie Gerard 4:30 later, as Ottawa cut the Canadiens lead to 4–2. Lalonde then scored his fourth goal of the game late in the second period, as Montreal took a 5–2 lead after two periods. In the third period, Broadbent scored for the Senators, however, Lalonde scored his fifth goal of the game late in the period, giving Montreal a 6–3 win and a 3–0 series lead.
- Game 4 –The Senators were in a must-win situation for the fourth game played in Ottawa on March 3. The Senators opened the scoring on a goal by Eddie Gerard 9:00 into the first period, however, the Canadiens struck twice before the end of the period, taking 2–1 lead after the first. Ottawa's Cy Denneny tied the game 7:00 into the second period, followed by goals by Harry Cameron and Sprague Cleghorn, as the Senators took a 4–2 lead. The Canadiens struck back with a late second period goal by Newsy Lalonde, his second goal of the game and tenth of the series, as Ottawa held on to a slim 4–3 lead after the second period. In the third period, the Senators saw goals scored by Eddie Gerard and Georges Boucher, as Clint Benedict shutdown the Canadiens offense, as Ottawa won the game 6–3 and cut the Canadiens series lead to 3–1.
- Game 5 –The fifth game of the series was another must-win for Ottawa, as it was played in Montreal on March 6. The Canadiens Newsy Lalonde scored his series leading eleventh goal in the first period, giving Montreal a 1–0 lead after the first period. Ottawa's Harry Cameron tied the game with a goal 2:10 into the second period, however, the Canadiens regained the lead midway through the period of a goal by Joe Malone, making it 2–1 Montreal after two periods. In the third period, the Canadiens Bert Corbeau scored 1:40 into the period, extending Montreal's lead to 3–1. Ottawa's Sprague Cleghorn cut the Canadiens lead to 3–2 with a goal at the 5:10 mark of the period, however, the Senators could not come back, as Montreal's Odie Cleghorn scored midway through the period, and goaltender Georges Vezina shut the door on the Senators, as Montreal won the game 4–2 and took the series 4 games to 1.

== Schedule and results ==
=== Regular season ===
1918–19 regular season
First half: 5–5–0 (home: 4–1–0; road: 1–4–0)

Game	Date	Visitor	Score	Home	OT	Decision	Attendance	Arena	Record	Pts	Recap
1	December 21	Ottawa	5–2	Montreal		Benedict	N/A	Jubilee Rink	1–0–0	2	
2	December 26	Toronto	2–5	Ottawa		Benedict	N/A	The Arena	2–0–0	4	
3	December 31	Ottawa	2–4	Toronto		Benedict	N/A	Arena Gardens	2–1–0	4	
4	January 2	Montreal	2–7	Ottawa		Benedict	N/A	The Arena	3–1–0	6	
5	January 4	Ottawa	2–5	Montreal		Benedict	N/A	Jubilee Rink	3–2–0	6	
6	January 9	Toronto	2–4	Ottawa		Benedict	N/A	The Arena	4–2–0	8	
7	January 14	Ottawa	2–5	Toronto		Benedict	N/A	Arena Gardens	4–3–0	8	
8	January 16	Montreal	10–6	Ottawa		Benedict	N/A	The Arena	4–4–0	8	
9	January 18	Ottawa	3–5	Montreal		Benedict	N/A	Jubilee Rink	4–5–0	8	
10	January 23	Toronto	2–3	Ottawa		Benedict	N/A	The Arena	5–5–0	10	

Second half: 7–1–0 (home: 4–0–0; road: 3–1–0)

Game	Date	Visitor	Score	Home	OT	Decision	Attendance	Arena	Record	Pts	Recap
1	January 25	Ottawa	1–0	Montreal		Benedict	N/A	Jubilee Rink	1–0–0	2	
2	January 28	Ottawa	2–1	Toronto	OT	Benedict	N/A	Arena Gardens	2–0–0	4	
3	January 30	Montreal	2–3	Ottawa	OT	Benedict	N/A	The Arena	3–0–0	6	
4	February 6	Toronto	1–3	Ottawa		Benedict	N/A	The Arena	4–0–0	8	
5	February 8	Ottawa	3–4	Montreal		Benedict	N/A	Jubilee Rink	4–1–0	8	
6	February 13	Montreal	0–7	Ottawa		Benedict	N/A	The Arena	5–1–0	10	
7	February 18	Ottawa	4–3	Toronto	OT	Benedict	N/A	Arena Gardens	6–1–0	12	
8	February 20	Toronto	3–9	Ottawa		Benedict	N/A	The Arena	7–1–0	14	

Legend: Win (2 points) Loss (0 points) Tie (1 point)

=== Playoffs ===
1919 Stanley Cup playoffs
NHL championship vs. Montreal Canadiens – Canadiens win 4–1

Game	Date	Visitor	Score	Home	OT	Decision	Attendance	Arena	Series
1	February 22	Ottawa	4–8	Montreal		Benedict	N/A	Jubilee Rink	0–1
2	February 27	Montreal	5–3	Ottawa		Benedict	N/A	The Arena	0–2
3	March 1	Ottawa	3–6	Montreal		Benedict	N/A	Jubilee Rink	0–3
4	March 3	Montreal	3–6	Ottawa		Benedict	N/A	The Arena	1–3
5	March 6	Ottawa	2–4	Montreal		Benedict	N/A	Jubilee Rink	1–4

Legend: Win Loss Tie

== Playing statistics ==
=== Scoring leaders ===
Player	GP	G	A	Pts	PIM
Cy Denneny	18	18	4	22	43
Frank Nighbor	18	18	4	22	27
Jack Darragh	14	12	1	13	27
Sprague Cleghorn	18	6	6	12	27
Eddie Gerard	18	4	6	10	17

=== Goaltending ===
Player	GP	Min	W	L	T	GA	SO	GAA
Sprague Cleghorn	1	3	0	0	0	0	0	0.00
Clint Benedict	18	1113	12	6	0	54	2	2.91

Note:

Pos = Position;GP = Games played; G = Goals; A = Assists; Pts = Points; PIM = Penalty minutes; +/- = Plus/minus; PPG = Power-play goals; SHG = Short-handed goals; GWG = Game-winning goals
Pos = Position;GP = Games played; Min, TOI = Minutes played; W = Wins; L = Losses; T,T/OT = Ties; OTL = Overtime losses; GA = Goals-against; GAA = Goals-against average; SO = Shutouts; SA = Shots against; SV = Shots saved;SV% = Save percentage;

== Transactions ==
The Senators were involved in the following transactions during the 1918–19 season.

=== Trades ===
November 28, 1918	To Ottawa Senators Tommy Smith	To Montreal Canadiens Cash
December 9, 1918	To Ottawa Senators Skene Ronan	To Montreal Canadiens Harry Hyland
December 14, 1918	To Ottawa Senators Future Considerations (Loan of Harry Cameron on January 19, 1919)	To Toronto Arenas Rusty Crawford

=== Free agents ===
December 2, 1918	From Toronto Arenas Rusty Crawford
January 21, 1919	From WWI Military Service Punch Broadbent
February 17, 1919	From Ottawa Senators Skene Ronan

=== Released ===
January 26, 1919	From Ottawa Senators Skene Ronan

== See also ==
- 1918–19 NHL season
