= 1919 in sports =

1919 in sports describes the year's events in world sport. Although World War I had ended in 1918, the influenza pandemic and planning difficulties from the war still curtailed sport to a considerable extent.

== American football ==
- Green Bay Packers established at Green Bay, Wisconsin
- Decatur Staleys established at Decatur, Illinois; the club will relocate to Chicago in 1921 and rename itself Chicago Bears
- New York Pro Football League holds what is believed to be the first ever playoff tournament, won by the Buffalo Prospects
- Canton Bulldogs win Ohio League title and the de facto national championship
- Most professional teams reactivate after suspending operations the year before

== Association football ==
England

- Competitive football resumes after the end of World War I in the 1919–20 season
- The First Division is expanded from 20 to 22 teams; Chelsea is spared relegation, while Arsenal controversially win promotion from the Second Division, despite only finishing fifth in 1915, at the expense of rivals Tottenham Hotspur. Derby County and Preston North End are also promoted.
- The Second Division is expanded from 20 teams to 22, bringing the total number of League clubs to 44. Glossop is expelled from the league and five clubs are elected. Stoke FC is restored to the league while Coventry City, South Shields (membership until 1930), Rotherham United and West Ham United all join the league for the first time.
- Leeds City is expelled from the Football League due to financial irregularities after the 1919–20 season has begun; Port Vale is elected as a late entrant and takes over Leeds City's playing record to date.

France

- Formation of the French Football Federation (Fédération Française de Football or FFF)

Germany

- National Championship – suspended during World War I

Poland

- Formation of the Polish Football Association (Polski Związek Piłki Nożnej or PZPN)

Spain

- Valencia CF was founded in Spain, on March 18

== Australian rules football ==
VFL Premiership

- Collingwood wins the 23rd VFL Premiership, defeating Richmond 11.12 (78) to 7.11 (53) at Melbourne Cricket Ground (MCG) in the 1919 VFL Grand Final.

South Australian Football League

- 3 May: SAFL league football resumes after three seasons of “patriotic competitions” due to World War I.
- 27 September: Sturt and North Adelaide draw 5.9 (39) apiece in the 1919 SAFL Grand Final.
- 4 October: In a low-scoring replay, Sturt 3.5 (23) defeat North Adelaide 2.6 (18) to win their second SAFL premiership.

West Australian Football League

- 20 September: East Perth 10.8 (68) defeat East Fremantle 7.4 (46) to win their first WAFL premiership.

== Bandy ==
Sweden

- Championship final – IFK Uppsala 8–2 IF Göta

== Baseball ==
World Series

- Cincinnati Reds (NL) defeats Chicago White Sox (AL) to win the 1919 World Series by 5 games to 3

Events

- Even before game one of this World Series, there are rumours that some White Sox players have agreed to throw the series to the Reds for payment from gamblers. This will explode a year later in the Black Sox Scandal.
- Babe Ruth hits 29 home runs for the Boston Red Sox, breaking the single season record of 27 set by Ned Williamson in 1884

Minor leagues

- The Florida State League is founded with teams in Bartow, Bradenton, Lakeland, Orlando, Sandford and Tampa
- The Intercounty Baseball League is formed in Ontario, Canada with teams in Stratford, Guelph, Kitchener and Galt

== Boxing ==
Events

- 4 July — Jack Dempsey becomes World Heavyweight Champion by stopping Jess Willard, the defending champion, after three rounds. Dempsey would go on to become one of the greatest-ever heavyweight champions. His charisma and punching power enabling promoters to stage the first "million dollar gates".
- Jack Britton regains the World Welterweight Championship from Ted "Kid" Lewis for the second time, this time retaining it until his defeat by Mickey Walker in 1922.

Lineal world champions

- World Heavyweight Championship – Jess Willard → Jack Dempsey
- World Light Heavyweight Championship – Battling Levinsky
- World Middleweight Championship – Mike O'Dowd
- World Welterweight Championship – Ted "Kid" Lewis → Jack Britton
- World Lightweight Championship – Benny Leonard
- World Featherweight Championship – Johnny Kilbane
- World Bantamweight Championship – Pete Herman
- World Flyweight Championship – Jimmy Wilde

== Canadian football ==
- The Grey Cup was not contested this year due to various issues, including lack of interest in the east and a rule dispute in western Canada
- Interprovincial Rugby Football Union - Montreal AAA
- Western Canada Rugby Football Union - Regina
- Ontario Rugby Football Union - Toronto Rowing Club
- Intercollegiate Rugby Football Union - McGill

== Cricket ==
Events

- Very few first-class matches are played worldwide during the 1918–19 season but the County Championship is reintroduced in the 1919 English season to progress the game's post-war recovery.

England

- County Championship – Yorkshire
- Minor Counties Championship – not contested
- Most runs – Jack Hobbs 2594 @ 60.32 (HS 205*)
- Most wickets – Wilfred Rhodes 164 @ 14.42 (BB 8–44)
- Wisden Cricketers of the Year – Andy Ducat, Patsy Hendren, Percy Holmes, Herbert Sutcliffe, Ernest Tyldesley

Australia

- Sheffield Shield – not contested
- Most runs – Warwick Armstrong 249 @ 83.00 (HS 162*)
- Most wickets – Ted McDonald 25 @ 15.72 (BB 8–42)

India

- Bombay Quadrangular – Europeans

New Zealand

- Plunket Shield – Wellington (Dec 1918 to Jan 1919) and Canterbury (from Jan 1919)

South Africa

- 18 October – With the end of World War I, first-class cricket is played in South Africa for the first time since 13 April 1914. However, the interprovincial Currie Cup does not resume until 1920–21.

West Indies

- Inter-Colonial Tournament – not contested

== Cycling ==
Tour de France

- Firmin Lambot (Belgium) wins the 13th Tour de France

Giro d'Italia

- Costante Girardengo

== Figure skating ==
World Figure Skating Championships

- The championships are not contested

== Golf ==
Major tournaments

- British Open – not contested due to World War I
- US Open – Walter Hagen
- USPGA Championship – Jim Barnes

Other tournaments

- British Amateur – not contested due to World War I
- US Amateur – Davidson Herron

== Horse racing ==
Events

- Sir Barton is the first horse to win the United States Triple Crown

England

- Grand National – Poethlyn
- 1,000 Guineas Stakes – Roseway
- 2,000 Guineas Stakes – The Panther
- The Derby – Grand Parade
- The Oaks – Bayuda
- St. Leger Stakes – Keysoe

Australia

- Melbourne Cup – Artilleryman

Canada

- King's Plate – Ladder of Light

Ireland

- Irish Grand National – not contested
- Irish Derby Stakes – Loch Lomond

USA

- Kentucky Derby – Sir Barton
- Preakness Stakes – Sir Barton
- Belmont Stakes – Sir Barton

== Ice hockey ==
Stanley Cup

- Montreal Canadiens and Seattle Metropolitans win two games each in the 1919 Stanley Cup Final before the series, held at Seattle, is cancelled after all of the Montreal players contract Spanish flu

Events

- March 6 - Montreal Canadiens defeat Ottawa Senators in a best-of-seven series to win the National Hockey League championship.
- March 14 - Seattle Metropolitans defeat Vancouver Millionaires in a two-game playoff to win the 1919 PCHA season title.
- Allan Cup – Hamilton Tigers OHA)
- 1919 Memorial Cup - University of Toronto Schools wins the inaugural Memorial Cup for the Canadian national junior championship

== Multi-sport events ==
Far Eastern Championship Games

- Fourth Far Eastern Championship Games held in Manila, Philippine Islands

== Rowing ==
The Boat Race

- Oxford and Cambridge Boat Race – not contested due to World War I

== Rugby league ==
- 1919 Kangaroo tour of New Zealand

England

- It is not possible to resume national competitions in the 1918–19 season but county leagues and cups are arranged.
- Lancashire League Championship – Rochdale Hornets
- Yorkshire League Championship – Hull
- Lancashire County Cup – Rochdale Hornets 22–0 Oldham
- Yorkshire County Cup – Huddersfield 14–8 Dewsbury

Australia

- NSW Premiership – Balmain (outright winner)

== Rugby union ==
Five Nations Championship

- Five Nations Championship series is not contested due to World War I.
- An Inter-Services Championship is held in Great Britain between Allied Forces rugby teams. The tournament is won by the New Zealand Army team.

== Speed skating ==
Speed Skating World Championships

- not contested due to World War I

== Tennis ==
Australia

- Australian Men's Singles Championship – Algernon Kingscote (GB) defeats Eric Pockley (Australia) 6–4 6–0 6–3

England

- Wimbledon Men's Singles Championship – Gerald Patterson (Australia) defeats Norman Brookes (Australia) 6–3 7–5 6–2
- Wimbledon Women's Singles Championship – Suzanne Lenglen (France) defeats Dorothea Douglass Lambert Chambers (GB) 10–8 4–6 9–7

France

- French Men's Singles Championship – not contested due to World War I
- French Women's Singles Championship – not contested due to World War I

USA

- American Men's Singles Championship – Bill Johnston (USA) defeats Bill Tilden (USA) 6–4 6–4 6–3
- American Women's Singles Championship – Hazel Hotchkiss Wightman (USA) defeats Marion Zinderstein (USA) 6–1 6–2

Davis Cup

- 1919 International Lawn Tennis Challenge – Australasia 4–1 Great Britain at Double Bay Grounds (grass) Sydney, Australia
