= 1918–19 Montreal Canadiens season =

NHL hockey team season

1918–19 Montreal Canadiens
- League: 1st (1st half), 2nd (2nd half) NHL
- 1918–19 record: 7–3–0 (1st half), 3–5–0 (2nd half)
- Home record: 7–2–0
- Road record: 3–6–0
- Goals for: 88
- Goals against: 78

Team information
- General manager: George Kennedy
- Coach: Newsy Lalonde
- Captain: Newsy Lalonde
- Arena: Jubilee Rink

Team leaders
- Goals: Odie Cleghorn (23); Newsy Lalonde (23)
- Assists: Newsy Lalonde (9)
- Points: Newsy Lalonde (32)
- Penalty minutes: Joe Hall (130)
- Wins: Georges Vezina (10)
- Goals against average: Georges Vezina (4.27)

The 1918–19 Montreal Canadiens season was the team's tenth season and second as a member of the new National Hockey League (NHL). The Canadiens would win the NHL title and go to Seattle to face off for the Stanley Cup. However, a Spanish flu outbreak occurred in Seattle and both teams would abandon the series after several Canadiens fell ill. Montreal defenceman Joe Hall would die from the flu.

== Team business ==
Prior to the season, another attempt was made by Eddie Livingstone to revive the National Hockey Association. Livingstone did not wish to sell his team for less than $20,000, more than the Arena Company was willing to pay. On September 20, 1918, the NHA owners, including the Canadiens, voted to permanently suspend the NHA. Livingstone forced another meeting on December 11, 1918, hoping to get Canadiens' minority shareholder Brunswick to vote with him, but at the meeting, Brunswick officials affirmed their loyalty to the Canadiens and the meeting ended with the Canadiens, Brunswick, Ottawa and Wanderers simply leaving the meeting.

== Regular season ==
Georges Vezina came second in the league in goals against average of 4.3 per game. Odie Cleghorn returned to professional play and he had an outstanding 24 goals in 17 games to lead the league in goals for the Canadiens.

The Toronto Arenas folded on March 20, 1919, leaving only Montreal and Ottawa in the league. The teams proceeded to play off for the league title.

=== Finals ===
First half
	GP	W	L	T	Pts	GF	GA
**Montreal Canadiens**	10	7	3	0	14	57	50
Ottawa Senators	10	5	5	0	10	39	39
Toronto Arenas	10	3	7	0	6	42	49

Second half
	GP	W	L	T	Pts	GF	GA
**Ottawa Senators**	8	7	1	0	14	32	14
Montreal Canadiens	8	3	5	0	6	31	28
Toronto Arenas	8	2	6	0	4	22	43

Note: GP = Games Played, W = Wins, L = Losses, T = Ties, Pts = Points, GF = Goals For, GA = Goals Against
Teams that qualified for the playoffs are highlighted in bold.

=== Record vs. opponents ===
1918–19 NHL Records
Team	MTL	OTT	TOR
Montreal	—	4–5	6–3
Ottawa	5–4	—	7–2
Toronto	3–6	2–7	—

== Schedule and results ==
1918–19 regular season
First half

Game	Result	Date	Score	Opponent	Record
1	L	December 21, 1918	2–5	Ottawa Senators (1918–19)	0–1–0
2	W	December 23, 1918	4–3	@ Toronto Arenas (1918–19)	1–1–0
3	W	December 28, 1918	6–3	Toronto Arenas (1918–19)	2–1–0
4	L	January 2, 1919	2–7	@ Ottawa Senators (1918–19)	2–2–0
5	W	January 4, 1919	5–2	Ottawa Senators (1918–19)	3–2–0
6	W	January 7, 1919	7–6	@ Toronto Arenas (1918–19)	4–2–0
7	W	January 11, 1919	13–4	Toronto Arenas (1918–19)	5–2–0
8	W	January 16, 1919	10–6	@ Ottawa Senators (1918–19)	6–2–0
9	W	January 18, 1919	5–3	Ottawa Senators (1918–19)	7–2–0
10	L	January 21, 1919	3–11	@ Toronto Arenas (1918–19)	7–3–0

Second half

Game	Result	Date	Score	Opponent	Record
11	L	January 25, 1919	0–1	Ottawa Senators (1918–19)	0–1–0
12	L	January 30, 1919	2–3 OT	@ Ottawa Senators (1918–19)	0–2–0
13	W	February 1, 1919	10–0	Toronto Arenas (1918–19)	1–2–0
14	L	February 4, 1919	3–6	@ Toronto Arenas (1918–19)	1–3–0
15	W	February 8, 1919	4–3	Ottawa Senators (1918–19)	2–3–0
16	L	February 11, 1919	4–6	@ Toronto Arenas (1918–19)	2–4–0
17	L	February 13, 1919	0–7	@ Ottawa Senators (1918–19)	2–5–0
18	W	February 15, 1919	8–2	Toronto Arenas (1918–19)	3–5–0

Legend: Win (2 points) Loss (0 points) Tie (1 point)

== Playoffs ==
They went against Ottawa for the championship and won it 13 goals to 7, or 13–7.

=== Finals ===
Montreal Canadiens vs. Seattle Metropolitans

Date	Away	Score	Home	Score	Notes
March 19	Montreal Canadiens	0	Seattle Metropolitans	7	
March 22	Seattle Metropolitans	2	Montreal Canadiens	4	
March 24	Montreal Canadiens	2	Seattle Metropolitans	7	
March 26	Seattle Metropolitans	0	Montreal Canadiens	0	20:00 OT
March 30	Montreal Canadiens	4	Seattle Metropolitans	3	15:57 OT

Series ended 2–2–1 and no winner awarded – playoffs were curtailed due to the influenza epidemic

== Player statistics ==
=== Skaters ===
Note: GP = Games played, G = Goals, A = Assists, Pts = Points, PIM = Penalties in minutes

		Regular season					Playoffs
Player	#	GP	G	A	Pts	PIM	GP	G	A	Pts	PIM
Newsy Lalonde	4	17	23	10	33	42	10	17	1	18	18
Odie Cleghorn	6	18	21	6	27	33	10	8	1	9	9
Didier Pitre	5	17	14	4	18	15	10	2	6	8	6
Jack McDonald	10	17	8	4	12	9	10	1	4	5	6
Joe Malone	7	8	7	2	9	3	5	5	1	6	3
Joe Hall	3	16	7	2	9	135	10	0	0	0	26
Louis Berlinguette	8	18	5	4	9	12	10	1	3	4	9
Bert Corbeau	2	16	2	3	5	54	10	1	1	2	20
Billy Coutu	9	17	1	2	3	21	10	0	2	2	8
Amos Arbour	12	1	0	0	0	0	-	-	-	-	-
Billy Bell	11	1	0	0	0	0	-	-	-	-	-
Fred Doherty	11	2	0	0	0	0	-	-	-	-	-

=== Goaltenders ===
Note: GP = Games played; TOI = Time on ice (minutes); W = Wins; L = Losses; T = Ties; GA = Goals against; SO = Shutouts; GAA = Goals against average

		Regular season								Playoffs
Player	#	GP	TOI	W	L	T	GA	SO	GAA	GP	TOI	W	L	T	GA	SO	GAA
Georges Vezina	1	18	1117	10	8	0	78	1	4.19	10	636	6	3	1	37	1	3.49

== Awards and records ==
- NHL champions (O'Brien Cup not awarded)

== Transactions ==
- traded Tommy Smith to Ottawa for cash, November 28, 1918
- signed Odie Cleghorn as a free agent, December 9, 1918
- signed Fred Doherty as a free agent, December 13, 1918
- signed Amos Arbour as a free agent, January 23, 1919

== See also ==
- 1918–19 NHL season
- List of Stanley Cup champions
