= Paul Jacobs (ice hockey) =

Canadian ice hockey and lacrosse player

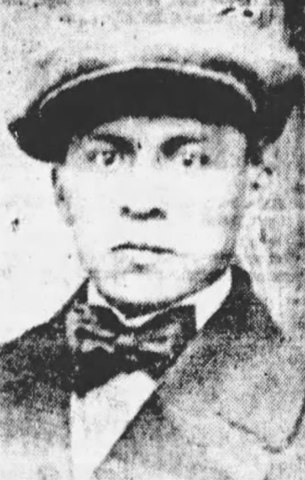
- Born: February 23, 1893; Montreal, Quebec, Canada
- Died: May 1, 1973 (aged 80); Kahnawake, Quebec, Canada
- Height: 5 ft 8 in (173 cm)
- Weight: 160 lb (73 kg; 11 st 6 lb)
- Position: Defence
- Shot: Left
- Played for: Toronto Arenas
- Playing career: 1912–1925

Paul Oronhyatekha Jacobs (February 23, 1893 – May 1, 1973) was a Canadian professional ice hockey and lacrosse player. Jacobs played one game in the National Hockey League (NHL) for the Toronto Arenas during the 1918–19 NHL season. Jacobs may have been the first aboriginal ice hockey player in the NHL.

== Playing career ==
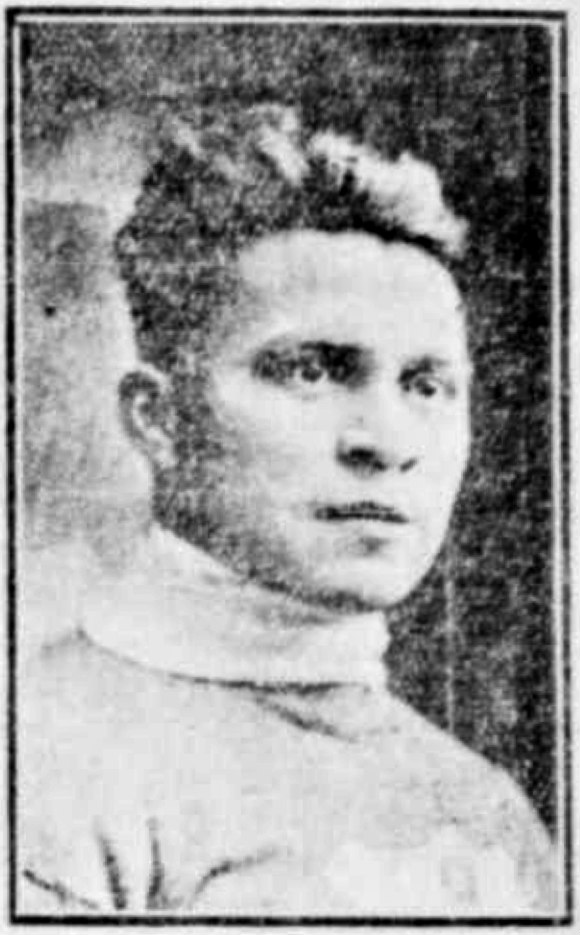
Jacobs c. 1922.

Jacobs was a resident of the Kahnawake Mohawk Territory, south of Montreal. Jacobs was proficient as a youth playing lacrosse. Photographs exist of Jacobs as a member of the reserve lacrosse team in 1910.

Jacobs was also proficient at ice hockey. He is first recorded on a hockey team with Dominion Bridge Company team in the 1912–13 season. Records exist for Jacobs playing for various teams from 1912 through 1916 and from 1917 through 1925, the last recorded team being the amateur Cleveland Ohio Blues of the USAHA.

Jacobs' record in the NHL is unclear. Jacobs was invited to the Toronto Arenas' training camp in December 1918. Jacobs potentially earned an opening-day roster spot but an announcement in the Toronto Globe indicated he was returning to the Montreal area instead. Jacobs played several games for the Montreal Stars of the Montreal Hockey League that season. Jacobs is recorded in referee reports for five games for Toronto between December 31 and February 4. However no newspaper reports list Jacobs as being in the lineup for any of those games. He may have been a substitute and did not play. Jacobs is recorded in an Ottawa paper for the opening-day December 23 game, but no other newspaper included Jacobs in the game report. An NHL report for the season records Jacobs as only participating in the December 31 game.

US census records for 1930 and 1940 list Jacobs as living in Detroit with his wife Alice.

== Career statistics ==
=== Regular season and playoffs ===
			Regular season					Playoffs
Season	Team	League	GP	G	A	Pts	PIM	GP	G	A	Pts	PIM
1912–13	Montreal Stars	MCHL	1	0	0	0	3	—	—	—	—	—
1912–13	Montreal Dominion Bridge	MTMHL	7	3	0	3	—	—	—	—	—	—
1913–14	Montreal Dominion Bridge	MTMHL	2	0	0	0	0	—	—	—	—	—
1914–15	Montreal Nationale	MCHL	1	0	0	0	3	—	—	—	—	—
1914–15	St. Lawrence Bridge	MTMHL	—	—	—	—	—	—	—	—	—	—
1915–16	New Haven Hockey Club	USAHA	—	—	—	—	—	—	—	—	—	—
1917–18	Montreal Stars	MCHL	9	10	1	11	15	—	—	—	—	—
1917–18	Leeside Indians	Exhib	—	—	—	—	—	—	—	—	—	—
1918–19	Toronto Arenas	NHL	1	0	0	0	0	—	—	—	—	—
1918–19	Montreal Stars	MCHL	7	4	7	11	27	—	—	—	—	—
1919–20	Laval University	MCHL	10	6	0	6	24	—	—	—	—	—
1921–22	Quebec Voltigeurs	QPHL	6	2	1	3	—	—	—	—	—	—
1922–23	Cleveland Indians	USAHA	16	0	0	0	—	—	—	—	—	—
1923–24	Montreal Nationale	ECHA	8	0	0	0	—	—	—	—	—	—
1924–25	Cleveland Blues	USAHA	9	0	0	0	—	—	—	—	—	—
NHL totals			1	0	0	0	0	—	—	—	—	—

== Transactions ==
- Signed as a free agent by the Toronto Arenas, December 15, 1918.

== See also ==
- List of players who played only one game in the NHL
