= Bert Lindsay =

Canadian ice hockey player (1881–1960)

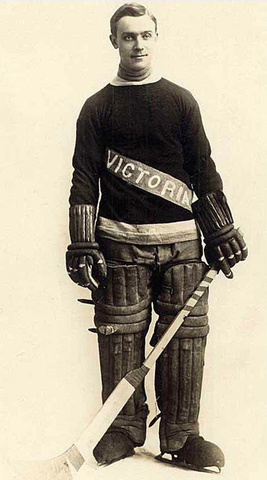
- Lindsay with the Victoria Aristocrats
- Born: July 23, 1881 West Garafraxa, Ontario, Canada
- Died: November 11, 1960 (aged 79) Sarnia, Ontario, Canada
- Height: 5 ft 7 in (170 cm)
- Weight: 160 lb (73 kg; 11 st 6 lb)
- Position: Goaltender
- Caught: Right
- Played for: Renfrew Creamery Kings; Victoria Aristocrats; Montreal Wanderers; Toronto Arenas
- Playing career: 1903–1919

Leslie Bertrand Lindsay (July 23, 1881 – November 11, 1960) was a Canadian professional ice hockey goaltender in the National Hockey Association (NHA), Pacific Coast Hockey Association (PCHA), and National Hockey League (NHL). Born in West Garafraxa, Ontario, Bert Lindsay was the father of Hockey Hall of Fame player Ted Lindsay.

== Playing career ==
Between 1903 and 1909 Lindsay played amateur hockey for many different teams, most notably with Renfrew in the Ottawa Valley Hockey League and the Federal Amateur Hockey League, and in 1907 and 1908 he won two consecutive Citizen Shield as Ottawa Valley champions with Renfrew.

Lindsay turned professional in 1910 and played two seasons for the Renfrew Millionaires in the NHA. When the team disbanded he moved west and joined the Victoria Aristocrats of the PCHA for three seasons before returning to the NHA with the Montreal Wanderers.

Lindsay stayed with the Wanderers when they joined the NHL in 1917, and was the first goalie in league history to earn a win, when his Wanderers defeated the Toronto Arenas 10-9 in the league's first game, in Montreal. After the Westmount Arena, the home arena of the Wanderers, burned down in January 1918, Lindsay was left without a team for the remainder of the season.

Lindsay signed with the Toronto Arenas for the 1918–19 NHL season and his career came to an end in the summer of 1919 after he broke both legs in a construction accident. Following his retirement from hockey, he relocated to Renfrew. He started a car dealership, later moving north to Kirkland Lake, Ontario during the Great Depression, where he worked in gold mining and raised a family, including his six sons and daughters, (June and Mae) —one of whom was Ted Lindsay.

== Career statistics ==
=== Regular season and playoffs ===
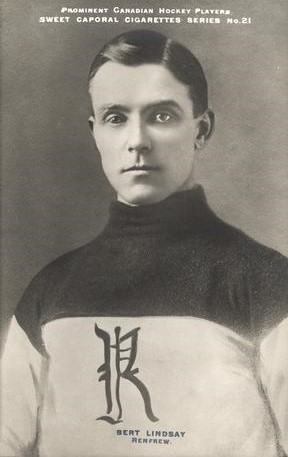
1911 postcard of Lindsay

			Regular season								Playoffs
Season	Team	League	GP	W	L	T	Min	GA	SO	GAA	GP	W	L	T	Min	GA	SO	GAA
1903–04	Guelph Nationals	OHA Int.	—	—	—	—	—	—	—	—	—	—	—	—	—	—	—	—
1904–05			—	—	—	—	—	—	—	—	—	—	—	—	—	—	—	—
1905–06	Toronto Argonauts	OHA Int.	1	1	0	0	60	4	0	4.00	—	—	—	—	—	—	—	—
1906–07	Renfrew Rivers	UOVHL	—	—	—	—	—	—	—	—	—	—	—	—	—	—	—	—
1906–07	Latchford Pros	TPHL	—	—	—	—	—	—	—	—	—	—	—	—	—	—	—	—
1907–08	Renfrew Creamery Kings	UOVHL	4	4	0	0	240	16	0	4.00	—	—	—	—	—	—	—	—
1907–08	Brockville Invincibles	FAHL	1	1	0	0	60	0	1	0.00	—	—	—	—	—	—	—	—
1908–09	Edmonton Professionals	Exhib.	3	3	0	0	180	10	0	3.33	2	1	1	0	120	13	0	6.50
1908–09	Strathcona Professionals	Exhib.	1	0	1	0	60	11	0	11.00	—	—	—	—	—	—	—	—
1908–09	Renfrew Creamery Kings	FAHL	6	6	0	0	360	35	0	4.17	—	—	—	—	—	—	—	—
1909–10	Renfrew Creamery Kings	NHA	1	0	1	0	60	11	0	11.00	—	—	—	—	—	—	—	—
1909–10	Renfrew Creamery Kings	NHA	12	8	3	1	730	54	0	4.44	—	—	—	—	—	—	—	—
1910–11	Renfrew Creamery Kings	NHA	16	8	8	0	960	101	0	6.31	—	—	—	—	—	—	—	—
1911–12	Victoria Aristocrats	PCHA	16	7	9	0	975	90	0	5.54	—	—	—	—	—	—	—	—
1912–13	Victoria Aristocrats	PCHA	15	10	5	0	927	56	1	3.62	—	—	—	—	—	—	—	—
1913–14	Victoria Aristocrats	PCHA	16	10	6	0	1005	80	0	4.78	3	0	3	0	195	13	0	4.00
1914–15	Victoria Aristocrats	PCHA	17	4	13	0	1054	116	0	6.60	—	—	—	—	—	—	—	—
1914–15	PCHA All-Stars	Exhib.	2	0	2	0	120	12	0	6.00	—	—	—	—	—	—	—	—
1915–16	Montreal Wanderers	NHA	23	10	13	0	1380	110	1	4.78	—	—	—	—	—	—	—	—
1916–17	Montreal Wanderers	NHA	15	3	12	0	879	95	0	6.48	—	—	—	—	—	—	—	—
1917–18	Montreal Wanderers	NHL	4	1	3	0	240	35	0	8.75	—	—	—	—	—	—	—	—
1918–19	Toronto Arenas	NHL	16	5	11	0	998	83	0	4.99	—	—	—	—	—	—	—	—
NHA totals			67	29	37	1	4009	371	1	5.55	—	—	—	—	—	—	—	—
PCHA totals			64	31	33	0	3961	342	1	5.18	3	0	3	0	195	13	0	4.00
NHL totals			20	6	14	0	1238	118	0	5.72	—	—	—	—	—	—	—	—
