= Fred Doherty =

Canadian ice hockey player

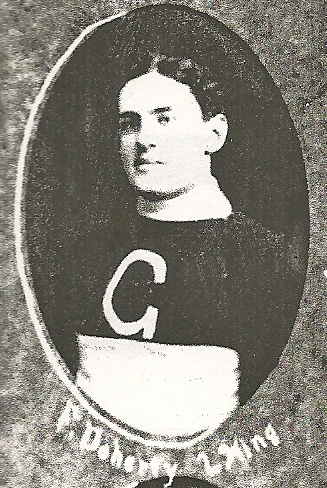
- Doherty with the Galt Professionals in 1911.
- Born: June 17, 1887 Westwood, Ontario, Canada
- Died: February 12, 1961 (aged 73) Montreal, Quebec, Canada
- Height: 5 ft 8 in (173 cm)
- Weight: 160 lb (73 kg; 11 st 6 lb)
- Position: Right wing
- Shot: Left
- Played for: Toronto Ontarios; Toronto Blueshirts; Montreal Wanderers; Montreal Canadiens
- Playing career: 1908–1919

Frederick "Doc" Doherty (June 17, 1887 – February 12, 1961) was a Canadian professional ice hockey player. Doherty played hockey for several professional ice hockey teams from 1908 until 1916, including a stint with the Toronto Ontarios in the National Hockey Association (NHA).

He also played in the Maritime Professional Hockey League and the Ontario Professional Hockey League. After returning from World War I duty, he played one game in the National Hockey League with the Montreal Canadiens to end his career. He played on several league champions, leading to play in several Stanley Cup championships, but was not a member of a Stanley Cup-winning team.

== Personal information ==
Doherty was born in Westwood, Ontario, in 1887 to John and Ellen (O'Grady) Doherty. Doherty married Rose Anna Sirois in 1915. He died in Montreal in 1961, survived by his wife, a brother and two sisters.

== Playing career ==
Doherty became a professional in the 1908–09 season, appearing in seven games with the Guelph Royals and ten games with the Galt Pros, both of the Ontario Professional Hockey League. He continued to play with Galt through the 1910–11 season. In January 1910, Galt traveled to Ottawa to play the Senators in a two-game, total-goal Stanley Cup challenge series, losing by an aggregate score of 15–4. Doherty appeared in both games, scoring a goal in game one. On March 13, 1911, the Pros returned to Ottawa for a one-game challenge match. The Senators prevailed 7–4. Doherty again scored one of Galt's goals.

Doherty also spent parts of the 1910–11 season with Belleville of the Eastern Ontario Professional Hockey League and the Renfrew Creamery Kings of the National Hockey Association. In 1911–12, he played in the Maritime Professional Hockey League with the Moncton Victorias, whose roster was made up largely of Galt players. In March 1912, this team played a two-game Stanley Cup series with Quebec, losing by a combined score of 17–3. Doherty did not score in either match.

He split 1912–13 between Moncton, the Halifax Crescents and the Toronto Blueshirts of the NHA. In 1913–14 he was with the Toronto Ontarios, followed by single games in each of the next two NHA campaigns, with Quebec and the Montreal Wanderers respectively. His final professional game was with the Canadiens, in 1918–19.

=== Career statistics ===
			Regular season					Playoffs
Season	Team	League	GP	G	A	Pts	PIM	GP	G	A	Pts	PIM
1908–09	Guelph Royals	OPHL	7	6	0	6	6	—	—	—	—	—
1908–09	Galt Professionals	OPHL	10	10	0	10	24	—	—	—	—	—
1909–10	Galt Professionals	OPHL	20	25	0	25	44	2	1	0	1	6
1910–11	Renfrew Creamery Kings	NHA	1	0	0	0	0	—	—	—	—	—
1910–11	Galt Professionals	OPHL	13	4	0	4	—	4	3	0	3	—
1911–12	Moncton Victorias	MPHL	16	16	0	16	31	2	0	0	0	2
1912–13	Toronto Blueshirts	NHA	1	0	0	0	0	—	—	—	—	—
1912–13	Moncton Victorias	MPHL	12	12	0	12	14	—	—	—	—	—
1912–13	Halifax Crescents	MPHL	1	0	0	0	0	—	—	—	—	—
1913–14	Toronto Ontarios	NHA	19	9	5	14	20	—	—	—	—	—
1914–15	Quebec Bulldogs	NHA	1	0	0	0	0	—	—	—	—	—
1915–16	Montreal Wanderers	NHA	1	0	0	0	0	—	—	—	—	—
1918–19	Montreal Canadiens	NHL	1	0	0	0	0	—	—	—	—	—
NHL totals			1	0	0	0	0	—	—	—	—	—
