= 1918–19 NHL season =

Professional ice hockey league season

- League: National Hockey League
- Sport: Ice hockey
- Duration: December 21, 1918 – March 6, 1919
- Games: 18
- Teams: 3

Regular season
- Top scorer: Newsy Lalonde (Canadiens)

League
- Champions: Montreal Canadiens
- Runners-up: Ottawa Senators

NHL seasons
- ← 1917–18 1919–20 →

The 1918–19 NHL season was the second season of the National Hockey League (NHL). While at first it was uncertain that the NHL would operate, and the possibility that National Hockey Association (NHA) would be resumed, the unfinished business of Eddie Livingstone's Toronto and Ottawa's NHA franchise, led to the NHL owners suspending the NHA again. Livingstone would attempt to overthrow the NHA management, and failing that, attempt to operate a rival league. The pre-season was filled with legal actions, deceptions and public verbal attacks. Ultimately, the NHL operated with three teams, in Montreal, Ottawa and Toronto. However, the season ended early with Toronto suspending operations, leaving Montreal and Ottawa to play off for the championship. Montreal would win the playoff and travel to Seattle for the Stanley Cup Final. However, the championship series was not completed due to influenza infecting the whole Montreal team and causing the eventual death of Montreal's Joe Hall.

== League business ==
The pre-season saw plenty of action off the ice. Toronto NHA owner Eddie Livingstone had found a partner in Percy Quinn, manager of the Toronto Arena Gardens, to take on the NHA/NHL owners. The two together tried to lease the ice time at the Toronto Arena Gardens, Ottawa Arena and Montreal Jubilee Rink from under the noses of the NHL owners, launched several lawsuits, attempted to launch a competing league and attempted to relaunch the NHA, but ultimately were unsuccessful. The NHA, while not operating, met three times.

=== Purchase of Quebec Bulldogs ===
The first action of Livingstone and Quinn was Quinn's attempt to purchase the Quebec Bulldogs, putting down a $600 down payment. At the time, Quinn's purchase was welcomed by the other NHA owners, thinking that they would gain an operating franchise. Quinn's action gave Quinn and Livingstone three votes at NHA meetings. Livingstone still had the voting shares of the Ontarios and Torontos NHA franchises.

=== Second suspension of NHA ===
On September 27, 1918, in Montreal, the NHA directors met again. Ottawa, Montreal Wanderers and Canadiens voted to again suspend operations of the league. This meant that the NHL would operate for a second season. Percy Quinn's purchase of the Quebec Bulldogs was approved but his franchise could not play. The action of the NHA directors led to Livingstone filing a lawsuit on October 1, 1918, charging that there was a conspiracy among the NHA owners, paid for by the Arena Company to suspend the NHA operations and asking the court to nullify the suspension.

On October 2, Quinn would meet with Ted Dey, owner of the Ottawa Arena and enter into an agreement to lease the Ottawa Arena. Dey accepted a check from Quinn, but did not cash it. He had plans of his own, involving the takeover of the Ottawa Senators, making it look to the Senators' management that they had no arena to play in. Rather than let the team fold, Martin Rosenthal entered into an agreement to sell the Senators to Dey.

=== Lawsuit against Arena Company ===
Since Toronto had won the Cup in 1917–18, a monkey wrench had been thrown into the other owners' scheme to get rid of Livingstone. His team was estimated now to be worth $20,000, and Livingstone demanded that. The Arena Company offered $7,000, but Livingstone instead sued the Arena and Charlie Querrie for $20,000. In the days following the filing of the lawsuit against Arena, Hubert Vearncombe, treasurer of the Toronto Arena Company, formed the separate Toronto Arena HC. This separated the hockey club from the Livingstone lawsuits, though the franchise still used Livingstone's players without permission.

Editorial from Montreal Telegraph, October 3, 1918

=== Attempt to launch CHA ===
A new threat to the NHL appeared. Livingstone, along with Quinn attempted to launch a competing Canadian Hockey Association (CHA). Quinn now planned to relocate the Quebec club to Toronto as the "Shamrocks". When news of the purchase reached Frank Calder president of both the NHA and NHL, he demanded that Quinn declare his intentions to be a member of the NHL or CHA. Calder publicly issued a November 11 deadline for Quinn to declare his intentions. Quinn did not meet it and Calder declared the Quebec franchise suspended for the season. On October 2, Quinn signed a lease agreement with Ted Dey of the Ottawa Arena to hold exclusive rights for pro hockey there. However, Dey double-crossed Quinn, not cashing his deposit cheque, and signing a five-year agreement with the NHL for the use of the facility. At the NHL meeting on November 9, 1918, the Toronto, Ottawa and Montreal teams signed an agreement to bind themselves to the NHL for a period of five years. This was at the instigation of the Ottawa club, which would not return to the NHL otherwise, and had the pending option with Percy Quinn to operate in the Canadian league.

The directors of the Arena Company of Montreal, owner of the Montreal and Toronto arenas, met and decided to shut out the CHA, against the wishes of Quinn, effectively ending the attempt to start up the CHA for the 1918–19 season. Despite the suspension, and the public threat, Quinn agreed to meet with Calder but reached no agreement. Calder publicly offered an olive branch to Quinn to join the NHL.

=== Dismissal of lawsuit against 228th ===
While this was going on, the NHA's suit to recover $3,500 from the Toronto 228th hockey team's insurer, the Ocean Accident and Guarantee Limited, was heard and dismissed. The NHA had sued the 228th for dropping out of the NHA in 1917. In his judgment, Judge Falconbridge noted that an insurance bond posted by the 228th could never have been enforceable, and that they had been ordered overseas under no fault of their own and that there was no clear legal status of the team, having played under the franchise of the non-operating Ontario Hockey Club.

=== Loss of lawsuit against Ottawa ===
A judgment went against Livingstone on November 20, 1918. Livingstone had claimed that Ottawa had interfered in the proper running of the NHA when the NHA had suspended the Toronto club in February 1917. The judge ruled that the NHA operated within its constitution, as no rules on how to operate less than six teams had been written.

=== Attempt to lease Montreal Jubilee Rink ===
In a related development, Livingstone entered into an agreement with the managers of the Jubilee Rink to lease it for pro hockey. The manager and lessee of the Jubilee Rink, Albert Allard signed the lease against the wishes of the owner of the Jubilee Rink, the Jubilee Rink Company. When the rink owners came to fire Allard and end his lease, the rink was closed by security, locking out the owners. Legal action came to a head on December 16 when Lucien Riopel won a court judgment expelling Allard.

=== Attempt to relaunch NHA ===
In December 1918, Livingstone and Quinn organized a league meeting of the old NHA, attempting to force the NHA to restart, based on Quinn and Livingstone's three votes and an attempt to disallow the vote of the Canadiens. Despite Calder labelling the meeting as "illegal", Ottawa, the Canadiens and Wanderers attended. However, the attempt proved futile as heated arguments broke out between Livingstone's side and the other owners. After the meeting, Livingstone and Quinn claimed that they now controlled the NHA. They claimed that the players were now the property of the NHA, stating that all players who had played in the previous season, "east of Port Arthur" had to report to the NHA. Calder now ordered all teams to pay the $200 legal fees owing. Separately, the Montreal and Ottawa NHA owners met and paid the fees owing to the league and Calder fined the Torontos, Ontarios and Quebec a further $200. Calder now publicly promised to file a court order to "wind up" the NHA organization. When the NHL decided to continue with play, Livingstone and Quinn threatened injunctions to stop the NHL from operating. However, the threats were not followed through on and the NHL season began on schedule.

=== Major rule changes ===
The penalty system was refined at the instigation of the Ottawa players:

- For minor fouls (holding a stick or lying on the ice to block a shot), a player would sit off for three minutes, allowing a substitute.
- For major fouls (including throwing a stick to prevent a score, tripping, holding, cross-checking, boarding) players would sit off for five minutes, with no substitute for three minutes. An automatic goal would be awarded in the event of the stick being thrown to prevent a score.
- For match fouls (defined as deliberately injuring or disabling a player), no substitutes were allowed for a minimum of five minutes. The player could not return for at least ten minutes, depending on the referee's ruling. The player would receive a fine of not less than $15. A second match foul in a season would lead to an automatic suspension and discipline by the league president.

Technical changes were also made to the league rules.

- Two lines were added to the ice, painted twenty feet from center, creating three playing zones. Forward passing and kicking the puck were permitted in the middle neutral zone.
- The NHL adopted the "Art Ross" puck instead of the "Spalding" puck.

=== Spanish Flu pandemic ===
The first hockey death from the influenza pandemic was Ottawa's Hamby Shore in October, 1918.

== Regular season ==
It had been anticipated that the end of World War I would release many veterans to join their old clubs, but very few were demobilized in time to do so. The regular season proceeded with three teams and a twenty-game split-season schedule. However, the second half of the season was cut short to eight games when the Arenas, playing poorly and with issues about breaking training, announced after seven games of the second half, it could not continue. Calder persuaded Vearncombe to play the 18th game and then the NHL season ended at 18 games. The Arena HC withdrew from the league on February 20, 1919, following financial difficulties.

Left with only two teams, the league had its first ever best-of-seven series to determine who would meet the Pacific Coast Hockey Association champions for the Stanley Cup.

=== Final standings ===
First half
	GP	W	L	T	Pts	GF	GA
**Montreal Canadiens**	10	7	3	0	14	57	50
Ottawa Senators	10	5	5	0	10	39	39
Toronto Arenas	10	3	7	0	6	42	49

Second half
	GP	W	L	T	Pts	GF	GA
**Ottawa Senators**	8	7	1	0	14	32	14
Montreal Canadiens	8	3	5	0	6	31	28
Toronto Arenas	8	2	6	0	4	22	43

Note: GP = Games Played, W = Wins, L = Losses, T = Ties, Pts = Points, GF = Goals For, GA = Goals Against
Teams that qualified for the playoffs are highlighted in bold.

== Playoffs ==
=== NHL Championship ===
With the NHL reduced to two teams eighteen games into its 20-game season, a decision was made to have the two remaining teams – coincidentally the two teams leading each half of the season – compete in a best-of-seven for the NHL championship, with the winner heading west to battle against the Pacific Coast Hockey Association champions. This was the second meeting between these two teams. Their only previous meeting came in the 1916–17 NHA season in a two-game total goals series which Montreal won 7–6. With Ottawa star Frank Nighbor missing most of the series due to a family bereavement, the Senators lost the first three games. With Nighbor back, the Senators won the fourth game in Ottawa 6–3, while Ottawa fans pelted Montreal's Bert Corbeau with lemons and vegetables because he had attacked the Senator's Jack Darragh. Montreal won the fifth game in Montreal to take the series four games to one and the right to face Seattle Metropolitans for the Stanley Cup. In 1921, when the NHA's dormant O'Brien Cup was reinstated by the NHL as an award to its league playoff champions, this 1919 championship was engraved on the O'Brien Cup.

Montreal Canadiens vs. Ottawa Senators
Date	Away	Score	Home	Score	Notes
February 22	Ottawa Senators	4	Montreal Canadiens	8	
February 27	Ottawa Senators	3	Montreal Canadiens	5	
March 1	Montreal Canadiens	6	Ottawa Senators	3	
March 3	Montreal Canadiens	3	Ottawa Senators	6	
March 6	Ottawa Senators	2	Montreal Canadiens	4	

Montreal wins best-of-seven series four games to one.

=== Stanley Cup Final ===
This was the second playoff meeting between the Montreal Canadiens and the Seattle Metropolitans. Their only previous meeting came in the 1917 Stanley Cup Final, which Seattle won in 4 games. With the series tied after five games (with one tie), the sixth game was slated for April 1, 1919, when the Spanish Flu epidemic forced the cancellation of the series. Several players on both sides were sick because of it, and it would eventually claim the life of Canadiens' forward Joe Hall five days later. Canadiens manager George Kennedy would not recover completely. This was the only time in history when the Stanley Cup was not awarded after the playoffs began.

Montreal Canadiens vs. Seattle Metropolitans
Date	Away	Score	Home	Score	Notes
March 19	Montreal Canadiens	0	Seattle Metropolitans	7	
March 22	Seattle Metropolitans	2	Montreal Canadiens	4	
March 24	Montreal Canadiens	2	Seattle Metropolitans	7	
March 26	Seattle Metropolitans	0	Montreal Canadiens	0	20:00 OT
March 29	Montreal Canadiens	4	Seattle Metropolitans	3	15:57 OT

Series ended 2–2–1 and no winner awarded – playoffs were curtailed due to the influenza epidemic.

== Awards ==
- NHL champion – Montreal Canadiens

Note:

The O'Brien Cup, still considered the championship of the NHA was not actually awarded in 1919. It remained under the care of the Canadiens who had won it in 1917, until the death of their owner, George Kennedy in 1921, when the NHL made arrangements to re-use the trophy. The Hockey Hall of Fame lists Montreal as the winner for 1918–19.

== Player statistics ==
=== Scoring leaders ===
Player	Team	GP	G	A	Pts	PIM
Newsy Lalonde	Montreal Canadiens	17	22	10	32	40
Odie Cleghorn	Montreal Canadiens	17	22	6	28	22
Frank Nighbor	Ottawa Senators	18	19	9	28	27
Cy Denneny	Ottawa Senators	18	18	4	22	28
Didier Pitre	Montreal Canadiens	17	14	5	19	12
Alf Skinner	Toronto Arenas	17	12	4	16	26
Reg Noble	Toronto Arenas	17	10	5	15	35
Harry Cameron	Ottawa Senators; Toronto Arenas	14	11	3	14	35
Jack Darragh	Ottawa Senators	14	11	3	14	33
Ken Randall	Toronto Arenas	14	8	6	14	27

=== Leading goaltenders ===
Name	Team	GP	Mins	W	L	T	GA	SO	GAA
Clint Benedict	Ottawa Senators	18	1152	12	6	0	53	2	2.76
Georges Vezina	Montreal Canadiens	18	1117	10	8	0	78	1	4.19
Hap Holmes	Toronto Arenas	2	120	0	2	0	9	0	4.50
Bert Lindsay	Toronto Arenas	16	998	5	11	0	83	0	4.99

Source: NHL

=== NHL playoff scoring leader ===
GP = Games Played, G = Goals, A = Assists, Pts = Points

Player	Team	GP	G	A	Pts
Newsy Lalonde	Montreal Canadiens	10	17	1	18

== Coaches ==
- Montreal Canadiens: Newsy Lalonde
- Ottawa Senators: Harry Hyland and Alf Smith
- Toronto St. Patricks: Frank Heffernan and Harvey Sproule

== Debuts ==
The following is a list of players of note who played their first NHL game in 1918–19 (listed with their first team, asterisk(*) marks debut in playoffs):

- Amos Arbour, Montreal Canadiens

The last remaining active player to kick off their NHL career this season was Punch Broadbent, who retired after the 1928–29 season.

== Last games ==
The following is a list of players of note that played their last game in the NHL in 1918–19 (listed with their last team):

- Joe Hall, Montreal Canadiens

== Free agency ==
Date	Players	Team
December 2, 1918	Rusty Crawford	Ottawa Senators
December 9, 1918	Odie Cleghorn	Montreal Canadiens
December 13, 1918	Fred Doherty	Montreal Canadiens
December 15, 1918	Paul Jacobs	Toronto Arenas
December 28, 1918	Bert Lindsay	Toronto Arenas
January 17, 1919	Dave Ritchie	Toronto Arenas
January 21, 1919	Punch Broadbent	Ottawa Senators
January 23, 1919	Amos Arbour	Montreal Canadiens
February 17, 1919	Skene Ronan	Ottawa Senators

== Transactions ==
November 28, 1918	To Ottawa Senators Tommy Smith	To Montreal Canadiens cash
December 9, 1918	To Ottawa Senators Skene Ronan	To Montreal Canadiens Harry Hyland
December 14, 1918	To Toronto Arenas Rusty Crawford	To Ottawa Senators future considerations

== See also ==
- List of Stanley Cup champions
- List of pre-NHL seasons
- 1918 in sports
- 1919 in sports

Preceded by 1917–18 NHL season	1918–19 NHL season 1918–19	Succeeded by 1919–20 NHL season
