= Toronto Arenas =

Former hockey team in NHL

- List of Toronto Arenas seasons
- Founded: 1917
- History: Toronto Hockey Club; 1917–1918; Toronto Arenas; 1918–1919; Toronto St. Patricks; 1919–1927; Toronto Maple Leafs; 1927–present
- Home arena: Arena Gardens
- City: Toronto, Ontario
- Team colours: Royal blue, white
- Owner(s): Toronto Arena Company 1917–18; Hubert Vearncombe 1918–19
- Stanley Cups: 1 (1918)

The Toronto Arenas or Torontos were a professional men's ice hockey team that played in the first two seasons of the National Hockey League (NHL). It was operated by the owner of the Arena Gardens, the Toronto Arena Company. As the ownership of the National Hockey Association (NHA) Toronto Blueshirts franchise was in dispute, the new NHL league was started, and a temporary Toronto franchise was operated. The NHL itself was intended to only be a one-year entity until the NHA could be reactivated, although it never was.

For the first season, 1917–18, the team operated without a formal organization separate from the Arena Company and without an official club nickname. However, the press would dub the team the "Blue Shirts" or "Torontos" as they had done with the NHA franchise. After the 1918–19 season, the Arena Company was granted a permanent franchise in the NHL, which evolved into today's Toronto Maple Leafs.

== History ==
=== 1917–18 season ===
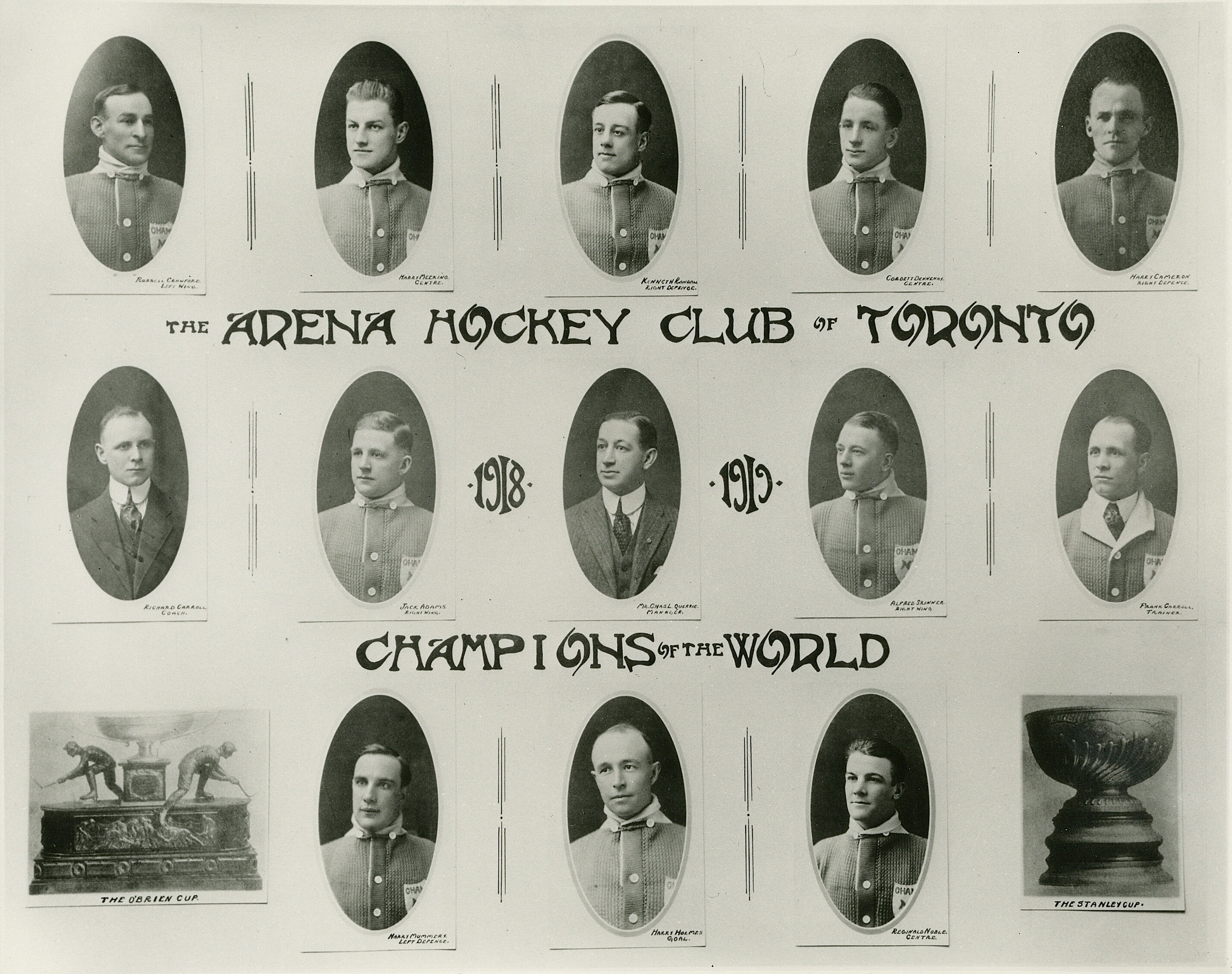
1917–18 season Toronto Arenas. Top row, from left: Rusty Crawford, Harry Meeking, Ken Randall, Corbett Denneny, Harry Cameron. Middle row, from left: Dick Carroll, Jack Adams, Charles Querrie, Alf Skinner, Frank Carroll. Bottom row, from left: Harry Mummery, Harry "Hap" Holmes, Reg Noble.

By the fall of 1917, a dispute between Eddie Livingstone, owner of the Blueshirts, and the owners of the NHA's other four clubs—the Montreal Canadiens, Montreal Wanderers, Ottawa Senators and Quebec Bulldogs had come to a boil. The other NHA owners were eager to disassociate themselves from Livingstone, but discovered that the NHA's constitution did not allow them to simply vote Livingstone out. With this in mind, on November 22 the NHA board of directors voted to suspend operations. At the same time, the other four NHA clubs voted to create a new league—the National Hockey League. However, they did not invite Livingstone to join them, effectively leaving him in a one-team league.

However, the other club owners felt it would be unthinkable not to have a team from Canada's second-largest city in the NHL. They also needed a fourth team to balance the schedule, since the Bulldogs were forced to suspend operations due to financial troubles (and, as it turned out, would not return until 1920). To solve the problem, NHL president Frank Calder assigned the contracts of the Blueshirt players to a 'temporary' Toronto franchise to be operated by the Toronto Arena Company, who also owned the Montreal Arena. Calder had ordered Livingstone to sell the team, but Livingstone turned down several offers. The Arena Company was given a year to resolve the dispute or lose the franchise. The Arena Company did agree to compensate Livingstone for the use of the players for the season, although no suitable figure was ever reached, and the league itself disputed any claims that Livingstone had on the players.

As the Arena Gardens was the only suitable place to play at the time, the players had little choice but to play for the Arena team, if they wanted to play in the NHL. The NHL had also publicly announced that there was an agreement to buy out Livingstone, though this never took place. The team did not have an official name, but since it was made up mostly of former Blue Shirts, the media and fans called them "the Torontos" or even "the Blue Shirts," as they had Livingstone's former team. Many of the players signed contracts with both Livingstone and the Torontos, and often were paid in cash or personal cheques on a week-by-week basis. Despite this uncertainty, the team was successful from the start under coach Dick Carroll and general manager Charlie Querrie. The team won the second half of the 1917–18 NHL season, leading to a playoff against the Montreal Canadiens. The Torontos won the playoff and would then face off against the Vancouver Millionaires for the Stanley Cup. Toronto then won the best-of-five series 3–2. After the Cup win, the team did not engrave its name on the Stanley Cup, as would later become the custom.

Unlike the other two NHL franchises with NHA roots, the Canadiens and the Senators, the Maple Leafs do not claim the Blue Shirts' history as their own, as the NHL was formed to remove Livingstone from the NHA and that franchise was folded. As such, pre-NHL Toronto could not be part of Maple Leafs history. They do, however, claim the history of the "temporary" Toronto franchise of 1917–18.

=== 1918–1919 season ===
In 1918, the NHA voted to suspend operations once again, and the other owners made plans to operate the NHL for a second season. Since the Torontos had won the Cup, even more revenue was at stake and Livingstone held out for $20,000, though the Arena offered $6,000. This led to Livingstone filing another lawsuit, this against the Arena owners. In response, instead of returning the players to Livingstone, or even paying Livingstone, the Arena Company returned their temporary franchise to the NHL and immediately formed a new club, the Toronto Arena Hockey Club, popularly known as the Toronto Arenas, with Arena Company auditor Hubert Vearncombe as president. The new club was a separate corporation that could exist separate from any legal action. This new team was readily admitted to the NHL as a member in good standing. (The Maple Leafs themselves say they were known as the Arenas during their first season, but the name "Arenas" was not recorded to commemorate the team's 1918 Cup victory until 1947.) They also decided that only NHL teams would be allowed to play at the Arena Gardens, effectively foreclosing Livingstone's efforts to resurrect the NHA.

To restate and clarify a somewhat confusing series of events: four of the five clubs that played in the NHA seceded to form the NHL in 1917. The players from the fifth club, the Blueshirts, were "leased" to the Arena Company and skated as a "temporary" Toronto NHL franchise in the league's inaugural season. After the Torontos won the Stanley Cup, the Arena Company was granted a permanent NHL franchise, but retained the former Blueshirts players. It is this franchise that began the lineage of today's Maple Leafs.

This year, the club was not successful, falling to 5 wins and 13 losses, finishing last in both halves of the season. Attendance was especially poor, recorded as only hundreds for a February 4, 1919 game against the Canadiens. Several players left the team, including Harry Holmes, Harry Meeking and Dave Ritchie. This was partly due to the legal status of the team; since most players were really still "property" of the Blueshirts, they didn't have formal contracts and were being paid under the table in cash.

The team wrote to Calder to end the season early, and the season ended after each team had played 18 games. The Toronto Arenas then officially withdrew from the league on February 20, 1919. This left the two remaining teams, Montreal and Ottawa, to play a playoff for the league championship.

=== 1919 sale and renaming ===
On December 13, 1919, the NHL approved the sale of the Arenas to a group fronted by Querrie, for the fee of $5,000. While the money was to go to Livingstone to compensate him for the loss of his NHA club, Livingstone never received the money. By all accounts, Calder pocketed the money himself. The team was renamed the Toronto St. Patricks. The incorporation date of the club was December 22, 1919. Querrie, Fred Hambly, Percy Hambly, and Paul Ciceri owned 99 shares each, while Richard Greer owned 4 shares.

The NHL uses the abbreviation TAN to distinguish player records of the Toronto Arenas from the subsequent St. Patricks (TSP) and Maple Leafs (TOR).

== Notable players ==
- Jack Adams – Hall of Fame player, later Detroit coach and general manager
- Hap Holmes – Hall of Fame goaltender
- Harry Cameron – Hall of Fame defenseman
- Reg Noble – Hall of Fame center
- Rusty Crawford – Hall of Fame left winger

== Coaches ==
- Dick Carroll

== See also ==
- Eddie Livingstone
- Toronto Maple Leafs
- Toronto St. Pats
- History of the National Hockey League
- History of the Toronto Maple Leafs
- List of Stanley Cup champions
- 1918 Stanley Cup Final

Preceded by Seattle Metropolitans; 1917	Toronto; Stanley Cup champions 1918	Succeeded by Ottawa Senators; 1920
