= Garnett (given name) =

Garnett is a given name. Notable people with the name include:

- Garnett Adrain (1815–1878), American politician from New Jersey
- Garnett Bankhead (1928–1991), American baseball player
- Garnett Blair (1921–1996), American baseball player
- Garnett Brown (1936–2021), American jazz musician
- Garnett Bruce (born 1967), American opera director
- Garnett Duncan (1800–1875), American politician from Kentucky
- Garnett Thomas Eisele (1923–2017), American judge from Arkansas
- Garnett Genuis (born 1987), Canadian politician
- Garnett Hollis (born 2002), American football player
- Garnett Kelly (1924–2017), American politician from Missouri
- Garnett H. Kelsoe (fl. 1990s), American immunologist and professor
- Garnett Kruger (born 1977), South African cricketer
- Garnett McMillan (1842–1875), American politician from Georgia
- Garnett Moore (1914–1984), American politician from Virginia
- Garnett Nelson (1873–1930), American educator and physician
- Garnett Norman (1900–1925), American baseball player
- Garnett Spears (2008–2014), victim of murder in New York
- Garnett Stackelberg (1910–2005), American journalist
- Garnett S. Stokes (born 1955), American educator
- Garnett Tarr (born 2000), South African cricketer
- Garnett Wikoff (1886–1959), American long-distance runner

== See also ==
- Garnett
- Garnet (name)
