= Garnet Hughes =

Major General Garnet Hughes CB CMG DSO
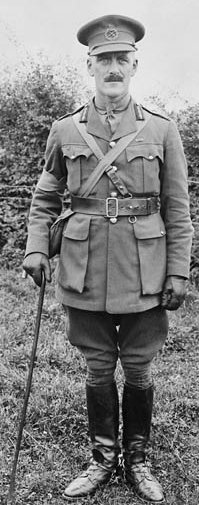
- Brigadier General Garnet Hughes, July 1916
- Born: 22 April 1880; Toronto, Ontario, Canada
- Died: 12 April 1937 (aged 56); Toronto, Ontario, Canada
- Relatives: Sam Hughes (father); Samuel Hughes (son)
- Military career
- Allegiance: Canada
- Branch: Canadian Expeditionary Force
- Service years: 1899–1920
- Rank: Major General
- Commands: 1st Canadian Division; 5th Canadian Division
- Conflicts: First World War: Second Battle of Ypres
- Awards: Companion of the Order of the Bath; Companion of the Order of St Michael and St George; Distinguished Service Order; Mentioned in Despatches
- Other work: Civil engineer

Major General Garnet Burk Hughes CB, CMG, DSO (22 April 1880 – 13 April 1937) was a Canadian military officer during the First World War. Although he had shown promise as a cadet officer and was politically well-connected, he was judged not to be an able combat officer and, in the latter half of the war, was shunted away from the front lines to administrative roles.

== Education and pre-war career ==
Garnet Hughes was born on Homewood Avenue in Toronto, the first son of Nellie Hughes (née Burk), and Sam Hughes, his name possibly in honour of General Sir Garnet Wolseley, leader of the Red River Expedition of 1870. In 1892, when Garnet was 12, his father was elected to the House of Commons; by 1911, Sam Hughes had risen to the post of Minister of Militia in the government of Sir Robert Borden.

Garnet entered the Royal Military College of Canada in Kingston, Ontario, taking the top entrance examination score. While there, he rose to battalion sergeant-major, and was awarded the gold medal, and the sword of honour. Upon graduation in 1901, he was placed on the Reserve of Officers as a Lieutenant of Engineers, and was offered a commission with the Royal Engineers at Woolwich, England. However, his father opposed this, so for some time he worked as an engineer for the Canadian Northern Railway, and later became Chief Engineer for the Dominion Department of Public Works on Vancouver Island. On arriving in Victoria, British Columbia, Hughes joined the Canadian militia as a part-time officer. He also met Elizabeth Irene Bayliss Newling and married her in 1910. The couple had one son, Samuel.

In 1913, Hughes, alongside his friend Lieutenant Colonel Arthur Currie, helped form the 50th Regiment (Gordon Highlanders) militia. They took the Militia Staff Course together, and on completion of this Currie was given command of the regiment, and Hughes was given a commission under him as major.

== First World War ==
=== Front-line officer ===
With the outbreak of war in 1914, Hughes's father offered to make Currie the commanding officer of the 2nd Brigade in the 1st Division of the Canadian Expeditionary Force. However, Currie was considering staying behind in Victoria to take care of some financial problems and only accepted the post at the urging of Hughes. Hughes himself was promoted to colonel and appointed to be brigade-major of the 3rd Brigade under Brigadier-General Richard Turner.

The 1st Division spent the winter of 1914–15 training in England, and was sent to France in February 1915. After a period of indoctrination about the realities of trench warfare, the Canadians took control of a section of trench in the Ypres Salient on April 17, 1915. Only five days later, on Hughes' 35th birthday, the Germans used poison gas for the first time on the Western Front, sending clouds of chlorine wafting over the Allied trenches. French colonial troops on the Canadians' left flank broke, leaving an enormous hole in the Allied line.

In the chaos that followed, both Turner and Hughes panicked and sent erroneous messages back to divisional headquarters that their line had been broken and was in full retreat, when in fact the 3rd Brigade had not even been attacked yet. Late in the evening, they ignored a message from Currie suggesting that two reserve units (the 10th and 16th Battalions) should be used to fill the hole in the Allied line. Instead, Turner and Hughes sent the soldiers on a night-time attack against a German strongpoint at Kitcheners' Wood.

Hughes came forward to order the attack, but rather than waiting for proper reconnaissance and supporting artillery pieces, he merely pointed in the direction that the battalion should take and sent them marching forward at 11:48 p.m., shoulder-to-shoulder, illuminated by bright moonlight, while Hughes retired to brigade headquarters. The lack of reconnaissance proved to be deadly; in breaking through a fence while still several hundred metres from their objective, the Canadians were detected, and enfilading machine gun fire caused 75 percent casualties before the soldiers reached the Wood and drove the Germans out. Among the mortally wounded was Lieutenant-Colonel Russell Lambert Boyle, the commander of the 10th. Back in the rear, Hughes had lost touch with the attack and it took hours until communications were re-established. With no reinforcements being sent forward, the Canadians could not hold their position and the survivors were forced to retreat the next day in the face of determined German counterattacks.

In light of Hughes's actions during the battle, Currie considered him to be incompetent under fire, and a danger to the men under his command. After Currie was promoted to command of the entire Canadian Corps, he refused to promote Hughes to a divisional command of his own, even though the request came from Hughes's father Sam Hughes, the Minister of Militia and Defence.

=== Administrative posts ===
Hughes was promoted to the temporary rank of brigadier general in November 1915 and succeeded Malcolm Mercer as commander of the 1st Canadian Infantry Brigade. He was eventually given command of the newly formed 5th Canadian Division, but it was an administrative post only, since the division was broken up as soon as it reached England. Its men were sent as reinforcements to replace battle losses in the four other divisions of the Canadian Corps. The 5th Division adopted a coloured formation patch identical in design to that worn by the four combatant divisions of the Canadian Corps. The colour selected for the patch was garnet, in recognition of Hughes' command of the division.

With the resignation from the Canadian cabinet of his father and champion, Hughes was assigned to an obscure, non-combatant administrative post in command of the defences of London, then in 1917, was appointed as Managing Director of the British Cellulose and Chemical Manufacturing Co in England, a position he held until 1920.

== Post-war and death ==
After the war, Hughes worked in industrial engineering in Canada, England, Greece and Mexico. In 1922, while working in England, he was found guilty of driving while intoxicated and fined 40 shillings plus 10 guineas costs.

Hughes died in Toronto at the age of 56 of peritonitis due to appendicitis. He is buried in Lindsay, Ontario.
