= Garnet (name) =

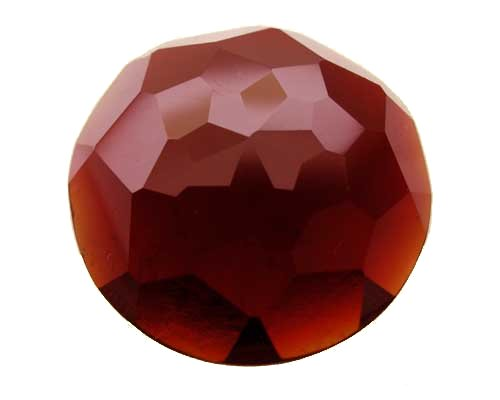
- The name Garnet takes its name from the gemstone garnet.
- Gender: Unisex

Origin
- Origin: Old English
- Meaning: "garnet"

Garnet is a name of Middle English origin, derived from the dark red gemstone, which was in turn named for the pomegranate that the garnet crystals resemble. The surname Garnett has multiple origins. It could come from an Old English occupational surname referring to a seller of hinges, be derived from Guarin, a Norman French version of the German name Warin, meaning to ward off or an occupational name referring to someone who grows or sells pomegranates. It might have been used for boys as a given name in reference to Garnet Wolseley, a British field marshal. As a name for girls, it was likely used in reference to the gemstone. Other gemstone names came into fashion for girls in the 1800s and early 1900s. It is both a surname and a given name.

Garnet was among the top 1,000 names for girls in the United States between 1884 and 1944. It was most popular in 1911, when it was the 376th most popular given name for American girls. It was in occasional use for boys in the United States between 1882 and 1925. It was most popular in 1904, when it was 593rd most popular name for American boys. The name has not appeared among the top 1,000 names for boys or girls since 1944 in the United States.

== People ==
=== Surname ===
- Eldon Garnet (born 1946), Canadian artist
- Henry Garnet (1555–1606), English Jesuit
- Henry Highland Garnet (1815–1882), African-American abolitionist
- John Roslyn Garnet (1906–1998), Australian biochemist and naturalist
- Sarah J. Garnet (1883–1911), African-American educator
- Thomas Garnet (1575–1608), English Jesuit priest

=== First name ===
- Garnet Ault (1905–1993), Canadian swimmer
- Garnet Bailey (1946–2001), Canadian ice hockey player
- Garnet Baltimore (1859–1946), African-American engineer
- Garnet Bloomfield (1929–2018), Canadian politician
- Garnet Bougoure (1923–2008), Australian jockey
- Garnet Brown (1930–2010), Canadian businessman
- Garnet Campbell (1903–1971), former Australian rules footballer
- Garnet H. Carroll (1902–1964), Australian theatre producer
- Garnet Clark (1917–1938), American jazz pianist
- Garnet Coleman (1961–2026), American politician
- Garnet Coulter (1882–1975), Canadian politician
- Garnet Exelby (born 1981), Canadian ice hockey player
- Garnet Hathaway (1991) American ice hockey player
- Garnet Hughes (1880–1937), Canadian military officer
- Garnet Jex (1895–1979), American artist and historian
- Garnet Kearney (1884–1971), Canadian doctor
- Garnet Lee (1887–1978), English cricketer
- Garnet Mackley (1883–1986), New Zealand businessman and politician
- Garnet Malley (1892–1961), Australia WWI flying ace
- Garnet Mimms (born 1933), American singer
- Garnet Richardson (1933-2016), former Canadian curler
- Garnet Rogers (born 1955), Canadian musician
- Garnet Walch (1843–1913), Australian writer
- Garnet Wolseley, 1st Viscount Wolseley (1833–1913), British Army officer

== See also ==
- Garnet (disambiguation)
- Garnett (disambiguation)
