= Central Memorial Park =

Park in Calgary, Alberta, Canada

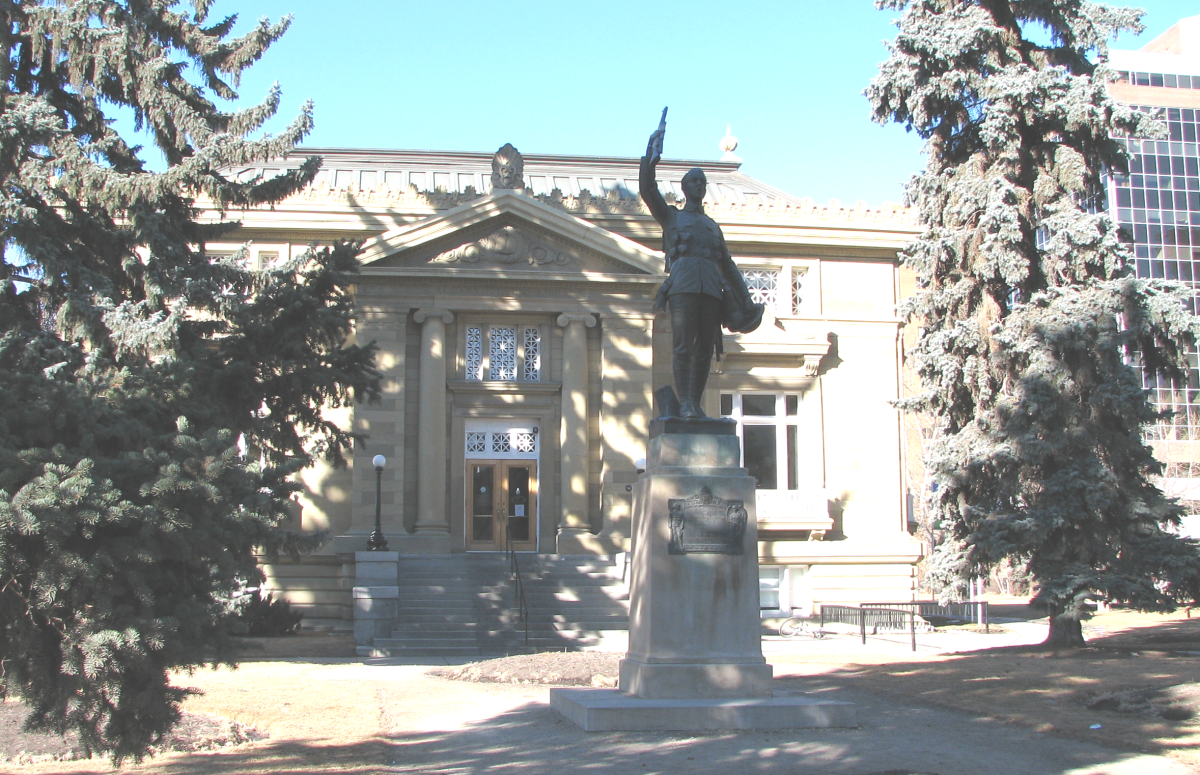
- Memorial Park Library
- Interactive map of Central Memorial Park
- Location: Beltline, Calgary
- Coordinates: 51.04113°N 114.07081°W
- Area: 4.68 acres (0.0189 km^{2})
- Created: 1889
- Operator: City of Calgary

National Historic Site of Canada
- Official name: Central Memorial Park and Library National Historic Site
- Designated: 2018-01-12

Central Memorial Park is in central Calgary's Beltline district. Sometimes referred to as Central Park or as Memorial Park, the area is home to the Memorial Park Library, an equestrian statue of Russell Lambert Boyle, and a cenotaph. The former Colonel Belcher Veterans Hospital was located across 4th street SW to the west, now the site of the Sheldon M. Chumir Centre. The Memorial Park Library and the surrounding park were named a National historic site in 2018

== History ==
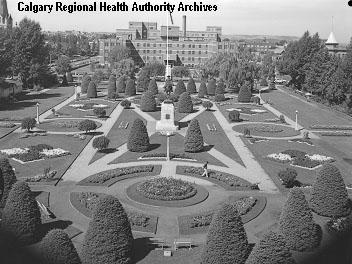
Central Memorial Park in Calgary with the Colonel Belcher Hospital in the background

The park occupies one entire city block between 12th and 13th Avenues SW, bounded by 2nd and 4th Streets. Totalling 4.68 acres (18,900 m^{2}), the park was designed in 1889 and landscaped in Victorian style.

The park went through a major revitalization in 2008–2009 at a cost of $11.5 million, and the renovated park was re-opened in May 2010.

Standing on the steps of Sacred Heart Church, Hébert spotted Eneas McCormick, then in his early twenties, and thought he would make a good model for the statue. The bronze statue has him sitting astride what was rancher Pat Burns's own pony. The statue is one and a half times life size, and has been described as one of the four finest equestrian statues in the world.

== Monuments ==
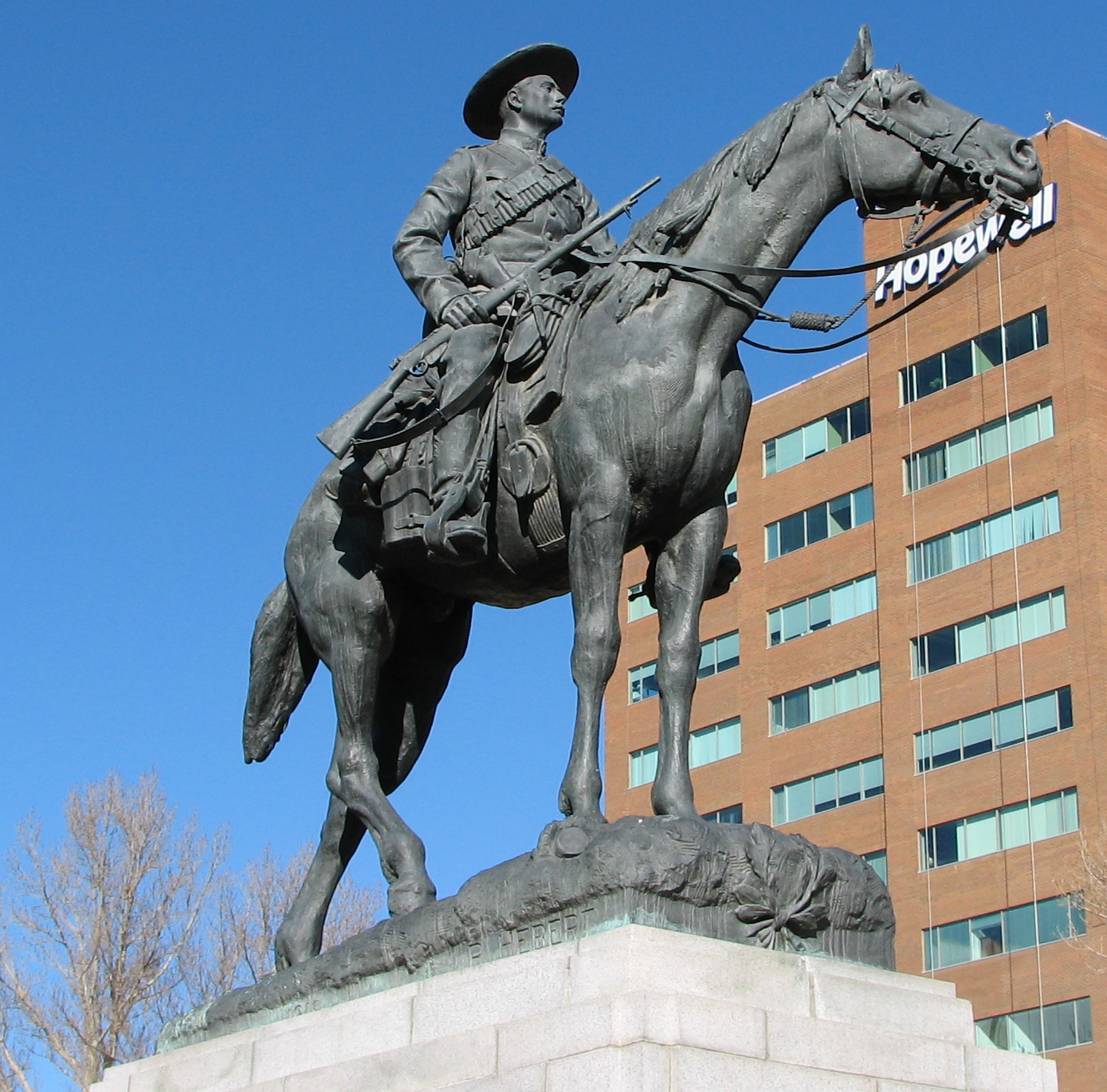
Boer War monument in Central Memorial Park.

The sculptor was Louis Philippe Hébert, who also did the Indian family grouping in front of the Legislature in Quebec City. The death of an English soldier in Calgary led to the creation of the South African War Memorial. Quebec sculptor, Louis Phillipe Hébert, was visiting his cousins, the Miquelon family in Calgary, at the turn of the century when they came upon the body of a soldier in a ditch in the Killarney area. It seems he had died from lead poisoning and no one had known about his illness. Members of the Calgary-based Lord Strathcona Horse Regiment who had fought in the South African Boer War (1899 - 1902) took up a collection and efforts were made to trace his family in England. It was decided that the men who fought in the war should be commemorated and Hébert said, "I'll put up a statue taller than your trees." Further funds were raised and Hébert was commissioned to create a statue in 1911. It was unveiled in 1914.

Standing on the steps of Sacred Heart Church, Hébert spotted Eneas McCormick, then in his early twenties, and thought he would make a good model for the statue. The bronze statue has him sitting astride what was rancher Pat Burns's own pony. The statue is one and a half times life size, and has been described as one of the four finest equestrian statues in the world. (R. L. Boyle was known for his contributions at Ypres, several years after the Second Boer War. Russell Lambert Boyle, was born on October 29, 1880. Although Colonel Boyle served in South Africa as a Sergeant, he is better known for his courageous exploits during the Second Battle of Ypres, where he led the 10th Battalion, CEF in its first action at Kitchener's Wood. He died of wounds on April 25, 1915.)

The statue of R.L. Boyle is unusual in that his name is not inscribed on the monument. Rather than memorializing him personally, the statue is intended as a tribute to all Albertans who fought in the Second Boer War, and the dates 1899-1902 are inscribed on the pedestal.

The Cenotaph was formally dedicated and unveiled by the Lieutenant Governor of Alberta, His Honour Dr. W. G. Egbert, on November 11, 1928. The Calgary Herald estimated the crowd at this event to be 10,000 with at least 75 wreaths laid. In addition, a pair of granite benches accompanied the Cenotaph. The bench on the south side was inscribed "May we live as nobly as they died" while the north bench's inscription was: "Pass not in sorrow, but with pride."

There is also a statue outside the Memorial Park branch of the Calgary Public Library at the park's eastern end of a First World War era soldier, erected by the Imperial Order Daughters of the Empire after the war.

== Activities ==
An annual, civic, wreath laying commemorating Remembrance Day occurs each November 11 with The Calgary Highlanders (10th Canadians) conducting a unit parade and ceremony of remembrance at which many organizations and civilians pay their respects.

ANZAC Day is commemorated annually each April at the cenotaph.

Since January 2017, Calgary's international literary festival Wordfest has operated from the library's second floor, and the organization runs author events from there and other locations.

SHAW PRIDE celebrates Pride with commissioned artists from 2SLGBTQ+, BIPOC, and ally communities. The murals are unveiled every August (since 2020) and sit in separate corners of Central Memorial Park, connected by a rainbow sidewalk.

During the COVID-19 pandemic, the park became a gathering place for protests against vaccine mandates and other public health measures.
