= Beltline, Calgary =

Beltline
- Community
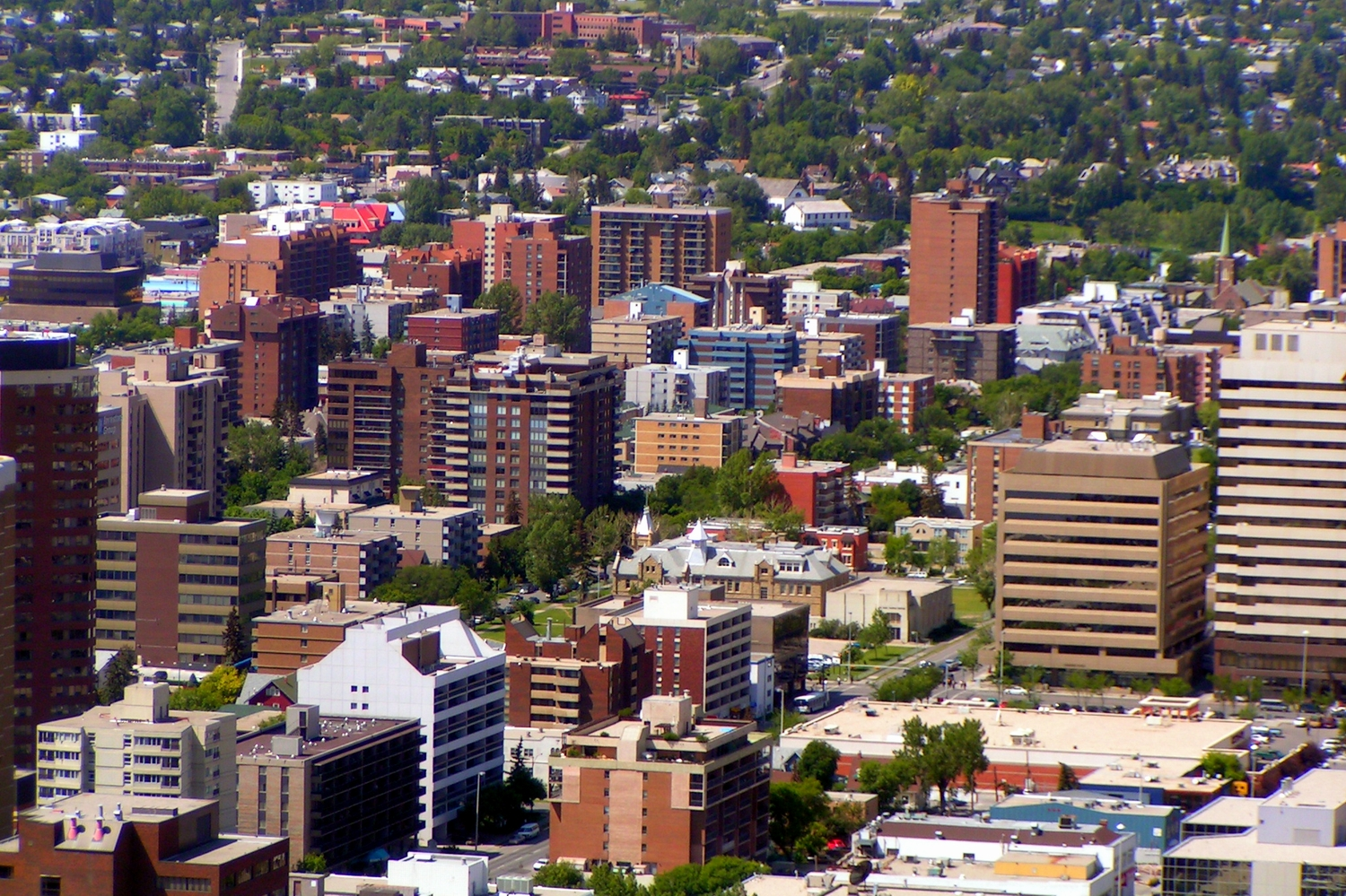
- The high density residential buildings in the Beltline district

- Location of Beltline in Calgary
- Coordinates: 51°02′23″N 114°04′17″W
- Country: Canada
- Province: Alberta
- City: Calgary
- Quadrant: SW
- Ward: 8
- Established: 1905 (Connaught)
- 2003 (Merged)

Government
  - Mayor: Jeromy Farkas
  - Administrative body: Calgary City Council
  - Councillor: Nathaniel Schmidt (Independent)

Area
  - Total: 2.9 km^{2} (1.1 sq mi)
- Elevation: 1,050 m (3,440 ft)

Population (2018)
  - Total: 24,887
  - Density: 8,580/km^{2} (22,200/sq mi)
- Postal code: T3C, T2R
- Website: www.beltlineyyc.ca

Beltline is a community in central Calgary, Alberta, Canada. The area is located immediately to the south of Calgary's downtown (south of the Canadian Pacific Railway tracks), and is sometimes considered part of downtown. The neighbourhood's boundaries are roughly 14th St SW to the Elbow River, and 17th Ave SW to 9th Ave SW. Beltline is one of Calgary's most densely populated neighbourhoods as well as the most urban, featuring many apartments, condominiums and offices. It has the reputation of being one of Calgary's primary areas for eclectic night-life, restaurants and urban culture.

The first established district in the neighbourhood was Connaught in 1905, followed by Victoria Park in 1914. When the region and its redevelopment plan were formally established in 2003, it amalgamated the inner city neighbourhoods of Victoria Park and Connaught. The community is named for an early 20th-century streetcar route. As of April 2018, there were 24,887 people residing in Beltline.

The Calgary Fire Department serves Beltline from Fire Station No. 2 at 1010 10 Avenue S.W.

== Districts ==
The City of Calgary recognizes four smaller districts in Beltline community: West Connaught, Connaught Centre, Victoria Park and East Victoria Park. They are areas of equal north-south orientation and divided by 8 Street SW, 4 Street SW, Macleod Trail (1 Street SE) and the Elbow River.

Beltline contains a number of less formal city districts within its boundaries. These include Midtown, the Design District, Victoria Park Business Revitalization Zone (Victoria), the 4th Street BRZ (located mostly within Mission), the Uptown 17th BRZ, the Warehouse District, and a portion of the Rivers District.

=== 17th Avenue ===
17th Avenue, which is on the southern extremity of Beltline, is a mixed-use area with a dense concentration of bars, restaurants, nightclubs, and shops. Behind this commercial development are residential areas. The street continues through the Stampede Grounds on its east side and is thus central to the party-like atmosphere that overtakes the city during the Calgary Stampede festival. 17th Avenue was nicknamed the "Red Mile" in 2004 during the playoff run of Calgary's NHL team, the Calgary Flames. During this time, it was not uncommon to see over 100,000 fans crowding the street and its bars and pubs on game nights.

==== Connaught ====
Connaught was established in 1905, and comprises the western part of Beltline, west of 4th Street W. Residents in this community had a median household income of $38,960 in 2000, and 26.1% of residents living in the neighbourhood were low-income.

==== Victoria Park ====
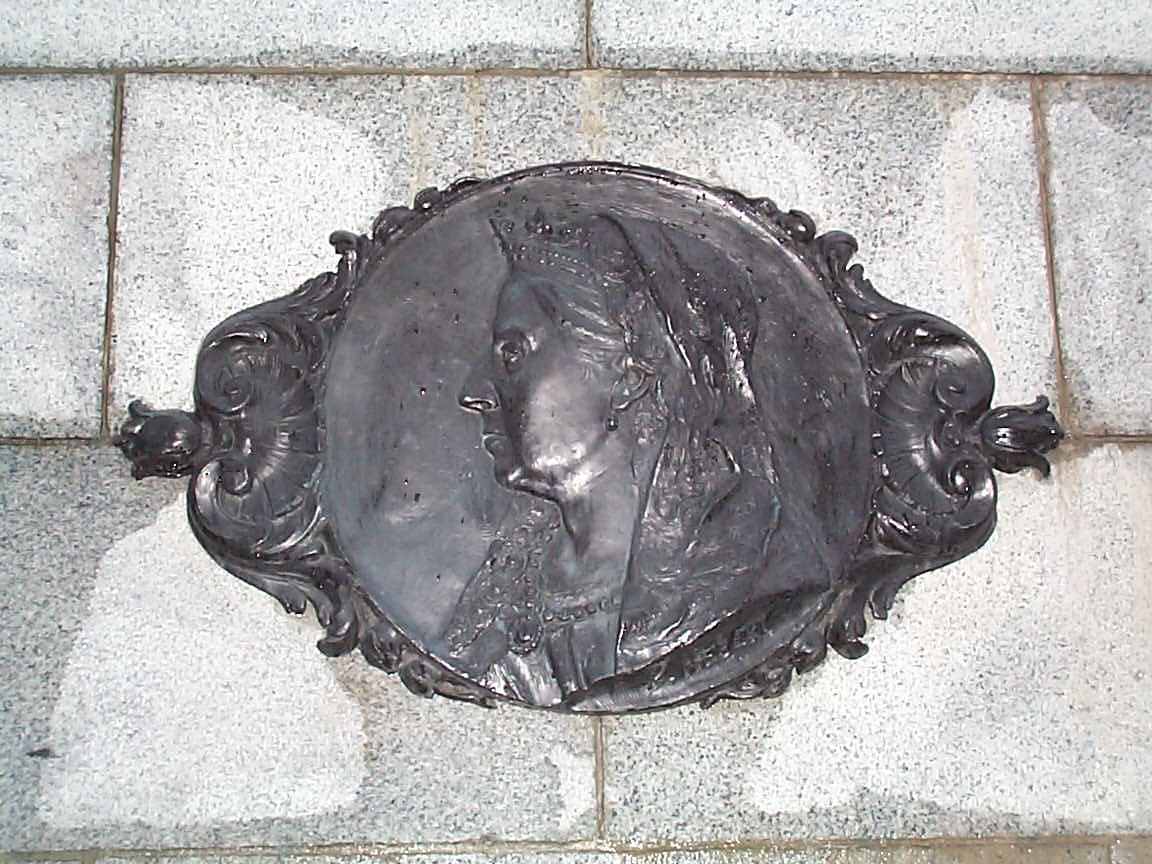
Queen Victoria pictured in the monument to the Second Boer War at Central Memorial Park.

Victoria Park comprises the eastern part of Beltline, is bisected by Macleod Trail, and contains the Warehouse district. It was named after Queen Victoria, who is celebrated in a monument to the Second Boer War located in Central Memorial Park. Victoria Park is adjacent to the Stampede Grounds and the Scotiabank Saddledome arena. Residents in this community had a median household income of $28,843 in 2000, and there were 34.2% low income residents living in the neighbourhood.

== Demographics ==
In the City of Calgary's 2018 municipal census, Beltline had a population of 24,887 living in 18,029 dwellings, an increase of 1,668 residents from its 2017 population of 23,219. With a land area of 2.9 km^{2} (1.1 sq mi), it had a population density of 8,580/km^{2} (22,200/sq mi) in 2018. This made Beltline the fastest growing neighbourhood in 2018. Beltline is one of the densest populated areas in the city, however due to significant undeveloped land in its Victoria Park region, the overall density figure tends to underrepresent the actual density of the developed regions.

== Crime ==
The Beltline is a mixed-income community with a large divide between the eastern and western portions of the community. The former community of Victoria Park was one of the worst Calgary communities for crime prior to being merged into the Beltline in 2003, and likely would be such if it was classified as its own community currently.

Crime Data
Year	Crime Rate (/100 pop.)
2018	6.7
2019	8.8
2020	6.3
2021	5.6
2022	5.1
2023	5.0

== Redevelopment ==
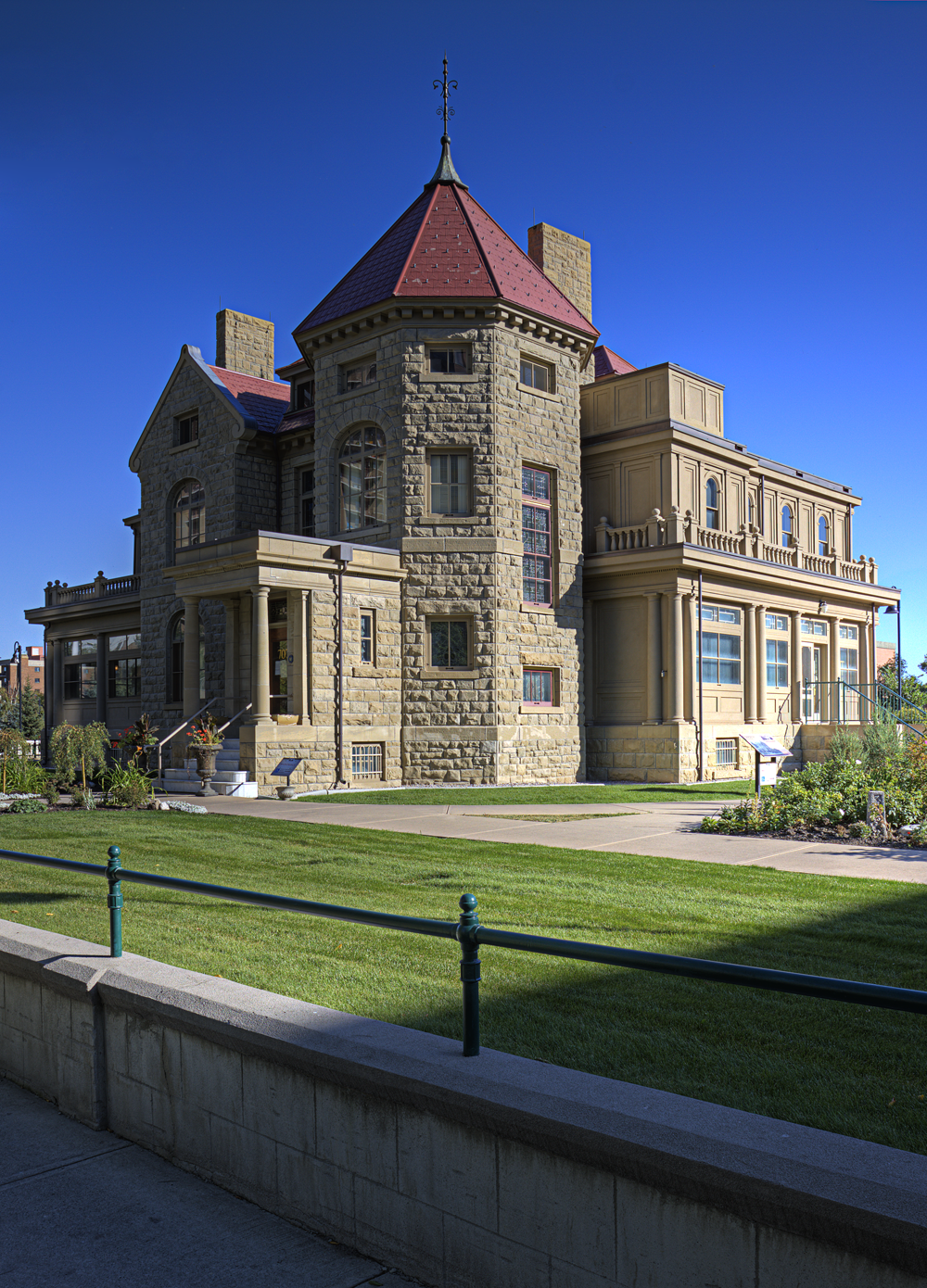
Lougheed House a National Historic Site of Canada.

Beltline is a neighbourhood in transition. The district, along with the Rivers District and the Downtown East Village, are presently in the midst of an ambitious urban planning and rejuvenation venture planned by the city's municipal government to increase the residential density of central Calgary. On May 15, 2006 the Calgary City Council approved the Beltline Area Redevelopment Plan. The plan details land use policies and implementation recommendations which are designed to be implemented concurrently with the broader Land Use Bylaw redesign. It aims to accommodate up to 40,000 residents in the neighbourhood by 2035, intending on hosting a range of residential and commercial uses. As of 2021, the area is home to 25,880 residents.

The city's efforts to revitalize Beltline have resulted in an intense level of urban redevelopment from the early 2010s onwards, with both the Connaught and Victoria Park sides of Beltline seeing numerous mid- and high-rise residential projects, many of which branding themselves as luxury or higher-end. Large concentrations have emerged along the Macleod Trail corridor adjacent to Victoria Park-Stampede LRT station in East Victoria Park, in the vicinity of Central Memorial Park on the 4 Street corridor in Victoria Park and Connaught Central, and across Lower Mount Royal, Connaught West and spilling into Sunalta. Key projects have included Upten, Keynote, BLVD Beltline, Guardian, Arriva, Nuera, Vetro/Sasso, Colours, Underwood, and The District at Beltline on the Victoria Park side, and Park Central, The Oliver, SODO/Residence Inn, Fourth Street Lofts, Mark on 10th, Versus, Aura/Arch, Eleven, The Royal and Stella on the Connaught side. Many of these developments include multiple towers, and most are somewhere between 25 and 40 storeys.

Many further residential projects are underway as of 2026, including the three-tower Broadway on 17th, Beltline Block on the site of the former Transalta headquarters, Lincoln, Imperia, and 1405 4 St. With Calgary also dealing with a high office vacancy rate, Beltline has joined the Downtown Commercial Core in being home to a number of office-to-residential conversions, with several older and underutilized office buildings being renovated and converted into homes.

In 2024, a major expansion of the Stampede Park's BMO Centre opened, creating Western Canada's largest convention facility. That same year, groundbreaking commenced on Scotia Place, set to replace the aging Scotiabank Saddledome as home of the Calgary Flames. These projects, among others, have contributed to the commercial growth of the neighbourhood, particularly in the hotel sector, as Calgary has faced a significant shortage of hotel rooms only exacerbated by the expanded BMO Centre. In 2025, a two-tower complex home to two Marriott Hotels brand hotels (a JW Marriott and a W Hotel) as well as 750 residences was proposed on a lot adjacent to Stampede Park. At 62 and 69 storeys, the taller of the two would be the tallest building in Alberta and one of the tallest outside of the Toronto area. At least three other hotels are proposed or under construction in the surrounding area, including a to-be-named Marriott Autograph Collection hotel currently under construction immediately south of the BMO Centre, and Calgary's second Fairmont Hotels property.

In 2020, city council approved construction of the Calgary Green Line, which would have two subway style stations in the Beltine: Centre Street S station and 4 Street SE station and initially planned to be entirely underground through the Beltline in a tunnel under 11 Avenue S. In 2024, however, the plan was modified to only construct the core section of the line and to drop the Centre St station due to rising project costs. As a result, the Alberta Government pulled its support for the underground alignment under downtown Calgary, throwing the entire project into uncertainty. Since then, it has been determined the southeastern segment of the line will be built first and temporarily terminate at the proposed Grand Central - Events Centre intercity rail station at the far eastern end of the Beltline while a downtown alignment is determined. The provincial government's new preferred alignment sees the line elevated down 10 Ave and turning north at 2 St, however this has drawn criticism from many groups including the Beltline Neighbourhoods Association for the greater impact it would have on the neighbourhood. The proposed cheaper alignment would likely, however, restore the shelved Centre St station.

== Education ==
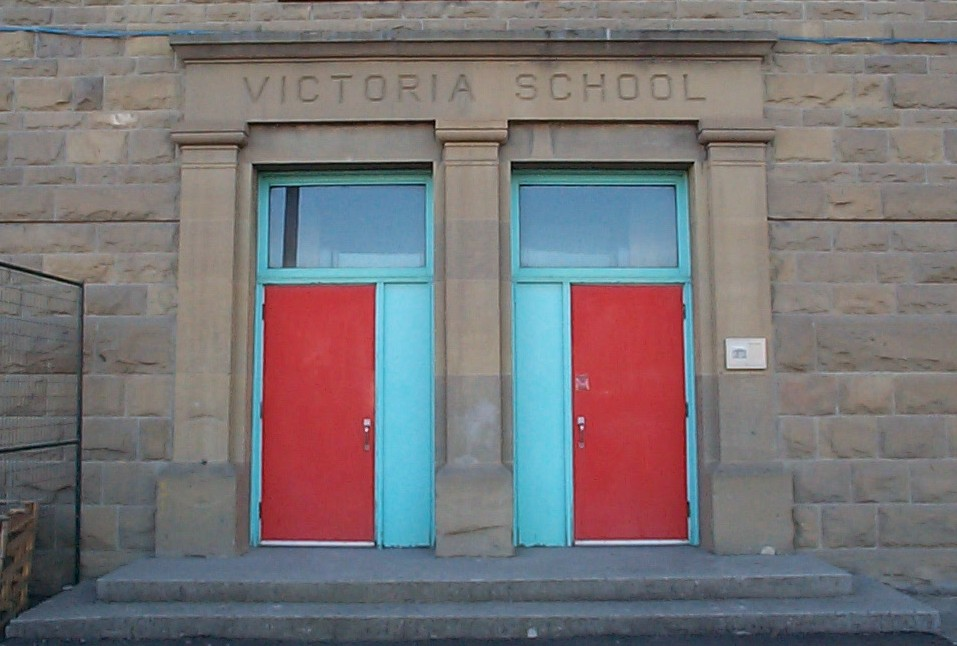
Victoria School is designated an historic site

Two public schools are located in Beltline, the Connaught Community School and the Victoria Community School. Western Canada High School is located along the 17th Avenue boundary of the community, and serves the area. One block outside Beltline is St. Mary's High School which serves most of the Roman Catholic high school students in the area

== Social issues ==
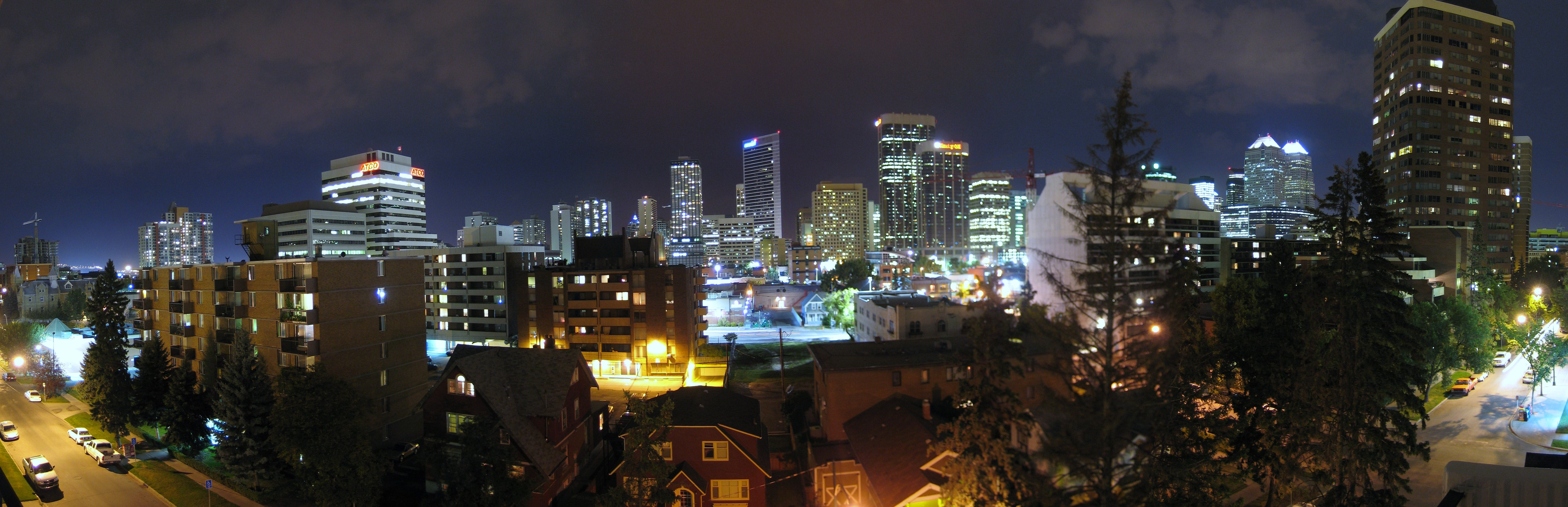
13 Ave SW in Beltline, with Downtown Calgary in background

There is a significant mix of economic groups in the community. With new revitalization, a number of middle and upper income groups are establishing themselves in the area due to the close proximity to downtown. However, low income residents still make up a large proportion of the population (28.3% in 2001). The Mustard Seed Calgary is located in Beltline at 102 11 Ave SE. There are also many poorly maintained and dilapidated buildings with low rents. A large portion of Victoria Park, in particular, is in poor condition due to the city's decision to restrict development on lands needed for Calgary Stampede expansion. Owners of this land were generally not interested in improving buildings they knew would be removed soon. As a result, a number of seemingly abandoned buildings were occupied illegally by squatters. As the city has finalized land purchases and made final decisions on land use, this has decreased dramatically.

The median household income in 2005 was $43,087 in Beltline. (compared with $67,283 Calgary average). Immigrants made up 31.3% of the residents in 2006, this compares against an immigrant population of 24.8% for Calgary overall. The majority of the buildings (95.8%) are apartments, and 70.9% of the dwellings were used for renting in 2006.

== See also ==
- Royal eponyms in Canada
