= Harnett =

Harnett may refer to:

== People ==
=== Given name ===
- Harnett Kane (1910–1984), American author

=== Surname ===
- Cornelius Harnett (1723–1781), American statesman
- Curt Harnett (born 1965), Canadian racing cyclist
- Cynthia Harnett (1893–1981), English writer of children's historical fiction.
- Greg Harnett (born 1990), Canadian lacrosse player
- Ian Harnett (1926–2001), Scottish footballer
- Joan Harnett (born 1943), New Zealand netball player and real estate agent
- Jon Harnett (born 1988), Canadian lacrosse player
- Ricci Harnett (born 1975), British actor
- William Harnett (1848–1892), Irish-American painter

== Other uses ==
- Harnett County, North Carolina
  - Harnett, Harnett County, North Carolina
  - Harnett County Airport
- USS Harnett County (LST-821)

== See also ==
- Garnett (disambiguation)
