= Battle of Kitcheners' Wood =

1915 Engagement in the Second Battle of Ypres during the First World War

- Part of the Second Battle of Ypres in the Western Front
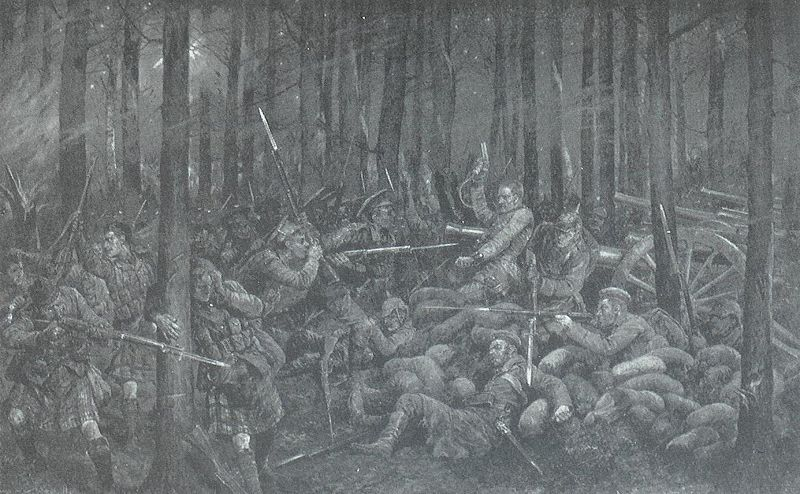
- Depiction of the Battle of Kitcheners' Wood
Date	22 April – 25 April 1915
Location	Ypres, Belgium 50.89°N 2.922°E
Result	Canadian victory

Belligerents
Canada; France	German Empire

Commanders and leaders
(Canada) Garnet Hughes (Canada) Richard Turner (Canada) Arthur Currie (Canada) Russell Lambert Boyle (DOW)	(German Empire) Unknown

Strength
2 Canadian battalions Elements of French Colonial forces	Unknown, but roughly equal or larger

Casualties and losses
Over 75% of Canadians killed or wounded	Unknown, but extremely heavy

The Battle of Kitcheners' Wood was fought in April 1915 during the Second Battle of Ypres in World War I.

== Location ==
The name of this oak plantation derived from the French name, Bois-de-Cuisinères, where French troops housed their field kitchens, and not in reference, as is sometimes thought, to the British general officer Lord Kitchener. (Thus the name of the feature is "Kitcheners' " with the apostrophe after the "s", indicating the plural possessive.)

== Background ==
On the night of 22 April 1915, the Germans launched the first poison gas attack of the war on the western front. The object of their attack was the Ypres Salient, and they concentrated their initial attack on two French divisions, the 45th (Algerian) and 79th (Territorial). Attacking in the evening of the 21st, the two French divisions found themselves ill-prepared to cope with the chlorine gas and promptly broke, leaving a gap in the line six kilometres wide.

The 1st Canadian Division, which had been in France since February, was hastily pulled out of reserve and ordered to seal the line. In particular, a position known as Kitcheners' Wood was ordered reinforced, and two Canadian battalions were selected for the job – which in the event turned out to be a major counter-attack, and the first major offensive operation of Canadian troops in the war.

== The Battle ==
At Kitcheners' Wood, the 10th Battalion, CEF of the 2nd Canadian Brigade was ordered to counter-attack into the gap created by the gas attack; they formed up after 11:00 pm on the night of 22 April. The 16th Battalion (Canadian Scottish) of the 3rd Canadian Brigade arrived as they were forming, tasked to support the advance. Both battalions had over 800 men, formed up in waves of two companies each. The order to advance was given at 11:46 pm. The leading waves of the 10th Battalion covered half the distance from the start line to the Wood, running into a strong hedge interlaced with wire. No reconnaissance had been done beforehand and the battalion was forced to break through the obstacle with rifle butts, while taking fire from German machine guns about 180 meters away. On the second day of the battle, the Canadian’s left flank, defended by the 3rd Brigade of the 1st Division of the Canadian Expeditionary Force came under heavy attack, but was holding its position and repulsing the enemy despite losses from a second gas attack and heavy and accurate artillery fire. Alderson, believing that the Canadian division was capable of holding the line, ordered his brigade commanders to move reserves up to the front line to reinforce losses rather than withdraw. However, 3/1 CEF commander Brig. Gen. Turner made a sudden and unilateral decision to withdraw his brigade back to the General Headquarters (GHQ) line, several miles to the rear. Not only did Turner not inform Alderson, his commanding officer, of his decision, he also did not tell Brigadier General Arthur Currie, commanding the 2nd Brigade on Turner's right, that Currie's flank was now completely unprotected. (Currie would be forced to withdraw his brigade the next day, albeit in an orderly fashion, in order to avoid having his flank rolled up.) Both battalions charged the last 180 meters to the wood, threw the Germans out, and suffered more than 75 percent casualties. Small parties of French troops, eager to reclaim the French guns that had been abandoned in the wood, had also participated in the battle.

After the war, Marshal Ferdinand Foch, the Allied Supreme Commander, remarked that the "greatest act of the war" had been the assault on Kitcheners' Wood by the 10th and 16th Battalions.

== Aftermath ==
The fighting in the Wood continued on for several more days, as German attacks continued to mount along the Salient, even though no clear advantage could be gained. The 1st Division as a whole suffered some 60% casualties before being relieved, and the 10th and 16th Battalions were reduced to less than 20% of their pre-battle strength.

The commanding officer of the 10th, Lieutenant-Colonel Russell Lambert Boyle, was gravely wounded by machine-gun fire in the opening attack on the Wood. He succumbed to his wounds days later.

Both battalions needed considerable time and effort to rebuild. Colonel Garnet Hughes who had directed the ill-planned attack was criticized for his poor leadership.

== Memory ==
=== Honours ===
After the war, Second Ypres and St. Julien were granted as battle honours to British and Canadian regiments, but to the dismay of the units that fought there, Kitcheners' Wood was not.

The commanding officer of the Canadian Scottish Regiment (Princess Mary's) which perpetuates the 16th Battalion (Canadian Scottish) CEF, organized a lobby to have a dress distinction awarded for the part the 10th and 16th Battalions played at Kitcheners' Wood, which was never recognized with a battle honour. In the 1930s a distinctive brass shoulder title was awarded. In the case of the Canadian Scottish, the title consisted of a brass acorn and oak leaf over a red felt backing surrounded by the title CANADIAN SCOTTISH. The Calgary Highlanders and Winnipeg Light Infantry, both of whom perpetuated the 10th Battalion (Canadians) CEF, were also awarded distinctive shoulder badges, though their pattern consisted only of a brass badge with the initials of the regiment directly on the oakleaf. The WLI were absorbed into the Royal Winnipeg Rifles in 1955 and the WLI badge fell out of use. The acorn and oak leaf are symbolic of the heavy oak trees of Kitcheners' Wood which were a significant obstacle to infantrymen in 1915. Photos taken two years later showed that the forest was eventually obliterated during the fighting. Tradition in the Canadian Army has been that metal shoulder badges consist only of letters or numerals, with only a few exceptions. The use of honorary distinctions is common, however, in the British Army, such as the addition of the Sphinx to regimental badges.

=== Legacy ===
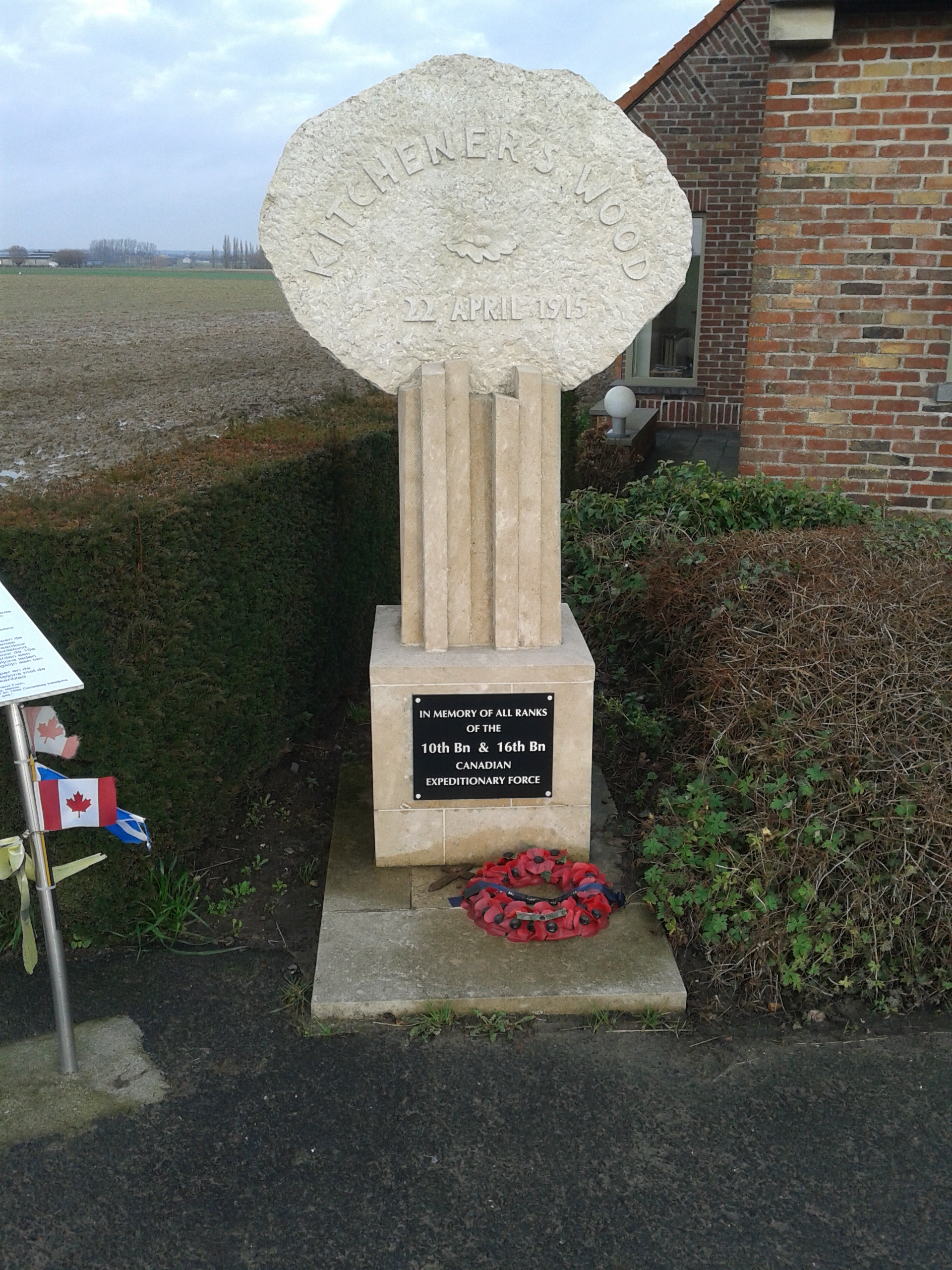
The oak leaf memorial in Sint-Juliaan, commemorating the Battle of Kitcheners' Wood.

The old City Hall in Calgary, Alberta (the city from where about 60% of the original 10th Battalion men were recruited) bears a plaque dedicated to Lieutenant Colonel Russ Boyle and the men of the 10th Battalion who made the charge at Kitcheners' Wood. The Calgary Highlanders (10th Canadians), who perpetuate the history and traditions of the 10th Battalion, commemorate the battle annually on the weekend closest to April 22. "St. Julien's Day", as it is known, usually involves an all-ranks reunion dinner, an officers' mess function, a freedom of the city parade, and a church service. The Regimental hockey team is known as "The Oakleafs" and a regimental newssheet known as The Oak Leaf has been published on and off over the years, in addition to the official newssheet, The Glen.

In Belgium, the Vrije Basisschool (elementary school) of the current day St-Juliaan displays an oak leaf memorial in honour of the event.

The 2008 film Passchendaele presents a fictionalized view of a soldier who fought in both the 2nd and 3rd Battle of Ypres, including the Battle of Kitcheners' Wood. The main character is based on 10th Battalion veteran Michael Dunne.

On 22 April 2015, exactly 100 years later, soldiers of The Calgary Highlanders and The Canadian Scottish Regiment (Princess Mary's) assembled at the former location of Mouse Trap Farm and paraded to the former location of the Wood led by their combined pipes and drums. A service of remembrance was conducted at sunset at the oak leaf memorial, and soldiers, veterans and family members of both regiments were hosted to a dinner on the site of the former battlefield.
