= Harry W. Brown (VC) =

Canadian recipient of the Victoria Cross

Harry W. Brown VC
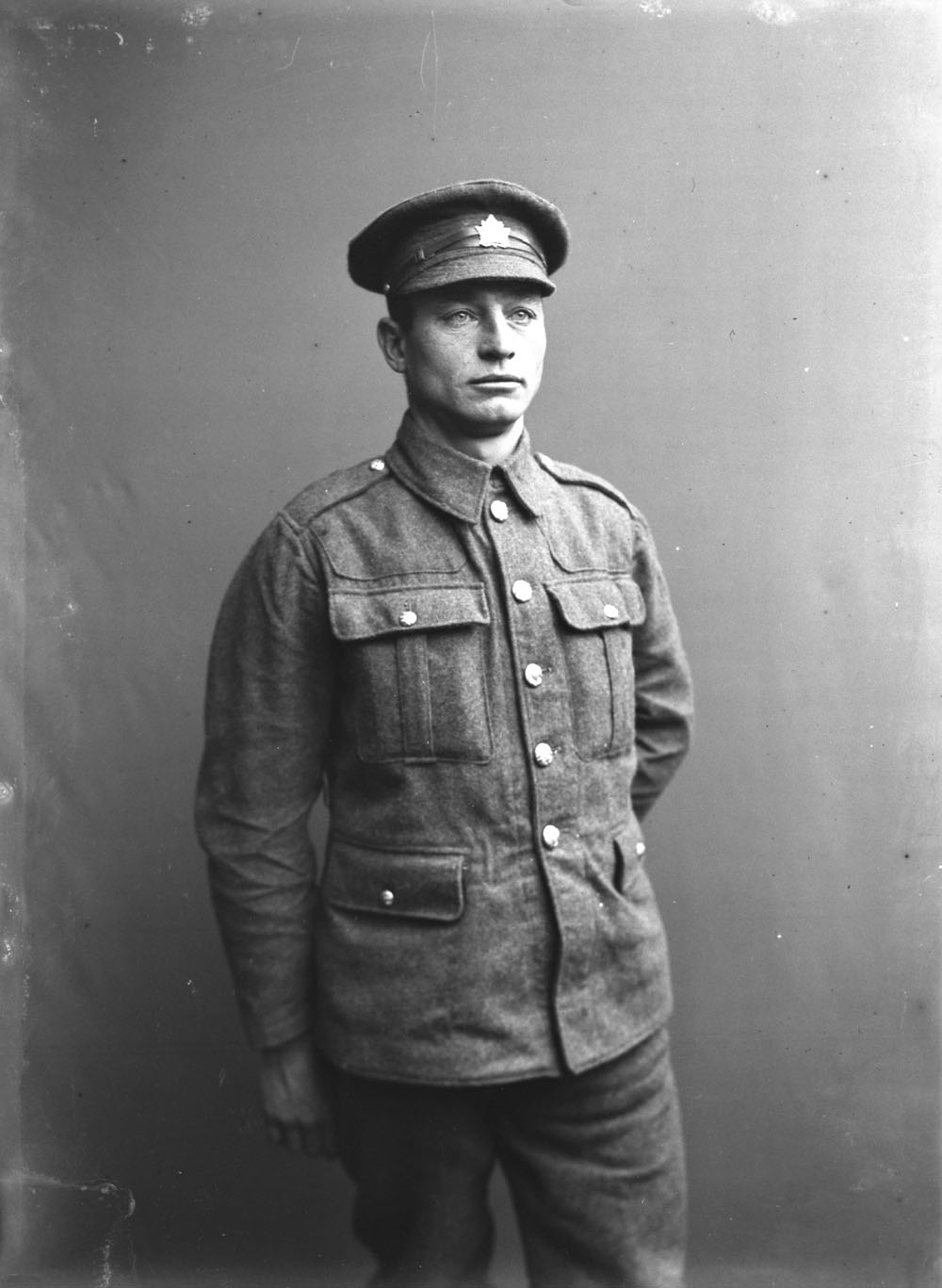
- Private Harry Brown
- Born: 11 May 1898; Gananoque, Ontario
- Died: 17 August 1917 (aged 19); Hill 70, France
- Burial place: Noeux-les-Mines Communal Cemetery (Plot 11. Row J. Grave 29)
- Military career
- Allegiance: Canada
- Branch: Canadian Expeditionary Force
- Service years: 1916 - 1917
- Rank: Private
- Units: 10th Battalion, CEF
- Conflicts: First World War: Battle of Hill 70 (DOW)
- Awards: Victoria Cross

Harry Brown VC (11 May 1898 – 17 August 1917), was a Canadian First World War recipient of the Victoria Cross, the highest and most prestigious award for gallantry in the face of the enemy that can be awarded to British and Commonwealth forces.

== Background ==
Harry Brown, from Canada, Gananoque, Ontario,[1] was born on 9 May 1898 to John and Adelaide (née Leger). After his father died, Harry lived with his mother and sisters, Irene and Loretta, in Peterborough, Ontario. His mother married Patrick McAuliffe of R. R. 1, East Emily in 1911 and Harry worked on the farm .[1] Later, he moved to London, Ontario, where his sister, Irene, lived. A story about Hill 70 in the Royal Canadian magazine <pg 8/18 March 2005> says he was working a munitions factory when he enlisted with the Canadian Mounted Rifles on 18 August 1916 at London, Ontario, where, according to his attestation paper, he was residing at the time. After being sent overseas, he was transferred to the 10th Battalion, CEF.

Brown was awarded the Victoria Cross for his actions on 16 August 1917, during the Battle of Hill 70 against the Germans, when Brown and another soldier ran the gauntlet with an "important message". Brown sustained mortal injury, and died the following day, 17 August. His death is commemorated on the Gananoque Cenotaph and on 16 August 2007 a black marble memorial cairn was dedicated to commemorate the action for which he received the Victoria Cross

=== Citation ===
For most conspicuous bravery, courage and devotion to duty. After the capture of a position, the enemy massed in force and counter-attacked. The situation became very critical, all wires being cut. It was of the utmost importance to get word back to Headquarters. This soldier and one other were given the message with orders to deliver the same at all costs. The other messenger was killed. Private Brown had his arm shattered but continued on through an intense barrage until he arrived at the close support lines and found an officer. He was so spent that he fell down the dug-out steps, but retained consciousness long enough to hand over his message, saying ' Important message.' He then became unconscious and died in the dressing station a few hours later. His devotion to duty was of the highest possible degree imaginable, and his successful delivery of the message undoubtedly saved the loss of the position for the time and prevented many casualties.

— The London Gazette, No. 30338, 16 October 1917

Harry Brown's Victoria Cross is displayed at the Canadian War Museum in Ottawa, Canada. The 10th Battalion, CEF is perpetuated by the Royal Winnipeg Rifles and the Calgary Highlanders of the Canadian Army Reserve.

He is also commemorated on the Omemee, Ontario Cenotaph, as his next of kin resided in Emily Township.
