= Russell Lambert Boyle =

Canadian Expeditionary Force officer

- Born: October 29, 1880; Port Colborne, Ontario
- Died: April 25, 1915 (aged 34); Ypres, Belgium
- Burial place: Poperinghe Old Military Cemetery; Poperinghe
- Spouse: Laura Boyle
- Military career
- Allegiance: Canada
- Service years: 1899–1900; 1914–1915
- Rank: Lieutenant-Colonel
- Unit: 15th Light Horse
- Commands: 10th Battalion, CEF
- Conflicts: Second Boer War; World War I: Ypres Salient actions; 2nd Battle of Ypres; Battle of Kitcheners' Wood (DOW)
- Awards: Mentioned in Despatches
- Other work: rancher

Russell Lambert Boyle (October 29, 1880 – April 25, 1915) was a Canadian rancher and soldier. Boyle served in the Second Boer War and commanded the 10th Battalion, CEF from its time at Valcartier at the beginning of the First World War, to his death. Boyle led the 10th Battalion in their first battle on 22 April 1915, the attack on Kitcheners' Wood. He was hit by five machine gun bullets and died at No. 3 Casualty Clearing Station. He is buried in the Commonwealth War Graves Commission's Poperinghe Old Military Cemetery.

== Service ==
Boyle served in the Second Boer War, and between the wars farmed and ranched at Crossfield, Alberta. He also served in the 15th Light Horse, a Militia unit in southern Alberta, where he served as a squadron commander. At the start of the First World War, Boyle held the rank of major. He was attested to the Canadian Expeditionary Force on 25 September 1914 at Valcartier. The 10th's first commanding officer held the position only for a matter of days due to a personal dispute with Sir Sam Hughes, and Boyle was appointed commanding officer at Valcartier. He then travelled to the United Kingdom with the battalion later that year.

Boyle was tall (188 cm or 6 ft 2 in) and has been described as "rough-and-tough". One of his first acts on arriving in England was to parade the 10th Battalion, throw his coat to the ground, and announce to his men that anyone who wanted to "punch the hell out of me" could take the opportunity without disciplinary repercussions. Reportedly, no one took him up on it.

The 10th Battalion was assigned to the 2nd Infantry Brigade of the (1st) Canadian Division. After indoctrination tours of the trenches in France in early 1915, the division took over front line trenches in the Ypres Salient in April. The Germans launched a poison gas attack on 22 April, forcing the collapse of two French divisions. The 10th Battalion was in reserve, and along with the 16th Battalion (Canadian Scottish) were rushed to the point of the breakthrough and ordered to counter-attack Kitcheners' Wood. Boyle reportedly told his men "We have been aching for a fight, and now we are going to get it." The 10th Battalion was placed in front and Boyle advanced with his men over 400 yards of open ground. Massed German machine guns opened fire on the attacking Canadians and Major Ormond later noted "The colonel got five bullets from a machine-gun in his left groin - made a wonderful pattern of two and a half inches." While the counter-attack was successful, Lieutenant-Colonel Boyle was evacuated to hospital and died on 25 April 1915.

== Legacy ==
An equestrian statue of R.L. Boyle, in his Boer War uniform, sits atop a Boer War memorial in Calgary's Central Memorial Park. He is also mentioned by name on a plaque at the entrance to Calgary City Hall. On the 100th Anniversary of the attack on Kitcheners' Wood, a delegation of The Calgary Highlanders (who perpetuate the 10th Battalion) visited his grave. His grandson, Mr. Russell Everett Boyle, and his wife, Melody were part of the delegation.

== See also ==
- Military file from Library and Archives Canada
