= Garnett =

Garnett may refer to:

- Garnett (given name)
- Garnett (surname)
- Garnett, Kansas, a city in Kansas
- Garnett station, a MARTA rail station in Atlanta, Georgia

== See also ==
- Harnett
