= Garnett Norman =

American baseball player

- Outfielder
- Born: January 1, 1900; Chattanooga, Tennessee, U.S.
- Died: March 8, 1925 (aged 25); Chattanooga, Tennessee, U.S.
- Batted: Right

Negro league baseball debut
- 1923, for the Memphis Red Sox

Last appearance
- 1924, for the Memphis Red Sox

Teams
- Memphis Red Sox (1923–1924)

Garnett Wesley Norman (January 1, 1900 – March 8, 1925), also known as "Garrett", and nicknamed "Bughouse", was an American Negro league outfielder in the 1920s.

A native of Chattanooga, Tennessee, Norman made his Negro leagues debut in 1923 with the Memphis Red Sox. He returned to Memphis in 1924, his final professional season. Norman died in Chattanooga in 1925 at age 25.
