= Villers-lès-Cagnicourt =

- Commune
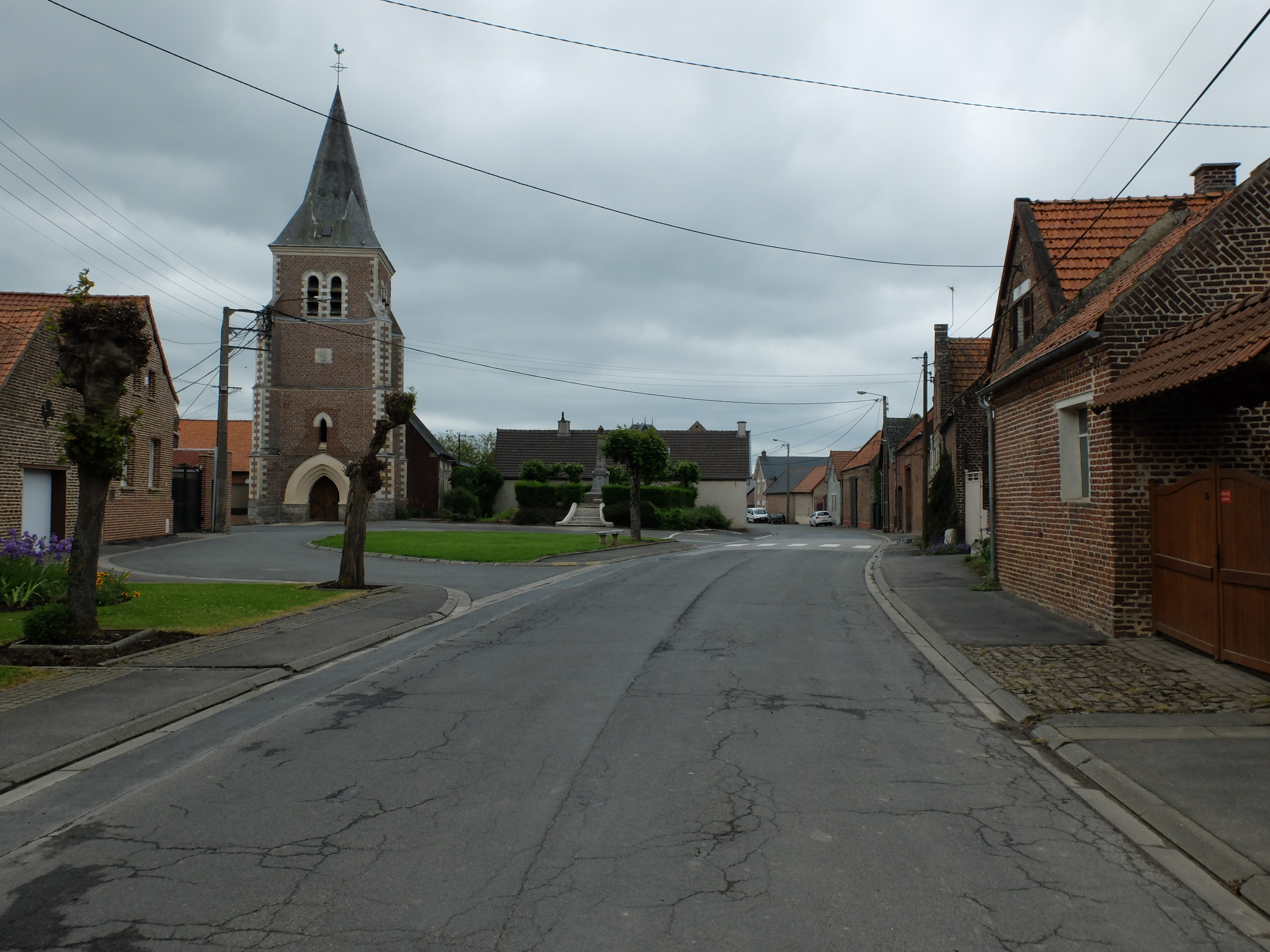
- The centre of Villers-lès-Cagnicourt
- Location of Villers-lès-Cagnicourt
- Location within France Location within Hauts-de-France
- Coordinates: 50°13′23″N 3°00′36″E
- Country: France
- Region: Hauts-de-France
- Department: Pas-de-Calais
- Arrondissement: Arras
- Canton: Brebières
- Intercommunality: CC Osartis Marquion

Government
  - Mayor (2020–2026): Yves Legros
- Area^{1}: 4.4 km^{2} (1.7 sq mi)
- Elevation: 54 m (177 ft)
- Highest elevation: 79 m (259 ft)
- Lowest elevation: 47 m (154 ft)
- Population (2023): 243
  - Density: 55/km^{2} (140/sq mi)
- Time zone: UTC+01:00 (CET)
  - Summer (DST): UTC+02:00 (CEST)
- INSEE/Postal code: 62858 /62182
- ^{1} French Land Register data, which excludes lakes, ponds, glaciers > 1 km^{2} (0.386 sq mi or 247 acres) and river estuaries.

Villers-lès-Cagnicourt (French pronunciation: [vilɛʁ lɛ kaɲikuʁ], literally Villers near Cagnicourt) is a commune in the Pas-de-Calais department in the Hauts-de-France region of France about 15 miles (24 km) southeast of Arras.

== Population ==
Historical population
Year	Pop.	±% p.a.
1968	224	—
1975	225	+0.06%
1982	207	−1.18%
1990	201	−0.37%
1999	212	+0.59%
2007	230	+1.02%
2012	256	+2.17%
2017	264	+0.62%
2023	243	−1.37%
Source: INSEE

== See also ==
- Communes of the Pas-de-Calais department
