= 10th Battalion (Canadians), CEF =

Unit of the WWI Canadian Expeditionary Force

10th Battalion Canadian Expeditionary Force
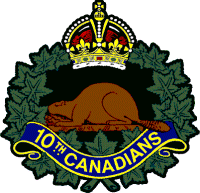
- Battalion cap badge
- Active: September 1914 – 1920
- Country: Canada
- Branch: Canadian Expeditionary Force
- Type: Line infantry
- Size: One battalion
- Part of: 2nd Canadian Infantry Brigade
- Nicknames: The Fighting Tenth; White Gurkhas
- March: "Colonel Bogey"
- Anniversaries: 22 April ("The Glorious Memory of the 22nd of April")
- Engagements: 2nd Ypres; The Somme; Vimy; Hill 70; Passchendaele; Amiens; Canada's Hundred Days
- Battle honours: List: Ypres, 1915, '17; Gravenstafel; St. Julien; Festubert, 1915; Mount Sorrel; Somme, 1916; Thiepval; Ancre Heights; Arras, 1917, '18; Vimy, 1917; Arleux; Hill 70; Passchendaele; Amiens; Scarpe, 1918; Dorcourt–Quéant; Hindenburg Line; Canal du Nord; Pursuit to Mons; France and Flanders, 1915–18

Commanders
- Notable commanders: Lieutenant-Colonel Russell Lambert Boyle

Insignia
- Battle patch

The 10th Battalion, Canadian Expeditionary Force was a unit of the First World War Canadian Expeditionary Force (CEF), specifically in the 1st Canadian Division, from 1914 to 1919. The battalion participated in every major Canadian battle of the First World War, and set a record for the most decorations earned by a Canadian unit in a single battle at Hill 70. The unit was known to its contemporaries simply as the "Fighting Tenth".

The 10th Battalion is perpetuated by the Royal Winnipeg Rifles and the Calgary Highlanders (10th Canadians).

== History ==
The Canadian Expeditionary Force was a separate entity created in 1914 by Canada's Minister of Militia Sir Sam Hughes for service to Britain in the First World War. Technically distinct from the standing land forces in existence at the time, soldiers were legally attested into the CEF in order to serve overseas. Hughes refused to mobilize the existing Militia units as units, and instead numbered battalions were created into which a combination of Permanent Force (regular) soldiers, Militia (reservists) and civilian volunteers were combined.

The Provisional 10th Battalion of the Canadian Expeditionary Force was created around cadres of Militiamen from two existing units; the 103rd Regiment (Calgary Rifles) and the 106th Regiment (Winnipeg Light Infantry). The unit was assembled at Valcartier in Quebec, and sailed for the United Kingdom with the first Canadian contingent in late 1914. Their commanding officer was Lieutenant-Colonel Russ L. Boyle, a veteran of the war in South Africa and in 1914 the commander of the 15th Light Horse, an Alberta cavalry unit.

The unit trained on Salisbury Plain, and went into the trenches in France in early 1915 with the rest of the division.

== War service ==
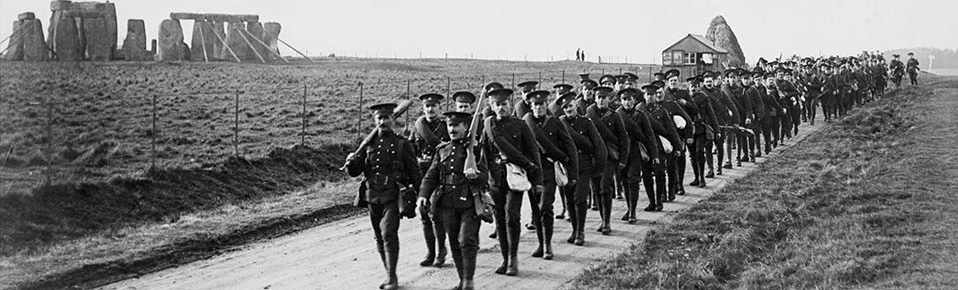
Men of the 10th Battalion pass Stonehenge

The battalion was awarded 20 battle honours for its service in France and in the Flanders region of Belgium.

Ypres, 1915, '17: The Second Battle of Ypres in 1915 was the first major action for the 1st Canadian Division. It was also the first instance on the Western Front of the use of poison gas as a weapon of war. A wide scale German attack using this gas routed two entire French divisions, but the First Canadian Division held firm, at a cost of some 6,000 of its 10,000 men. It was during this battle that the St. Julien battle was fought, and the counter-attack at Kitcheners' Wood was mounted, for which the Oak Leaf shoulder badge distinction was eventually granted.

The Third Battle of Ypres in 1917 describes very large operations in this area, including the Battle of Passchendaele.

Gravenstafel: The Gravenstafel Ridge was a low rise east of Ypres, one of the key features in the German attacks from 24 to 26 April 1915. The 10th Battalion by this point, after suffering heavily in its counter-attacks of 22–23 April, mustered only 174 men but still contributed enough to the defence of the position to merit a battle honour for their work.

Saint-Julien: The town of St. Julien was east of Ypres, in the south-western part of Belgium known as Flanders. The 10th Battalion was called forward on the night of 22–23 April to counterattack the strong German formation advancing through a large gap in the line created by the rout of two French divisions. Forming up in front of the 16th Battalion, the two units mounted a hasty assault on an oak plantation known as Bois de Cuisiniers, or Kitcheners' Wood, so named because the French had located their field kitchens there. The assault cost the life of the 10th's commanding officer, Lieutenant-Colonel Boyle, and of the 816 men who crossed the start line on 22 April, only some 193 survived. Nonetheless, the German advance was stopped. This action moved the overall commander of the French Army to describe the attack as the single bravest act of the entire war.

Festubert, 1915: Fought 20 kilometres north of Vimy, France, this unsuccessful attempt to capture K5, a small hill, was stopped short with heavy losses due to wet terrain, strong German defences, and little time to prepare.

Mount Sorrel: Another unsuccessful assault, this counter-attack by the 10th Battalion was launched on a small knoll in the Ypres Salient on 3 June 1916. Considerable losses were suffered. Despite the relatively low height of this feature, it provided an excellent viewpoint over the otherwise flat terrain in the area and was of considerable strategic importance.

Somme, 1916: The Canadians were not involved in the opening phases of this campaign, which began on 1 July 1916 – the "July Drive." That first day was the bloodiest day in the history of the British Army, with 20,000 men being killed and 40,000 more being wounded. That opening day was only the beginning of several months of major operations by both the British and French armies. By the time the battle wound down to an official conclusion in November, hundreds of thousands of soldiers on both sides of the lines had been killed, and thousands more maimed and injured. The 10th Battalion was involved in a series of operations from 8 September and 17 October, primarily defensive actions which were successful, north of Albert, France near the town of Boiselle.

Thiepval: Thiepval Ridge, near the town of Courcelette, represented a successful offensive operation for the 10th Battalion, fought on 26 September 1916, at the cost of 241 casualties.

Ancre Heights: Another successful defensive battle fought by the 10th Battalion, during the Somme Campaign, near the town of Albert, France. Modest casualties were suffered during the action on 10–11 September 1916.

Arras, 1917: The Arras battles refer to the overall British offensives in that area of Northern France, the first battle (in 1917) of which included the dramatic Canadian capture of Vimy Ridge. The 10th Battalion fought in the Arras battles of 1917 and 1918 though the official battle honour only reflects the 1917 battles (see footnote).

Vimy, 1917: The Battle of Vimy Ridge formed part of the wider Battle of Arras and was intended in part to support French operations farther south. On 9 April 1917, the four divisions of the Canadian Corps attacked the ridge and captured most of their objectives on the first day, securing the remaining positions over the following three days. British and French forces had previously attempted to capture the ridge after German forces occupied it in 1914. The 10th Battalion took part in the assault, reached its assigned objectives, and suffered 374 casualties.

Arleux: The Arleux Loop was a follow-up to the Vimy operation, launched on 28 April 1917, aimed at capturing a major German billeting area at Arleux-en-Gohelle. The operation went in over open ground and produced serious casualties.

Hill 70: Rising only 4.6 metres (15 ft) over surrounding terrain, this hill north of Lens, France, was the scene of a diversionary attack to relieve pressure on the city of Lens itself. On 15–16 August 1917, a strong German counter-attack was repulsed by the 10th Battalion. Private Harry Brown, who was killed acting as a courier during this battle, was posthumously awarded the Victoria Cross. In addition to the VC, three DSOs, 7 MC, 9 DCMs and 60 MMs were earned by the 10th Battalion, giving the 10th Battalion the distinction of receiving more medals than any other Canadian combat unit in a single action in the course of the First World War.

Passchendaele: Named for a village on a low rise in the Ypres Salient, the very word Passchendaele has become synonymous with suffering and waste. Strong German defences in this area, developed over the course of more than two years, gave the British extremely hard going.

The 10th Battalion were called out of reserve to assist an attack on Hill 52, part of the same low rise Passchendaele itself was on. The battalion was not scheduled to attack, but the CO wisely prepared his soldiers as if they would be making the main assault—a decision that paid dividends when the unit was called out of reserve. On 10 November 1917, the 10th Battalion took the feature with light casualties.

Amiens: The offensive Allied campaign under the command of Marshal Foch of the French Army cleared the Germans from positions near the important rail centre of Amiens. Consisting of a series of battles fought from August to September 1918, it signalled the beginning of the end of the war on the Western Front.

Scarpe, 1918: A defensive operation, finding the 10th Battalion once again in the Somme sector. A successful defence of the Fampoux area on the Anzain-Arras Road was made beside the Scarpe River, between 27 April and 4 May 1918.

Drocourt-Quéant: The D-Q Line, as it was commonly known, was but a part of the famous Hindenburg Line, a large series of German fortifications and defensive positions. During the Amiens campaign mentioned above, the 10th Battalion was part of a successful advance along the Arras-Cambrai road towards Viller-lez-Cagnicourt. Acting Sergeant Arthur Knight was posthumously awarded the Victoria Cross for his exemplary courage during this action.

Hindenburg Line: The last line of defence for the German Army in the Amiens campaign, broken when Cambrai fell on 9 October 1918, and the beginning of a German retreat that would not end until the Armistice on 11 November.

Canal du Nord: The last major operation of the 10th Battalion, part of the Battle of Cambrai. The Fighting 10th mounted a crossing of this obstacle on 27–28 September 1918, suffering heavy losses.

Pursuit to Mons: The fight at Mons in August 1914 had been one of the opening acts of the war on the Western Front, and the city had great sentimental significance to the British, who had lost it to the Germans. The 10th Battalion entered the newly captured city during the war's last days, when it was a prime objective for the British Army seeking revenge, and were there when the Armistice was declared.

France and Flanders, 1915–18: This battle honour reflects the continuous service by the battalion from February 1915, when it went into the lines in France, to November 1918. During the First World War, more than 1300 soldiers were killed while serving as members of the 10th Battalion, Canadian Expeditionary Force.

== Postwar ==
The battalion crossed the Rhine as part of the Canadian occupation force in 1918, and returned to Canada in 1919. The battalion remained in existence on paper into 1920, until the Otter Commission resolved the question of how to perpetuate the CEF in the postwar army. The thorny problem of who would lay claim to the traditions of the 10th Battalion was solved by permitting a dual perpetuation by The Calgary Highlanders and The Winnipeg Light Infantry, whose predecessors had contributed men to the initial drafts that created the 10th in 1914.

== Notable battalion members ==
- Victoria Cross recipient Harry Brown
- Victoria Cross recipient Arthur George Knight
- Lance Corporal J.T. Milne was the first Canadian soldier to be awarded the Military Medal three times (MM and two bars).
- Lance Corporal Robert Smith, MM was awarded the Military Medal.
- Sergeant William Alexander was one of only 25 soldiers executed for desertion in Canadian history.
- Two soldiers of the battalion were nominated for the Victoria Cross, but had lesser awards substituted: Lance Corporal George William Allan, DCM, and Captain Charles Costigan, DSO, MC.

== Gallantry awards ==
Gallantry and leadership awards
Award	VC	DSO & 2 Bars	DSO & Bar	DSO	MC & Bar	MC	DCM & Bar	DCM	MM & 2 Bars	MM & Bar	MM	MSM	MiD	For
Numbers	2	1	3	14	12	51	1	65	1	21	269	18	83	22

== Casualties ==
Cause	Officer fatalities	Other rank fatalities	Officers – non fatal	Other ranks – non fatal
Enemy fire	55	1249	107	2701
Gas	0	3	1	116
Injuries	0	6	9	299
Injured prisoners	0	2 (DOW)	2	15
Uninjured prisoners	0	0	0	16

- Total officers fatalities – 55
- Total other ranks fatalities – 1260

== Japanese-Canadians ==
The 10th Battalion was noted for accepting, apparently without prejudice, significant numbers of Japanese-Canadians into its ranks during the war. Other Canadian battalions rejected these volunteers on racial grounds; several were decorated for bravery during their service with the 10th Battalion. The Calgary Highlanders Gallery at The Military Museums in Calgary has a dedicated display to the contributions of these soldiers.

== Regimental associations ==
Returning veterans created two separate 10th Battalion Associations, in Winnipeg and in Calgary, and remained active as veterans groups in the interwar years. The Calgary group was responsible for obtaining a stand of regimental colours for the battalion in 1953, which were laid up in Knox United Church in Calgary. In 1956, the 10th Battalion Association was merged with The Calgary Highlanders Association to become the 10th Battalion Calgary Highlanders Association, and by this point the WLI had been amalgamated with The Royal Winnipeg Rifles. In 2012, this organization changed its name to The Calgary Highlanders Regimental Association. The group is still active today under that designation.

== Published histories and memoirs ==
- Gallant Canadians: The Story of the Tenth Canadian Infantry Battalion, 1914–1919 by Daniel G. Dancocks (Calgary Highlanders Regimental Funds Foundation, 1990) 251 pages, lavishly illustrated throughout with photos and maps ISBN 0-9694616-0-7
- Gallant Calgarians: The Story of the 10th Battalion Calgary Highlanders Association Heritage Section, 1995–2006 (Published by the 10th Battalion Calgary Highlanders Association Heritage Section) 98 pages, illustrated with 200 colour photographs ISBN 978-0-9782646-6-6

== Cultural references ==
The 10th Battalion is depicted in two major films, Legends of the Fall, and Passchendaele.

The pipe tune Machine Gunner Wally Bennett was written by a member of the Regimental Pipes and Drums of The Calgary Highlanders in honour of Sergeant Wally Bennett, a veteran of the 10th Battalion.

== Monuments ==
Calgary-area soldiers who died with the 10th Battalion are memorialized on the Calgary Soldiers' Memorial. 10th Battalion soldiers who went missing in combat are listed on the Vimy Memorial and Menin Gate. The village church at Villers-lès-Cagnicourt has several plaques dedicated to Canadians decorated for valour for actions in the fighting nearby in 1918. One plaque commemorates the Victoria Cross awarded posthumously to Sergeant Arthur George Knight. Lance Corporal Robert Smith, MM, is memorialized with a plaque on the Canyon Park Cenotaph in the community of Canyon, east of Creston, British Columbia.

== See also ==
- List of infantry battalions in the Canadian Expeditionary Force
