= Garnet (disambiguation) =

Garnet is a mineral.

Garnet(s) may also refer to:

== Characters ==
- Garnet (Steven Universe)
- Garnet (Jewelpet), Persian cat character
- Garnet Til Alexandros XVII, a character in Final Fantasy IX
- Garnet, one of the identical twins in the 1995 Jacqueline Wilson book Double Act

== Music ==
- Garnet Crow, a Japanese Rock band named after the gemstone
- Garnet (ガーネット Gānetto), song by Japanese singer Hanako Oku
- Garnet ~Kindan no Sono E~, song/single by Malice Mizer

== Places ==
- Garnet, California
- Garnet, Michigan
- Garnet, Montana
- Garnet, Wisconsin

== Other uses ==
- Garnet (color), any of various dark reds
- Garnet (name)
- "Garnet," a common variety of sweet potato
- Garnet OS, a discontinued mobile operating system
- Garnets (volume), obsolete Imperial Russian unit of dry volume
- Swarthmore Garnet, nickname of Swarthmore College
- Garnets, team name of Haddon Heights High School
- Logical Garnet, a three dimensional figure to illustrate logical relationships
