= Garnett Stackelberg =

American journalist and socialite

Garnett Stackelberg (born 5 January 1910, Chadron, Nebraska: d.12 January 2005, Georgetown) was an American journalist and socialite.

Garnett Butler was born in Nebraska on 5 January 1910. Her father was a building contractor and her mother was a teacher. Garnett attended Oregon State University before travelling to Shanghai in 1932, where she worked at the US Consulate. After surviving house arrest under the Japanese occupation, she left her first husband, and settled in Washington, D.C., where she became a successful journalist, lecturer and society hostess.

She had already started writing for the Shanghai Evening Post, and went on to contribute to the Washington Star, the Baltimore News-American, Dossier magazine, Washington Life Magazine, the Palm Beach Daily News and the North American edition of L'Officiel, covering travel and Washington, DC society events. She also gave lecture tours about her travel experiences.

== Marriage and family ==
Garnett married twice:

- William Gardiner, a Canadian doctor whom she met and married in China (div.1945)
- Baron Constantine "Steno" von Stackelberg (d.1989), an Estonian, based in Washington, who worked for the Dept of Commerce, FAA, and TWA, m. August 9, 1945

with whom she had one son, Charles Alexander "Sandy" von Stackelberg.
