= Second Battle of Ypres =

Battle of the First World War

- Part of the Western Front of the First World War
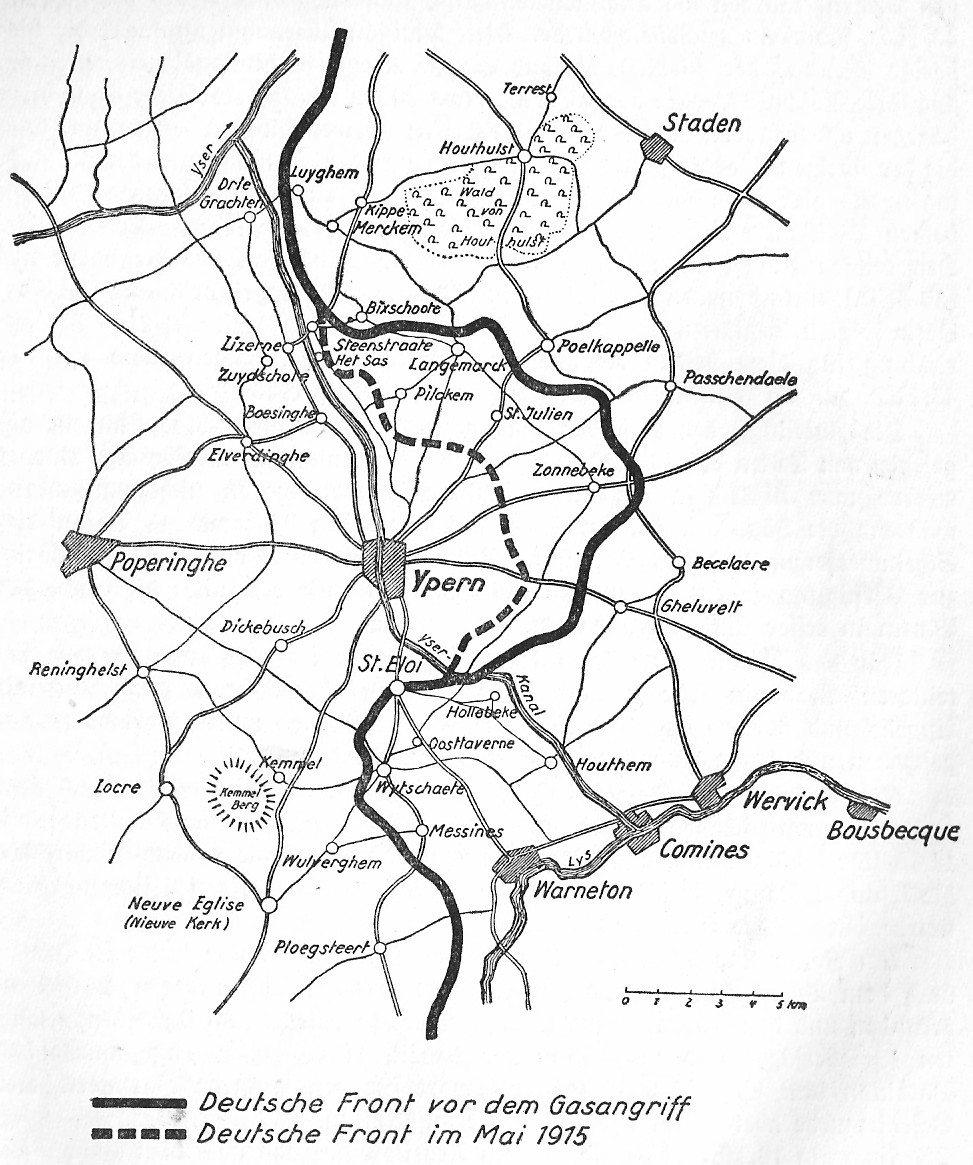
- German diagram showing the new front line after the 2nd Battle of Ypres
| Date | 22 April – 25 May 1915 |
| Location | Ypres, Belgium 50°53′58″N 02°56′26″E |
| Result | See Analysis section |
| Territorial changes | British withdraw to a new line 3 miles closer to Ypres |

Belligerents
| British Empire; United Kingdom; Canada; India; France; Belgium | German Empire |

Commanders and leaders
| (United Kingdom of Great Britain and Ireland) Horace Smith-Dorrien; (United Kingdom of Great Britain and Ireland) Herbert Plumer; (Canada) Arthur Currie; (France) Henri Gabriel Putz; (Belgium) Armand De Ceuninck | (German Empire) Albrecht of Württemberg |

Strength
| 6 British divisions; 2 French divisions; 1 Belgian division | 7 divisions |

Casualties and losses
| British: 59,275; French: 2,000–3,000 to 21,973 | 35,000+ |
- Ypres, a Belgian municipality in the Flemish province of West Flanders

The Second Battle of Ypres was fought from 22 April to 25 May 1915, during the First World War, for control of the tactically valuable high ground to the east and the south of the Flemish town of Ypres, in western Belgium. The First Battle of Ypres had been fought the previous autumn. The Second Battle of Ypres was the occasion of the first mass use by Germany of poison gas on the Western Front.

== Background ==
The German chemist Walther Nernst was a volunteer driver in 1914 and proposed to Colonel Max Bauer, the German general staff officer responsible for liaison with scientists, that they could empty the opposing trenches by a surprise attack with tear gas. Observing a field test of this idea, the chemist Fritz Haber instead proposed using heavier-than-air chlorine gas.

The professional head of the German Army, General Erich von Falkenhayn, agreed to try the new weapon with the 4th Army. Falkenhayn wanted to use the gas to cover the transfer of units to the Eastern Front to assist the Austro-Hungarian Army against the Imperial Russian Army after its losses in 1914. Gas could not be released directly because the valves would freeze; liquid chlorine from cylinders would be syphoned for it to vaporise and be carried by a breeze to the British and French lines. German troops carried 5,730 gas cylinders, the largest weighing 40 kg (88 lb), into the front line for the release.

The installation was supervised by Haber, Otto Hahn, James Franck and Gustav Hertz. Cylinders were breached by shell fire on two occasions and the second time, three men were killed and fifty wounded. Some of the Germans were protected by miners' oxygen breathing apparatus. The Ypres Salient was selected for the attack, the front line followed the canal and bulged eastward around the town. North of the salient, the Belgian army held the line of the Yser, and the north end of the salient was held by two French divisions. The eastern bulge of the salient was defended by the 1st Canadian Division and two British divisions. The II Corps and V Corps of the Second Army comprised the 1st Cavalry Division, 2nd Cavalry Division and 3rd Cavalry Division, as well as the 4th Division, 27th Division, 28th Division, 50th (Northumbrian) Division, 3rd (Lahore) Division and the 1st Canadian Division.

== Battle ==
In A record of the Engagements ... (1923), E. A. James used The Official Names of the Battles and Other Engagements ... (1921) to provide a summary of each engagement and the formations involved. (Note: A record of the Engagements of the British Armies in France and Flanders, 1914–1918 (1923 [1990]) The Official Names of the Battles and Other Engagements Fought by the Military Forces of the British Empire during the Great War, 1914–1919, and the Third Afghan War, 1919: Report of the Battles Nomenclature Committee as approved by the Army Council (1921)) In the Battles of Ypres, 1915, there were four engagements involving the Second Army from 22 April to 25 May.

- Battle of Gravenstafel (Thursday 22 April – Friday 23 April)
- Battle of St. Julien (Saturday 24 April – 4 May)
- Battle of Frezenberg (8–13 May)
- Battle of Bellewaarde (24–25 May)

=== Battle of Gravenstafel Ridge (22–23 April 1915) ===
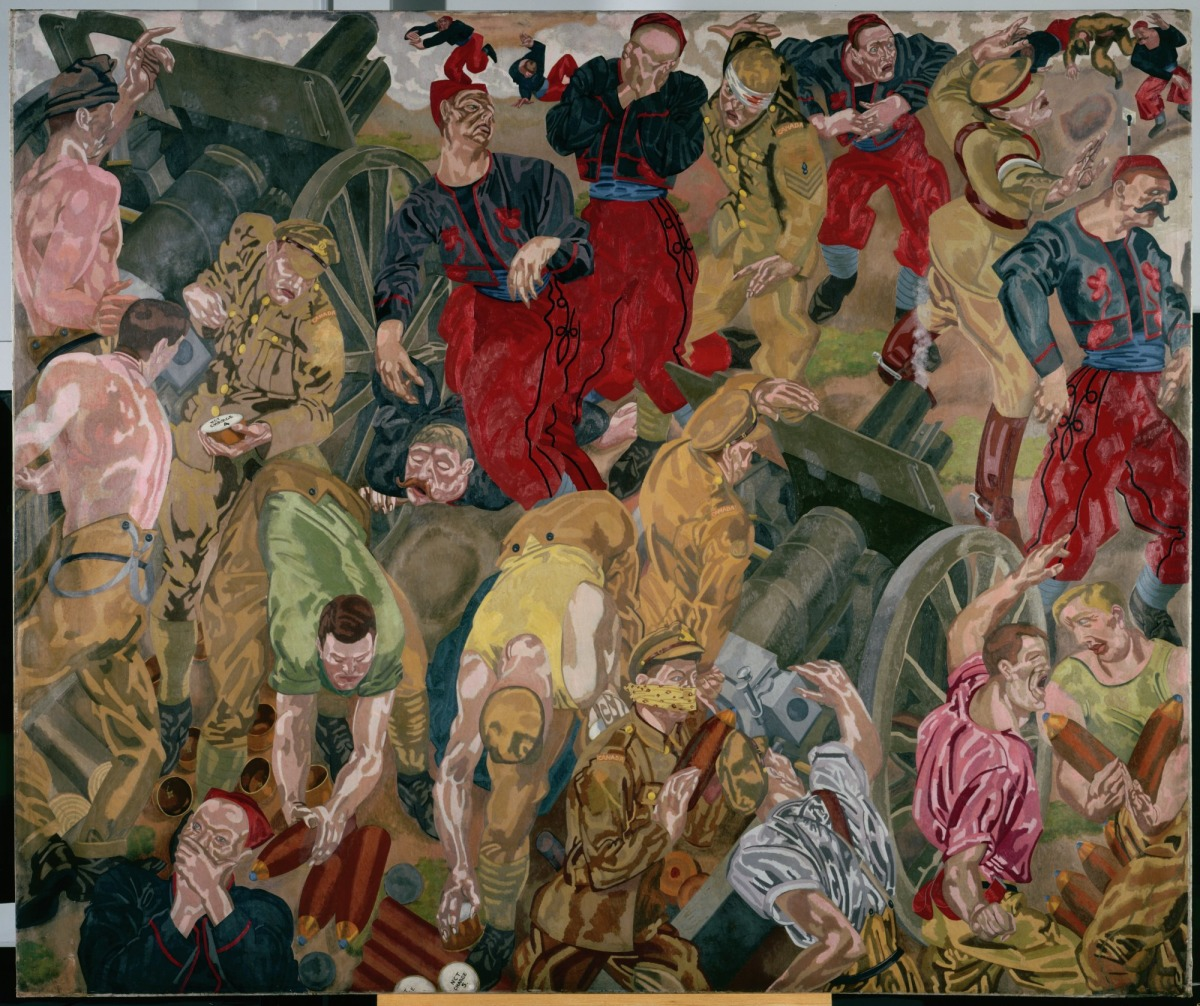
The First German Gas Attack at Ypres by William Roberts depicting the German gas attack on French and Canadian soldiers

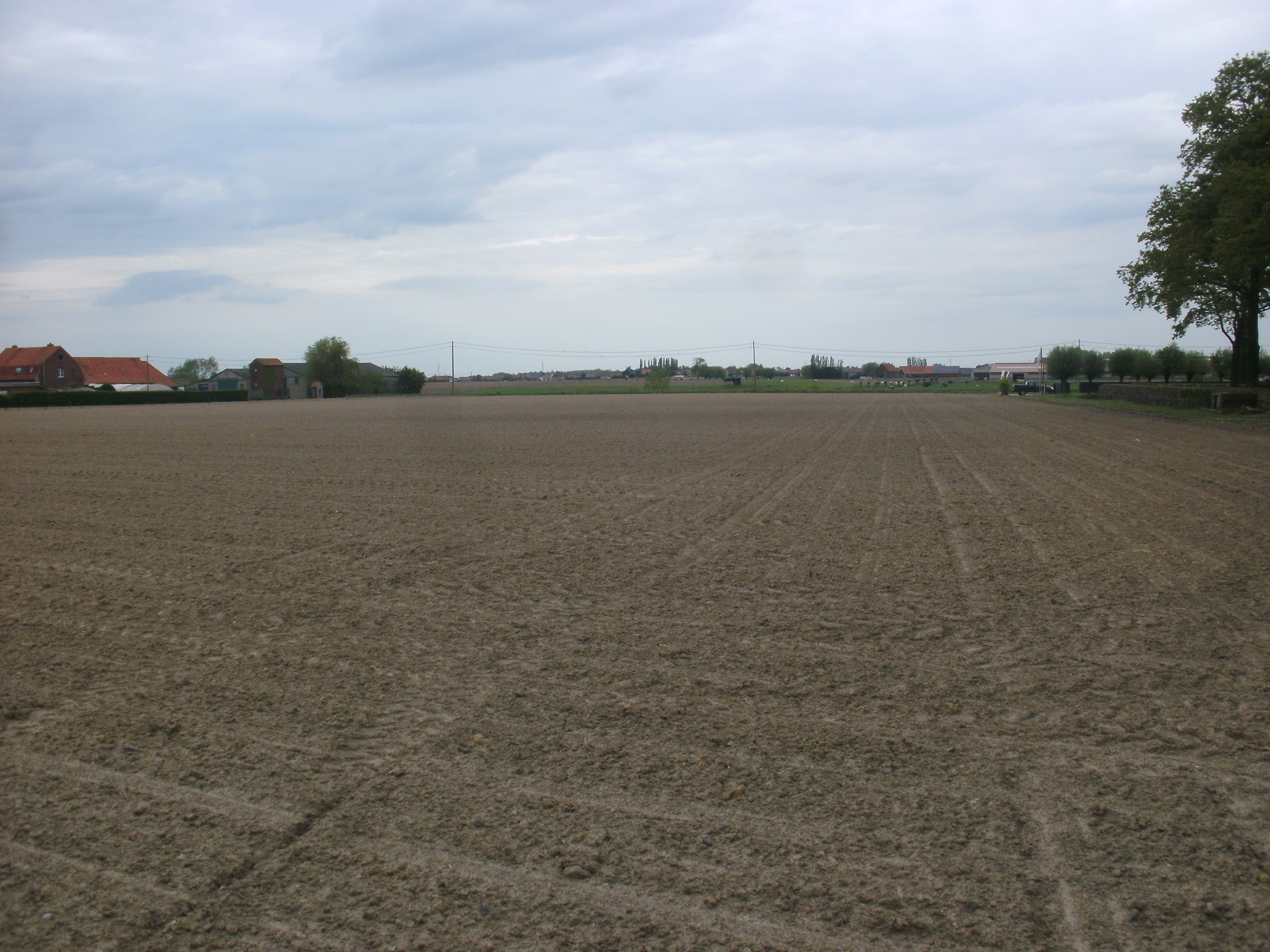
Langemark-Poelkapelle: Photograph taken from a position just west of Langemark German war cemetery, facing approximately north, towards the former location of the German trench from which the first gas attack was launched on 22 April 1915. In this area, the German trench system ran approximately from the farmhouse on the left to the group of willow trees on the right.

On 22 April 1915 at about 5:00 p.m., the 4th Army released 168 long tons (171 t) of chlorine gas on a 4.0-mile (6.5 km) front, between the hamlets of Langemark (Note: 50°55′N 02°55′E) and Gravenstafel. (Note: 50.891°N 2.979°E) This sector of the Allied line was held by the 87th Territorial Division (comprising older reservists from 10th Military District, based in Rennes), alongside the 45th Infantry Division (France) (comprising troops from the (North African) 19th Military District). The French troops in the path of the gas cloud suffered 2,000–3,000 casualties, with 800 to 1,400 fatalities. Troops fled the gas cloud,

... haggard, their overcoats thrown off or opened wide, their scarves pulled off, running like madmen, directionless, shouting for water, spitting blood, some even rolling on the ground making desperate efforts to breathe.

— Colonel Henri Mordacq, 90th Infantry Brigade, 45th Division.

A 3.7 mi (6 km) gap in the French front was left undefended. German infantry followed well behind the cloud, breathing through cotton pads soaked with sodium thiosulfate solution and occupied the villages of Langemark and Pilckem, where they dug in, even though they might have occupied Ypres almost unopposed. The Germans had captured 2,000 prisoners and 51 guns. Canadian troops defending the southern flank of the break-in identified chlorine because it smelled like their drinking water. The Germans released more chlorine gas at them the following day. Casualties were especially severe for the 13th Battalion (Royal Highlanders of Canada) of the Canadian Expeditionary Force (CEF), which was enveloped on three sides and had overextended its left flank after the Algerians of the 45th Division broke.

In an action at Kitcheners' Wood, the 10th Battalion of the 2nd Canadian Brigade was ordered to counter-attack in the gap created by the gas attack. They formed up after 11:00 p.m. on 22 April, with the 16th Battalion (Canadian Scottish) of the 3rd Brigade arriving to support the advance. Both battalions attacked with over 800 men, in waves of two companies each, at 11:46 p.m. Without reconnaissance, the battalions ran into obstacles halfway to their objective. Engaged by small-arms fire from the wood, they began an impromptu bayonet charge. The attack cleared the former oak plantation of Germans at a 75 per cent casualty rate.

Dusk was falling when from the German trenches in front of the French line rose that strange green cloud of death. The light north-easterly breeze wafted it toward them, and in a moment death had them by the throat. One cannot blame them that they broke and fled. In the gathering dark of that awful night they fought with the terror, running blindly in the gas-cloud, and dropping with breasts heaving in agony and the slow poison of suffocation mantling their dark faces. Hundreds of them fell and died; others lay helpless, froth upon their agonized lips and their racked bodies powerfully sick, with tearing nausea at short intervals. They too would die later—a slow and lingering death of agony unspeakable. The whole air was tainted with the acrid smell of chlorine that caught at the back of men's throats and filled their mouths with its metallic taste.

— Captain Alfred Oliver Pollard, The Memoirs of a VC (1932).

The Germans reported that they treated 200 gas casualties, 12 of whom died. The Allies reported 5,000 killed and 15,000 wounded. Within days the British were advised by John Scott Haldane to counter the effects of the gas by urinating into a cloth and breathing through it. Both sides set about developing more effective gas masks.

=== Battle of St. Julien (24 April – 5 May) ===
The village of St. Julien (now Sint-Juliaan; 50.890°N 2.937°E) was in the rear of the 1st Canadian Division until the poison-gas attack of 22 April, when it became the front line. Some of the first fighting in the village involved the stand of Lance Corporal Frederick Fisher of the 13th Battalion CEF's machine-gun detachment; Fisher went out twice with a handful of men and a Colt machine gun, preventing advancing German troops from passing through St. Julien into the rear of the Canadian front line. He was killed the following day.

On the morning of 24 April, the Germans released another gas cloud towards the re-formed Canadian line just west of St. Julien. Word was passed to the troops to urinate on their handkerchiefs and place them over their nose and mouth. (Note: The order is attributed to a Medical Officer, Capt. F.A.C. Scrimger. Memoirs of two individuals at the battle do not recount this episode (Nasmith, 1917 and Scott, 1922), though Nasmith, a chemist and bacteriologist who was commissioned in the C.A.M.C. as a laboratory and sanitation officer, recognised the gas on sight as chlorine and the following day began work on devising a way to counteract the gas. Urea in urine would react with chlorine, neutralising it by forming dichlorourea..) The countermeasures were insufficient and German troops took the village. The next day the York and Durham brigades of the Northumbrian Division counter-attacked, failing to secure their objectives but establishing a new line closer to the village. On 26 April the 4th, 6th and 7th Battalions of the Northumberland Brigade, the first Territorial brigade to go into action, attacked and gained a foothold in the village but were forced back, having suffered 1,954 casualties. Despite hundreds of casualties, the 2nd Battalion Royal Dublin Fusiliers participated without respite in the battles at Frezenberg and Bellewaarde. On 24 April the battalion, subjected to a German gas attack near St. Julien, was nearly annihilated.

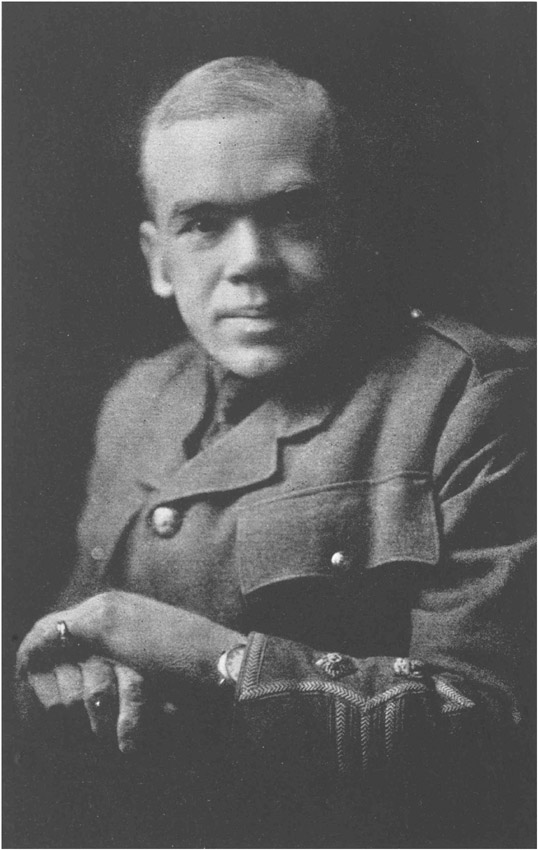
George Nasmith, the head of the field laboratory for the Canadian Expeditionary Force, advised a Canadian field ambulance officer to pass the order to use urine to counteract the gas.

Soldiers realised they were being gassed and many ran as fast as they could. An hour after the attack began, there was a 1,500-yard (1.4 km) gap in the Allied line. Fearing the chlorine, few German soldiers moved forward and the delay enabled Canadian and British troops to retake the position before the Germans could exploit the gap.

After the first German chlorine-gas attacks, Allied troops were supplied with masks of cotton pads soaked in urine; it had been discovered that the urea in the pad neutralised the chlorine. The pads were held over the face until the gas dispersed. Other soldiers preferred to use a handkerchief, sock or flannel body-belt, dampened with a sodium bicarbonate solution and tied across the mouth and nose, until the gas passed. Soldiers found it difficult to fight like this and attempts were made to develop a better means of protection against gas attacks. By July 1915, soldiers received efficient gas masks and anti-asphyxiation respirators. Private W. Hay of the Royal Scots arrived in Ypres just after the chlorine-gas attack on 22 April 1915:

We knew there was something was wrong. We started to march towards Ypres but we couldn't get past on the road with refugees coming down the road. We went along the railway line to Ypres and there were people, civilians and soldiers, lying along the roadside in a terrible state. We heard them say it was gas. We didn't know what the Hell gas was. When we got to Ypres we found a lot of Canadians lying there dead from gas the day before, poor devils, and it was quite a horrible sight for us young men. I was only twenty so it was quite traumatic and I've never forgotten nor ever will forget it.

— Private W. Hay of the Royal Scots.

=== Battle of Frezenberg (8–13 May) ===
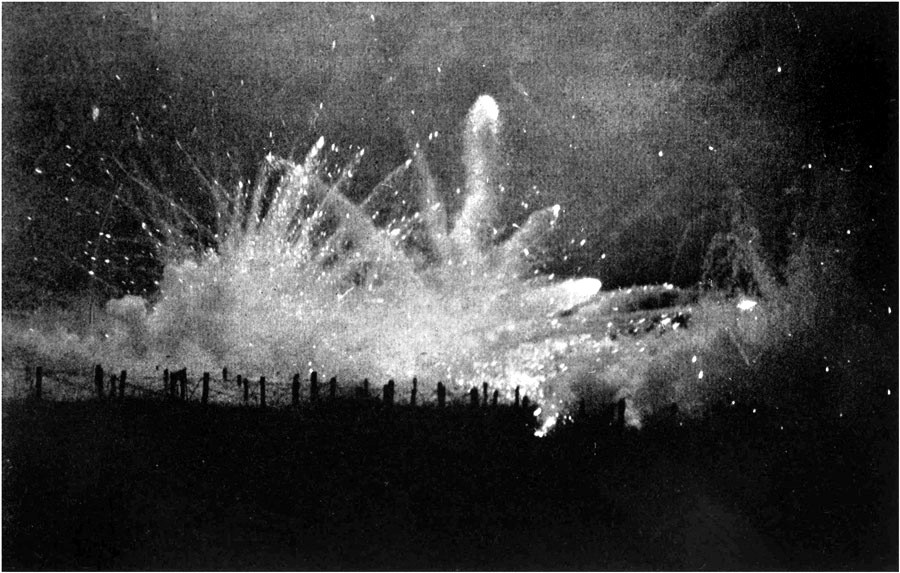
Night photograph of German barrage on Allied trenches at Ypres (probably the Second Battle of Ypres)

The Germans moved field artillery forward and assembled three corps opposite the 27th Division and 28th Division on the Frezenberg ridge (50.868°N 2.950°E). The German attack began on 8 May with a bombardment of the 83rd Brigade in trenches on the forward slope of the ridge but the first and second infantry assaults were repelled by the survivors. The third German assault of the morning pushed the defenders back. Although the neighbouring 80th Brigade repulsed the attack, the 84th Brigade was pushed back; this left a 2 mi (3.2 km) gap in the line. The Germans were prevented from advancing further by the counter-attacks of Princess Patricia's Canadian Light Infantry (PPCLI) and a night move by the 10th Brigade. The PPCLI success was costly, their 700 men were reduced to 150, who were in no shape to fight. (Note: The battle was painted by William Barnes Wollen which depicts the PPCLI as they fought to halt the German attack on Frezenberg. The original mural hangs in the Senate of the main Parliament Building in Ottawa, Ontario, Canada. In the battle, 2/3 of the regiment were either killed or wounded and all but two officers were killed or wounded. By the end of the fighting, the regiment was commanded by a lieutenant.)

=== Battle of Bellewaarde (24–25 May) ===
On 24 May the Germans released a gas attack that hit Shell Trap Farm and to the area around the north-west, which was affected the most by the attack. A report of the event by Captain Thomas Leahy, of the 2nd Royal Dublin Fusiliers, shows that their C.O. Lieutenant Colonel Arthur Loveband suspected a gas attack and had warned all company officers. Later the Germans threw up red lights over their trench, which would signal a gas release.

We had only just time to get our respirators on before the gas was over us.

— Captain Thomas Leahy

German forces managed to advance and occupy the British line to north and left of the Battalion. The Battalion was now under heavy fire from the German forces. But with shellfire and the aid from the 9th Argyll and Sutherland Highlanders they managed to hold their trenches to the end.

== Aftermath ==
=== Analysis ===
By the end of the battle, British forces had withdrawn to a new line 3 miles closer to Ypres, thereby resulting in a compression of its surrounding salient. The city, bombarded by artillery fire, was demolished. Although poison gas had been used on the Eastern Front, it surprised the Allies and about 7,000 gas casualties were transported in field ambulances and treated in casualty clearing stations. In May and June, 350 British deaths were recorded from gas poisoning. Both sides developed gas weapons and counter-measures, which changed the nature of gas warfare; the French and British used gas at the Battle of Loos in late September. Gas protection was somewhat improved with the issue of improvised respirators made from cotton waste pads impregnated with sodium hyposulphite, sodium bicarbonate and glycerin. The respirators made little difference, however, due to lack of training and the use of local contraptions and poorly made items imported from Britain. The "P helmet" (or "Tube Helmet") soaked in sodium phenate was issued by December 1915, and the PH helmet (effective against phosgene) was issued in early 1916.

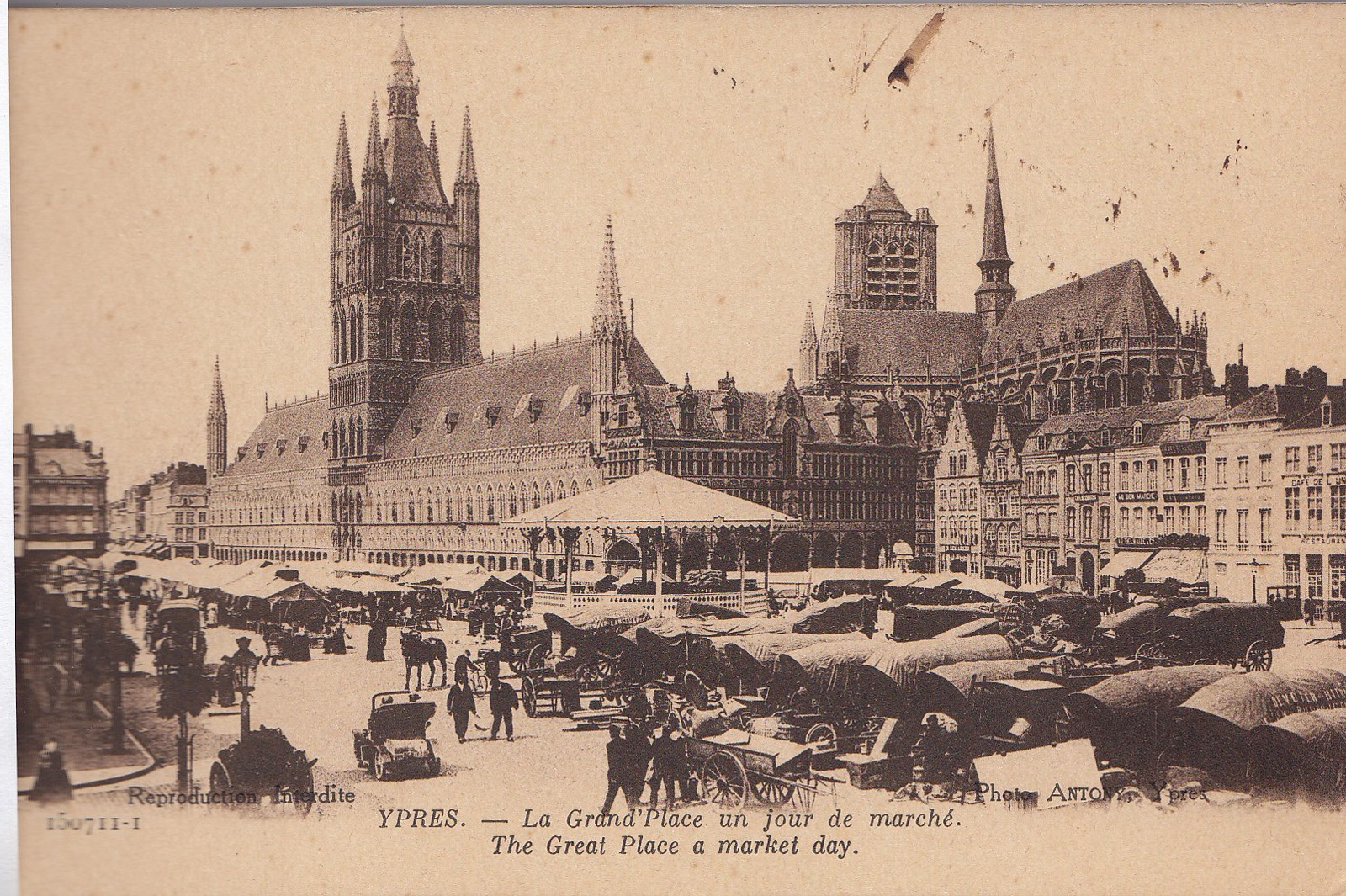
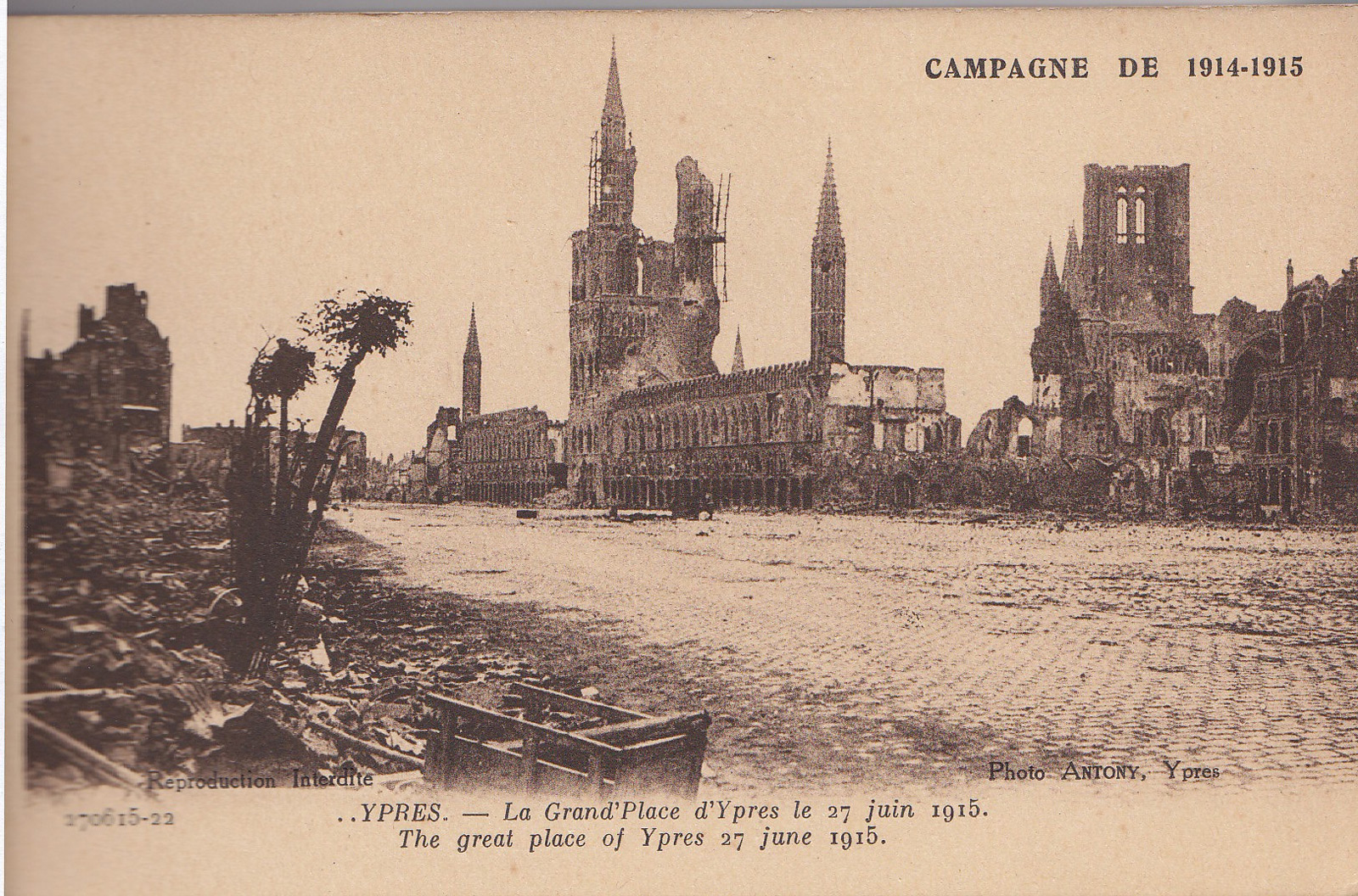
The city of Ypres before (left), and after (right) the Second Battle of Ypres. Bombarded by artillery fire, most of the city was demolished.

Although many French troops ran for their lives, others stood their ground and waited for the cloud to pass.

The Canadian Division mounted an effective defence but had 5,975 casualties by its withdrawal on 3 May. The division was unprepared for the warfare prevailing on the Western Front, where linear tactics were ineffective against attackers armed with magazine rifles and machine guns. The Canadian field artillery had been effective but the deficiencies of the Ross rifle worsened the tactical difficulties. The Canadian Division received several thousand replacements shortly after the battle. At Second Ypres, the smallest tactical unit in the infantry was a company; by 1917 it would be the section. The Canadians were employed offensively later in 1915 but not successfully. The battle was the beginning of a long period of analysis and experiment to improve the effectiveness of Canadian infantry weapons, artillery and liaison between infantry and artillery. (Note: Another Canadian division joined the British Expeditionary Force in late 1915, joined eventually by two more in 1916. The battle provided experience for many commanders such as brigade commander Arthur Currie, and others for criticism, such as Garnet Hughes. The inadequacies of training and doctrine in the early CEF was made obvious by the antique tactics used at Kitcheners' Wood and St. Julien, though tactics in the BEF would be slow to evolve.)

=== Casualties ===
After the war, German casualties from 21 April to 30 May were recorded as 34,933 by the official historians of the Reichsarchiv. In the British Official History, J. E. Edmonds and G. C. Wynne recorded British losses of 59,275 casualties, the French about 18,000 casualties on 22 April and another 3,973 from 26 to 29 April. Canadian casualties from 22 April to 3 May were 5,975, of whom about 1,000 men were killed. The worst day was 24 April, when 3,058 casualties were suffered during infantry attacks, artillery bombardments and gas discharges. In 2003, Clayton wrote that thousands of men of the 45th and 87th divisions ran from the gas but that the number of casualties was low. The Germans overran both divisions' artillery but the survivors rallied and held a new line further back. In 2010, Humphries and Maker, in their translated edition of Der Weltkrieg recorded that by 9 May, there had been more than 35,000 German casualties, 59,275 British between 22 April and 31 May and very many French casualties, 18,000 on 22 April alone. In 2012, Sheldon gave similar figures and in 2014, Greenhalgh wrote that French casualties had been exaggerated by propaganda against German "frightfulness" and that in 1998, Olivier Lepick had estimated that 800–1,400 men were killed by gas in April out of 2,000–3,000 French casualties.

Lance Sergeant Elmer Cotton described the effects of chlorine gas,

It produces a flooding of the lungs—it is an equivalent death to drowning only on dry land. The effects are these—a splitting headache and terrific thirst (to drink water is instant death), a knife edge of pain in the lungs and the coughing up of a greenish froth off the stomach and the lungs, ending finally in insensibility and death. The colour of the skin from white turns a greenish black and yellow, the tongue protrudes and the eyes assume a glassy stare. It is a fiendish death to die.

=== Subsequent operations ===
The First Attack on Bellewaarde was conducted by the 3rd Division of V Corps on 16 June 1915 and the Second Attack on Bellewaarde, a larger operation, was conducted from 25 to 26 September 1915 by the 3rd Division of V Corps and the 14th Division of VI Corps. The Battle of Mont Sorrel (2–13 June 1916) took place south of Ypres with the 20th Division (XIV Corps) and the 1st, 2nd and 3rd Canadian divisions of the Canadian Corps. The Third Battle of Ypres, also known as the Battle of Passchendaele, was fought from 31 July to 10 November 1917.

== Commemoration ==
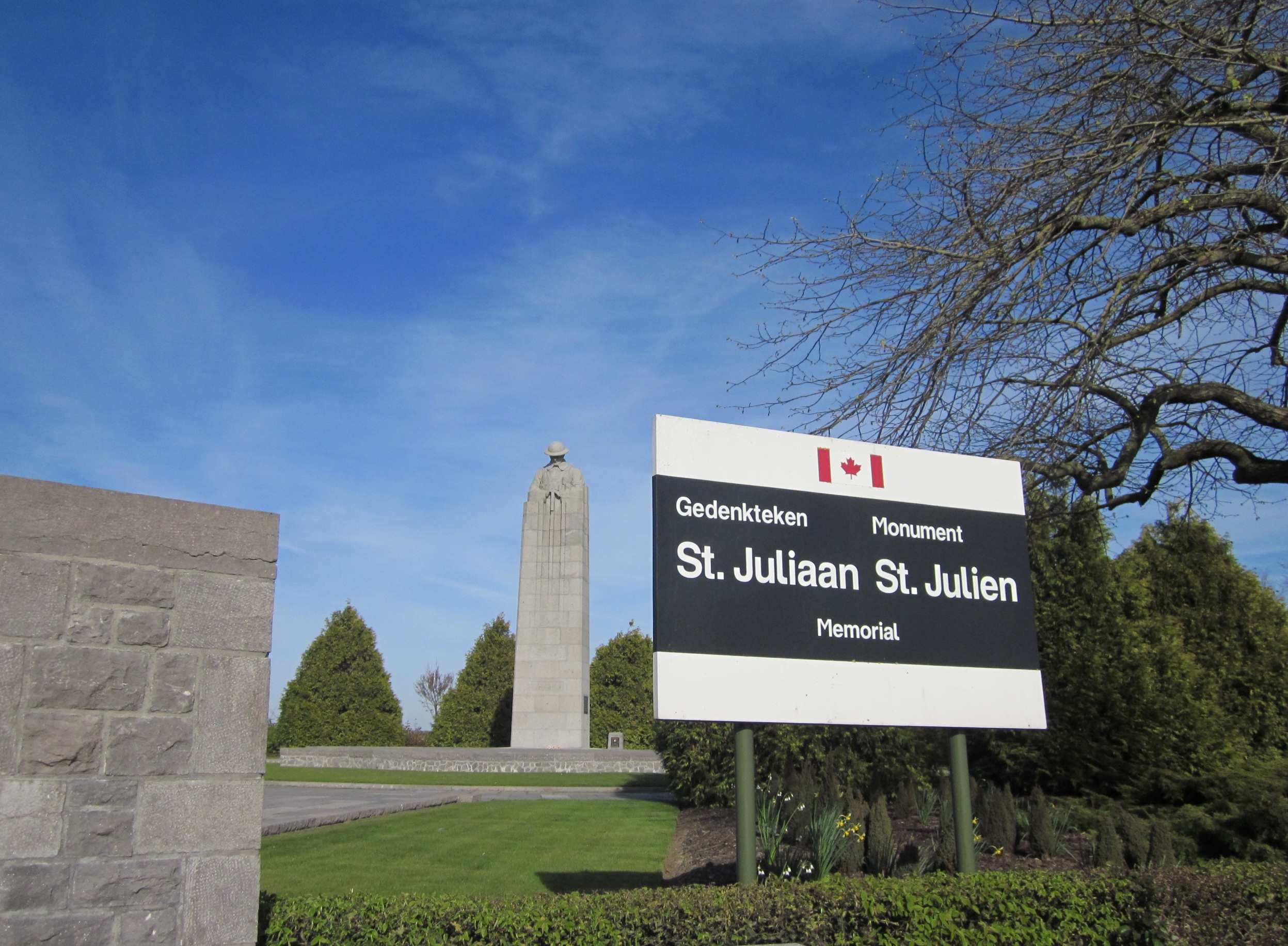
Canadian participation during the Second Battle of Ypres is commemorated at the Saint Julien Memorial.

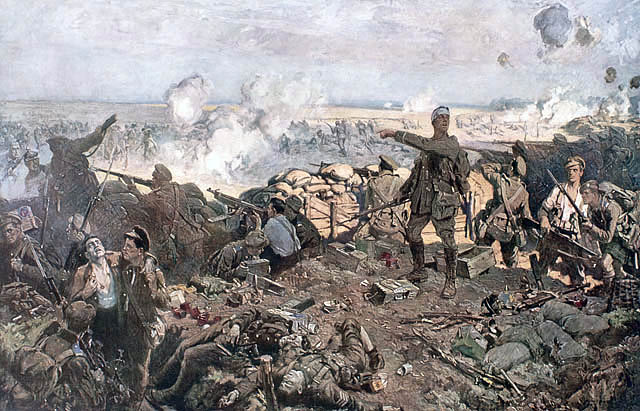
An artist's interpretation of the Second Battle of Ypres from the Allied perspective

Canadian participation in the Battle of Gravenstafel is commemorated on the Saint Julien Memorial in the village. During the Second Battle of Ypres, Lieutenant colonel John McCrae, Medical Officer of the 1st Brigade CFA, wrote "In Flanders Fields" in the voice of those who perished in the war. Published in Punch 8 December 1915, the poem is still recited on Remembrance Day and Memorial Day.

=== Victoria Cross ===
- Lance Sergeant Douglas Belcher, London Rifle Brigade (TF)
- Captain Edward Bellew, 7th Battalion, British Columbia Regiment
- Jemadar Mir Dast, 55th Coke's Rifles (Frontier Force) (attached 57th Wilde's Rifles (Frontier Force) )
- Lance Corporal Frederick Fisher, 13th Battalion Royal Highlanders of Canada
- Company Sergeant-Major Frederick William Hall, 8th Battalion, Winnipeg Rifles
- Private John Lynn, 2nd Lancashire Fusiliers
- 2nd Lieutenant William Barnard Rhodes-Moorhouse, No. 2 Squadron RFC
- Captain Francis Alexander Caron Scrimger (Canadian Army Medical Service), 14th Battalion, Royal Montreal Regiment
- Corporal Issy Smith, 1st Manchester Regiment
- Private Edward Warner, 1st Bedfordshire Regiment

== See also ==
- First Battle of Ypres
- Chemical weapons in World War I
- Saint Julien Memorial
- Battle of Passchendaele
- List of Canadian battles during the First World War
