= Winnipeg Light Infantry =

The Winnipeg Light Infantry
- Active: 1885–1888, 1912–1955
- Country: Canada
- Branch: Canadian Militia (1885–1888, 1912–1940); Canadian Army (1940–1958)
- Type: Light infantry
- Role: Infantry
- Size: One battalion
- Part of: Non-Permanent Active Militia (1912–1940); Royal Canadian Infantry Corps (1942–1955)
- Garrison/HQ: Winnipeg, Manitoba
- Motto: Nulli secundus (Latin for 'second to none')
- Anniversaries: Battle of Kitcheners' Wood
- Engagements: North-West Rebellion; First World War; Second World War
- Battle honours: See #Battle honours

The Winnipeg Light Infantry was an infantry regiment of the Non-Permanent Active Militia of the Canadian Militia (now the Canadian Army). In 1955, the regiment was amalgamated with the Royal Winnipeg Rifles.

== Lineage ==
=== The Winnipeg Light Infantry ===
- Originated on 1 April 1912, in Winnipeg, Manitoba, as the 106th Regiment, Winnipeg Light Infantry.
- Redesignated on 12 March 1920, as The Winnipeg Light Infantry.
- Redesignated on 15 December 1936, as The Winnipeg Light Infantry (Machine Gun).
- Redesignated on 18 March 1942, as the 2nd (Reserve) Battalion, The Winnipeg Light Infantry (Machine Gun).
- Redesignated on 1 June 1945, as The Winnipeg Light Infantry (Machine Gun).
- Redesignated on 1 April 1946, as The Winnipeg Light Infantry.
- Amalgamated on 30 June 1955, with the Royal Winnipeg Rifles.

== Perpetuations ==
=== North West Rebellion ===
- 91st Winnipeg Battalion of Light Infantry (1885–1888)

=== Great War ===
- 10th Battalion (Canadians), CEF
- 61st Battalion (Winnipeg), CEF
- 101st Battalion (Winnipeg Light Infantry), CEF
- 222nd Battalion, CEF
- 226th Battalion (Men of the North), CEF

== History ==
=== Early history ===
==== 91st Winnipeg Light Infantry Battalion (1885–1888) ====
On 10 April 1885, a battalion of light infantry at Winnipeg was authorized to be formed and was mobilized for active service during the North West Rebellion. On 15 May 1885, the battalion was redesignated as the Winnipeg Light Infantry Battalion. The battalion served in the Alberta Column of the North West Field Force and on 18 September 1885, the battalion was removed from active service. The Winnipeg Light Infantry Battalion was retained on the order of battle of the Non-Permanent Active Militia, and on 2 April 1886 the battalion was redesignated as the 91st Winnipeg Light Infantry Battalion. On 23 November 1888, the battalion was disbanded.

==== 106th Regiment, Winnipeg Light Infantry ====
On 1 April 1912, the 106th Regiment, Winnipeg Light Infantry, was authorized. Its regimental headquarters and all companies were in Winnipeg.

=== First World War ===
Details of the 106th Regiment, Winnipeg Light Infantry, were placed on active service on 6 August 1914 for local protection duties.

On 10 August 1914, the 10th Battalion (Canadians), CEF, was authorized, and on 29 September 1914 the battalion embarked for Great Britain. On 14 February 1915, the battalion disembarked in France where it fought as part of the 2nd Canadian Infantry Brigade, 1st Canadian Division, in France and Flanders until the end of the war on 11 November 1918. On 15 September 1920, the 10th Battalion was disbanded.

On 20 April 1915, the 61st Battalion (Winnipeg), CEF, was authorized, and on 5 April 1915 the battalion embarked for Great Britain. After its arrival in the UK, the battalion provided reinforcements to the Canadian Corps in the field. On 7 July 1916, the battalion's personnel were absorbed by the 11th Reserve Battalion, CEF. On 17 July 1917, the 61st Battalion was disbanded.

On 22 December 1915, the 101st Battalion (Winnipeg Light Infantry), CEF, was authorized, and on 29 June 1916 the battalion embarked for Great Britain. After its arrival in the UK, on 13 July 1916, the battalion's personnel were absorbed by the 17th Reserve Battalion, CEF, to provide reinforcements to the Canadian Corps in the field. On 12 October 1917, the 101st Battalion was disbanded.

On 15 July 1916, the 222nd Battalion, CEF, was authorized, and on 15 November 1916 the battalion embarked for Great Britain. After its arrival in the UK, the battalion provided reinforcements to the Canadian Corps in the field. On 2 January 1917, the battalion's personnel were absorbed by the 19th Reserve Battalion, CEF. On 1 September 1917, the 222nd Battalion was disbanded.

On 15 July 1916, the 226th Battalion (Men of the North), CEF, was authorized, and on 16 December 1916 the battalion embarked for Great Britain. After its arrival in the UK, the battalion provided reinforcements to the Canadian Corps in the field. On 7 April 1917, the battalion's personnel were absorbed by the 14th Reserve Battalion, CEF. On 27 July 1917, the 226th Battalion was disbanded.

=== 1920s–1930s ===
On 15 March 1920, as a result of the reorganization of the Canadian Militia following the Otter Commission, the 106th Regiment, Winnipeg Light Infantry, was redesignated as The Winnipeg Light Infantry.

On 15 December 1936, as a result of the 1936 Canadian Militia Reorganization, the Winnipeg Light Infantry was reorganized as an infantry battalion (machine gun) and redesignated as The Winnipeg Light Infantry (Machine Gun).

=== Second World War ===
On 26 August 1939, details of the Winnipeg Light Infantry (Machine Gun) were called out on service, and on 1 September 1939 were placed on active service under the designation The Winnipeg Light Infantry (Machine Gun), CASF, for local protection duties. On 31 December 1940, the details called out on active service were disbanded.

On 1 January 1941, details of the regiment were again called out on service as the 1st (Reserve) Battalion, The Winnipeg Light Infantry (Machine Gun), but they were disbanded the same day.

On 18 March 1942, the regiment mobilized the 1st Battalion, The Winnipeg Light Infantry, CASF, for active service. The battalion served in Canada in a home defence role as part of the 19th Canadian Infantry Brigade, 8th Canadian Infantry Division; the 16th Canadian Infantry Brigade, 7th Canadian Infantry Division; and the 14th Canadian Infantry Brigade, 6th Canadian Infantry Division. On 3 January 1945, the battalion embarked for Great Britain, and after its arrival in the UK, the 1st Battalion was disbanded on 10 January 1945, to provided reinforcements to the Canadian Army in the field.

== Alliances ==
United Kingdom - The Durham Light Infantry (1914–1955)

== Battle honours ==
=== North West Rebellion ===
- North West Canada, 1885

=== Great War ===
- Ypres, 1915, '17 (Note: Selected to be borne on colours and appointments)
- Gravenstafel
- St. Julien
- Festubert, 1915
- Mount Sorrel
- Somme, 1916
- Thiepval
- Ancre Heights
- Arras, 1917, '18
- Vimy, 1917
- Arleux
- Hill 70
- Passchendaele
- Amiens
- Scarpe, 1918
- Drocourt-Quéant
- Hindenburg Line
- Canal du Nord
- Pursuit to Mons
- France and Flanders, 1915–18

Honorary distinction: oak leaf shoulder badge for the actions of the 10th Battalion, CEF, at the Battle of Kitcheners' Wood on 22/23 April 1915.

== Notable members ==
- Lieutenant Colonel William Osborne Smith
- Captain John "Jack" Douglas Verner. Awarded Bar to Military Cross for his bravery and leadership during the attack on Dodu Wood, 8 August 1918, while serving with the 43rd Battalion, Cameron Highlanders of Canada. The citation states: "During an attack his company [D] came under heavy fire in the assembly area. He rallied his men and led them forward. The attack to which he was committed necessitated two complete changes of direction. A heavy mist prevailed, obliterating all features; nevertheless he handled his company in such a way under machine-gun fire that, without any error, they reached their objective by a flanking movement. During the operation a battery of 5.9's with open sights started firing at advancing Tank and his company. He manoeuvred his Lewis guns to enfilade the enemy guns, and captured five guns, six officers, and seventy men." Verner had served with the 106th Regiment, Winnipeg Light Infantry for two months prior to his service overseas with the CEF.
- Company Sergeant Major Frederick William Hall, VC
