= Art Grant =

Art Grant or art grant may refer to:

- Art Grant (baseball) (fl. 1920s), American baseball player
- Art Grant (ice hockey) (1919–1943), Canadian ice hockey player
- A grant given to artists

== See also ==
- Arthur Grant (disambiguation)
