= Noël de Rastel de Rocheblave =

Canadian politician

Noël de Rastel de Rocheblave (December 25, 1767 – December 10, 1805) was a merchant and political figure in Lower Canada. He represented Surrey in the Legislative Assembly of Lower Canada from 1804 to 1805.

He was born in Ste. Genevieve, Missouri, the son of Philippe-François de Rastel de Rocheblave and Marie-Michelle Dufresne, and settled in Montreal, where he became a trader.

He died in office in Montreal at the age of 37 from injuries received on a ship during a storm on Lake Champlain. De Rastel de Rocheblave had been discussing trade on the Missouri River with American authorities.

He was the brother of Pierre de Rastel de Rocheblave.
