= Philippe-François de Rastel de Rocheblave =

Canadian politician

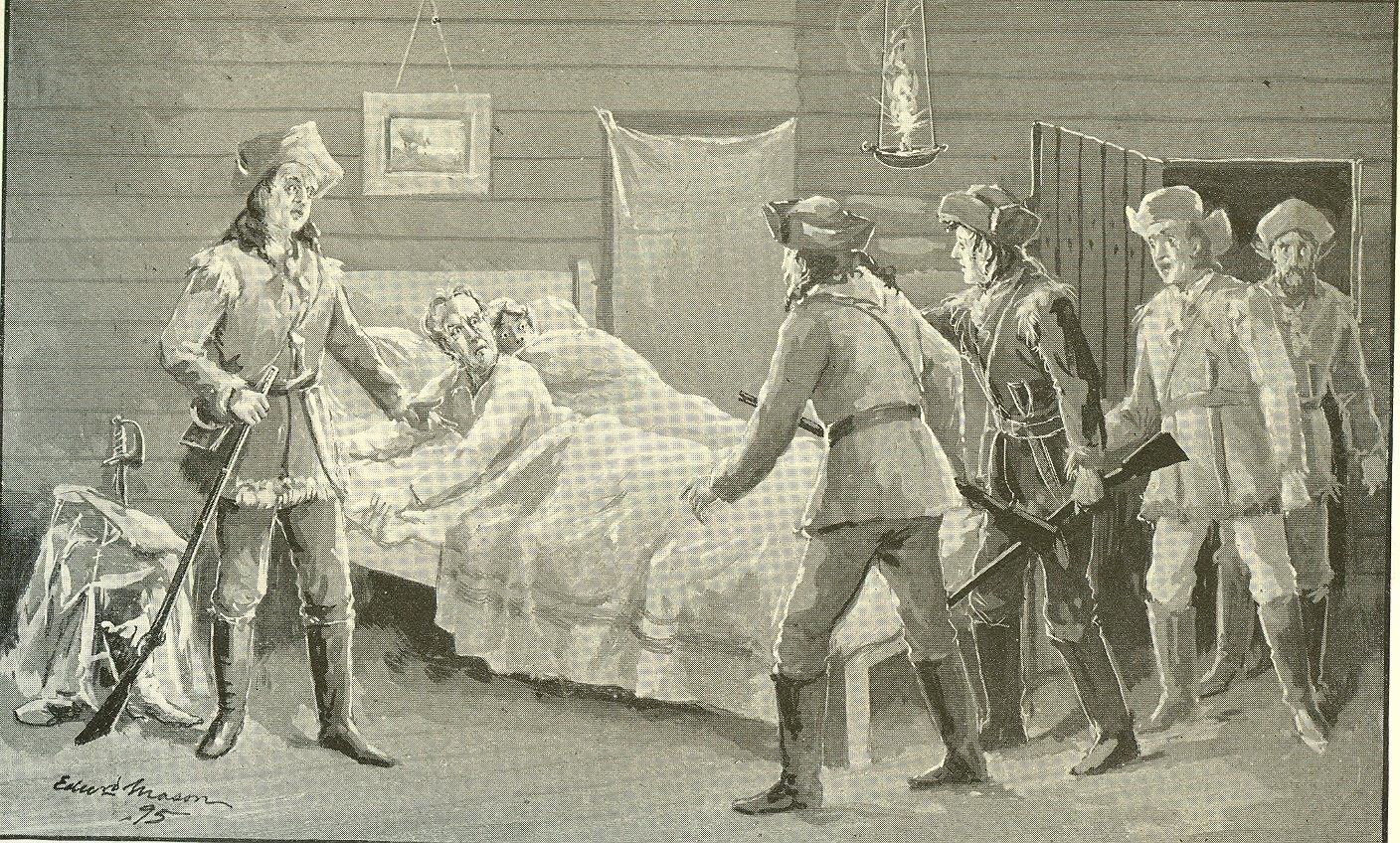
- Philippe de Rocheblave, the commandant of Fort Gage, captured in bed, with his wife, by Colonel George Rogers Clark and the Illinois Regiment, Virginia State Forces, in 1778, who seized the lightly guarded British outpost, of Kaskaskia, in the Illinois Country
- Born: March 23, 1727; Savournon, Hautes-Alpes, France
- Died: April 3, 1802 (aged 75); Quebec City
- Other names: Philippe de Rocheblave, Chevalier de Rocheblave
- Occupations: soldier, colonial army officer, trader, colonial militia officer, fur trader, politician
- Spouse: Marie Louise Dufresne
- Children: Noël de Rastel de Rocheblave (son), Pierre de Rastel de Rocheblave (son)
- Parent(s): Jean Joseph de Rastel de Rocheblave and Diane Elizabeth Dillon
- Relatives: Jacques Michel du Fresne (father-in-law), Marie Francoise Henry (father-in-law)

Philippe-François de Rastel de Rocheblave also, known as, Philippe de Rocheblave and the Chevalier de Rocheblave (March 23, 1727 – April 3, 1802), was a soldier and businessman in the Illinois Country, of Upper Louisiana, and later, a political figure in Lower Canada.

== Early life ==
Philippe-François de Rastel de Rocheblave was born in Savournon, Hautes-Alpes, France.

== Illinois Country, Upper Louisiana Territory ==
Philippe de Rocheblave served in the French Army. Rocheblave led French troops in New France, during the Seven Years' War also, known as, the French and Indian War in North America, serving as a lieutenant at Fort de Chartres in the Illinois Country. He later established a business at Kaskaskia. After the British took control of Kaskaskia, he became the commandant of Fort Sainte-Geneviève, in the Illinois Country for New Spain. In 1774, Rocheblave took command of Kaskaskia, for the British.

== American Revolutionary War ==
In 1778, during the American Revolutionary War, Colonel George Rogers Clark, commander of the Illinois Regiment, Virginia State Forces, captured Kaskaskia for the Americans and took Philippe de Rocheblave prisoner. Rocheblave was sent to Virginia, where he eluded parole and fled to the British forces in New York City.

== Post-War years and death ==
Coat of Arms of Philippe-François de Rastel de Rocheblave

According to Robert MacIntosh's 2006 book "Earliest Toronto", after the American Revolutionary War ended, Rocheblave first settled in Upper Canada, where Lord Dorchester, the Governor-General approved a grant of 1000 acres on the banks of the Humber River. However, the grant stalled when it fell to John Graves Simcoe, the Lieutenant Governor of Upper Canada, and his appointees, to process it, and specify the actual acres that should have been his.

Philippe de Rocheblave then brought his family to Montreal; they later settled at Varennes in 1789. He became involved in the fur trade in the Detroit region. In 1796, Rocheblave was elected to the Legislative Assembly of Lower Canada for Surrey and was re-elected in 1796 and 1800, serving until his death in 1802. The sons of Rocheblave, Noël and Pierre, also, became members of the legislative assembly. Pierre de Rastel de Rocheblave also, became a member of the Lower Canada Legislative Council. Philippe de Rocheblave died on April 3, 1802, in Quebec City, Lower Canada.
