= Arthur Grant =

Arthur Grant may refer to:

- Arthur James Grant (1862–1948), English historian
- Sir Arthur Grant, 10th Baronet (1879–1931), of Monymusk, Aberdeen
- Arthur Grant (cinematographer) (1915–1972), British cinematographer
- Art Grant (ice hockey) (1919–1943), Canadian ice hockey player
- Art Grant (baseball) (fl. 1922), catcher in the American Negro league
- Arthur Grant (footballer) (born 1957), former Scottish football winger
