= Jock Anderson =

Jock Anderson may refer to:

- Jock R. Anderson (born 1941), Australian agricultural economist
- John Kinloch Anderson (1924–2015), classicist
- Jocko Anderson (1893–1960), Canadian soccer and ice hockey player

== See also ==
- John Anderson
