= Rod Smith (ice hockey) =

Canadian ice hockey player

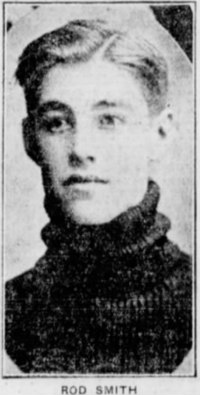
- Smith circa 1916
- Born: June 28, 1894; Selkirk, Manitoba, Canada
- Died: November 25, 1961 (aged 67)
- Height: 5 ft 9 in (175 cm)
- Position: Defence
- Played for: Saskatoon Crescents; Winnipeg 61st Battalion
- Playing career: 1914–1923

Roderick Angus Smith (June 28, 1894 – November 25, 1961) was a professional ice hockey player. He played with the Saskatoon Crescents of the Western Canada Hockey League between 1922 and 1924. Smith was also a member of the Winnipeg 61st Battalion team which captured the 1916 Allan Cup as amateur champions of Canada. While on the Winnipeg 61st Battalion team Smith played alongside fellow defenseman and future Hockey Hall of Fame inductee Bullet Joe Simpson.

He died in 1961 and is buried at Riverside Memorial Park in Regina.
