= Bullet Joe Simpson =

Canadian ice hockey player (1893–1973)

- Hockey Hall of Fame, 1963
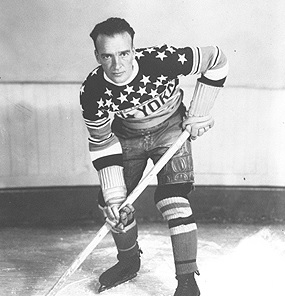
- Born: August 13, 1893 Selkirk, Manitoba, Canada
- Died: December 26, 1973 (aged 80) Coral Gables, Florida, U.S.
- Height: 5 ft 10 in (178 cm)
- Weight: 175 lb (79 kg; 12 st 7 lb)
- Position: Defence
- Shot: Right
- Played for: Edmonton Eskimos; New York Americans
- Playing career: 1921–1931

Harold Edward Joseph "Bullet Joe" Simpson (August 13, 1893 – December 26, 1973) was a Canadian professional ice hockey defenceman who played for the Edmonton Eskimos and New York Americans between 1920 and 1931. He later served as coach of the Americans between 1932 and 1935. Simpson was inducted into the Hockey Hall of Fame.

== Biography ==
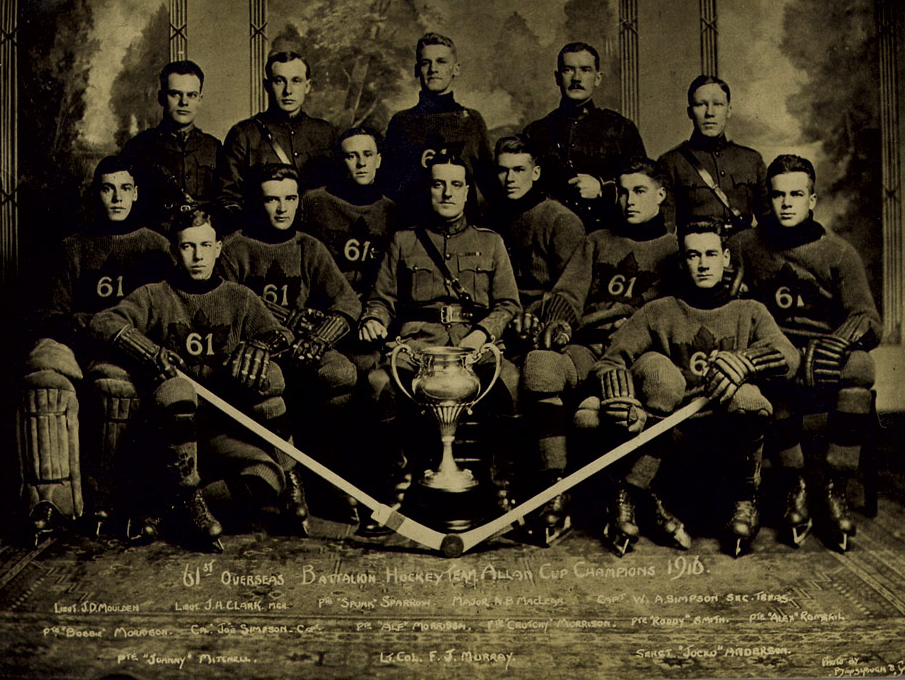
Simpson, sitting third from left, in 1916 with the Winnipeg 61st Battalion and the Allan Cup.

Simpson was born in Selkirk, Manitoba. Nicknamed "Bullet" because of very fast skating ability, he started his career in the Canadian west. He learned the sport of ice hockey on a frozen slough, near his house, during the early 1900s. As Simpson once stated, Manitoba Avenue ran east and west in the middle of Selkirk. The boys living in the north end were the northern team and those south of Manitoba Avenue made up the southern team. After graduating from the Selkirk Fishermen Juniors, Simpson played senior ice hockey with the Winnipeg Victorias of the NHA in 1914–15.

On August 26, 1915 Simpson enlisted in the Canadian military, joining the 31st Battalion. Remaining in Canada, he transferred to the 61st Battalion and played the 1915–16 season with their hockey team, helping them win the 1916 Allan Cup, the amateur championship of Canada. Two weeks after winning the Cup Simpson was sent overseas, and arrived in the United Kingdom in early April 1916. He was hospitalized in August 1916 with gonorrhea, but was sent to the Western Front in time to take part in the Battle of Somme, where he was wounded in the left leg and back, being hospitalized again. In July 1917 Simpson was promoted to lieutenant, and in August 1917 was awarded the Military Medal. He was dismissed from the service on February 28, 1918 by finding of the General Court Martial, but no further details exist in his record, and five days later he was back in his position. He was wounded again in August 1918, in the right shoulder, and once again was sent back for hospitalization. He was discharged in early November 1918, just before the Armistice.

Back in Manitoba by early 1919, Simpson played the last four games of the ice hockey season for his hometown Selkirk Fisherman Seniors of the Manitoba Seniors League. He started again for the Seniors the following year. In 1920, at 178 cm (5 ft 10 in) and 79 kilograms (175 lb), the right-handed defenceman's break came in a Winnipeg pool room when Kenny MacKenzie of the Big 4's Edmonton Eskimos offered him $3,000 to turn professional. Simpson joined the Eskimos in 1920, signing as a free agent on November 4.

In 1921–22, he won a Western Hockey League first team all-star berth. He was named to the first team on three occasions and to the second team once. At that time, Newsy Lalonde called Simpson the greatest living hockey player. His end-to-end rushes were legendary and without comparison.

When the Western Hockey League ceased operations at the end of the 1924–25 season, Simpson's contract was purchased by the New York Americans of the National Hockey League. Simpson, John Morrison and Roy Rickey were traded September 18, 1925 for $10,000. Simpson played six seasons with the Amerks and in 1931 took on the role of team coach for three years. He later managed the New Haven and Minneapolis teams.

Simpson moved to Florida in 1938 to promote ice hockey, becoming the head coach of the Miami Clippers of the short-lived Tropical Hockey League. He later suffered a heart attack that kept him inactive for two years. Another retired ice hockey player and Floridian came to his aid. Art Coulter hired him to work at the Coulter White's hardware store in Coral Gables, Florida, a position he held until 1965.

Simpson was inducted into the Hockey Hall of Fame in 1963. He died December 25, 1973, in Coral Gables at the age of 80. In 1975, he was inducted into Canada's Sports Hall of Fame. Simpson was also inducted into the Manitoba Sports Hall of Fame in 2013.

In 1994, the Marine Museum of Manitoba in Selkirk was donated a 1963 flat-bottomed freighter which is on display named the Joe Simpson.

== Career statistics ==
=== Regular season and playoffs ===
			Regular season					Playoffs
Season	Team	League	GP	G	A	Pts	PIM	GP	G	A	Pts	PIM
1912–13	Winnipeg Strathconas	MHL	—	—	—	—	—	2	0	0	0	0
1913–14	Selkirk Fishermen	WJRHL	11	12	0	12	—	—	—	—	—	—
1914–15	Winnipeg Victorias	MHL	8	8	2	10	16	—	—	—	—	—
1915–16	Winnipeg 61st Battalion	MHL	8	9	2	11	24	2	1	0	1	4
1915–16	Winnipeg 61st Battalion	Al-Cup	—	—	—	—	—	5	4	2	6	2
1918–19	Selkirk Fishermen	MHL	4	0	0	0	0	4	3	2	5	2
1919–20	Selkirk Fishermen	MHL	10	19	4	23	6	—	—	—	—	—
1920–21	Edmonton Eskimos	Big-4	15	2	6	8	21	—	—	—	—	—
1921–22	Edmonton Eskimos	WCHL	25	21	12	33	15	2	1	0	1	2
1922–23	Edmonton Eskimos	WCHL	30	15	14	29	6	2	0	0	0	0
1922–23	Edmonton Eskimos	St-Cup	—	—	—	—	—	2	0	1	1	0
1923–24	Edmonton Eskimos	WCHL	30	10	4	14	6	—	—	—	—	—
1924–25	Edmonton Eskimos	WCHL	28	11	12	23	16	—	—	—	—	—
1925–26	New York Americans	NHL	32	2	2	4	2	—	—	—	—	—
1926–27	New York Americans	NHL	43	4	2	6	39	—	—	—	—	—
1927–28	New York Americans	NHL	24	2	0	2	32	—	—	—	—	—
1928–29	New York Americans	NHL	43	3	2	5	29	2	0	0	0	0
1929–30	New York Americans	NHL	44	8	13	21	41	—	—	—	—	—
1930–31	New York Americans	NHL	42	2	0	2	13	—	—	—	—	—
WCHL totals			113	57	42	99	43	4	1	0	1	2
NHL totals			228	21	19	40	156	2	0	0	0	0

== Head coaching record ==
			Regular season					Playoffs
Season	Team	League	GC	W	L	T	Finish	GC	W	L	T	Result
1932–33	New York Americans	NHL	48	15	22	11	4th in Canadian	—	—	—	—	—
1933–34	New York Americans	NHL	48	15	23	10	4th in Canadian	—	—	—	—	—
1934–35	New York Americans	NHL	48	12	27	9	4th in Canadian	—	—	—	—	—
1938–39	Miami Clippers	THL	13	7	6	0	2nd, THL	—	—	—	—	—
NHL totals			144	42	72	30	—	0	0	0	0	—

== Awards and achievements ==
- Allan Cup championship (1916)
- WCHL First All-Star Team (1922)
- Inducted into the Hockey Hall of Fame in 1963
- Honoured Member of the Manitoba Hockey Hall of Fame

== Bibliography ==
- Hockey Hall of Fame (2003). Honoured Members: Hockey Hall of Fame. Bolton, Ontario: Fenn Publishing. ISBN 1-55168-239-7.
- MacLeod, Alan Livingstone (2018), From Rinks to Regiments: Hockey Hall-of-Famers and the Great War, Victoria, British Columbia: Heritage House, ISBN 978-1-77203-268-0

Preceded by Eddie Gerard	Head coach of the New York Americans; 1932–35	Succeeded by Rosie Helmer
