= 90th Battalion (Winnipeg Rifles), CEF =

Infantry battalion of the Great War Canadian Expeditionary Force

The 90th Battalion (Winnipeg Rifles), CEF, was an infantry battalion of the Great War Canadian Expeditionary Force. The 90th Battalion was authorized on 22 December 1915 and embarked for Great Britain on 31 May 1916, where on 19 July 1916 its personnel were absorbed by the 11th Reserve Battalion, CEF, to provide reinforcements to the Canadian Corps in the field. The battalion disbanded on 1 September 1917.

The 90th Battalion recruited in, and was mobilized at, Winnipeg, Manitoba.

The 90th Battalion was commanded by Lt.-Col. W.A. Munro from 2 June 1916 to 19 July 1916.

The 90th Battalion was awarded the battle honour THE GREAT WAR 1916.

The 90th Battalion, CEF is perpetuated by the Royal Winnipeg Rifles.

== Sources ==
Canadian Expeditionary Force 1914–1919 by Col. G.W.L. Nicholson, CD, Queen's Printer, Ottawa, Ontario, 1962
