= Emory Sparrow =

Canadian ice hockey player (1897–1965)

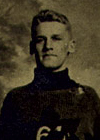
- Sparrow in 1916 with the Winnipeg 61st Battalion.
- Born: September 15, 1897 Hartney, Manitoba, Canada
- Died: February 2, 1965 (aged 67)
- Height: 5 ft 11 in (180 cm)
- Weight: 180 lb (82 kg; 12 st 12 lb)
- Position: Right wing
- Shot: Left
- Played for: Winnipeg 61st Battalion; Regina Capitals; Edmonton Eskimos; Calgary Tigers; Boston Bruins
- Playing career: 1921–1926

William Emery Sparrow (September 15, 1897 – February 2, 1965) was a Canadian professional ice hockey forward who played 8 games in the National Hockey League for the Boston Bruins during the 1924–25 season. He also played with the Regina Capitals, Edmonton Eskimos and Calgary Tigers in the Western Canada Hockey League. As a professional player, he spelled his name Emory, and was commonly known by the nickname Spunk Sparrow.

Before he appeared on the professional hockey scene, Sparrow won the Canadian amateur championship trophy Allan Cup in 1916 with the Winnipeg 61st Battalion.

== Career statistics ==
=== Regular season and playoffs ===
			Regular season					Playoffs
Season	Team	League	GP	G	A	Pts	PIM	GP	G	A	Pts	PIM
1913–14	St. John's College	WJrHL	—	—	—	—	—	—	—	—	—	—
1914–15	Winnipeg Argonauts	WSrHL	—	—	—	—	—	—	—	—	—	—
1915–16	Winnipeg 61st Battalion	MHL	7	4	4	8	20	—	—	—	—	—
1917–18	Winnipeg Somme	MHL	8	14	7	21	22	—	—	—	—	—
1918–19	Winnipeg Argonauts	MHL	9	22	10	32	6	—	—	—	—	—
1919–20	Moose Jaw Maple Leafs	SSHL	10	11	1	12	30	2	1	0	1	2
1920–21	Moose Jaw Maple Leafs	SSHL	13	15	6	21	56	4	3	0	3	6
1921–22	Regina Capitals	WCHL	14	10	2	12	6	4	0	0	0	6
1921–22	Regina Capitals	West-PO	—	—	—	—	—	2	0	0	0	5
1922–23	Regina Capitals	WCHL	23	6	4	10	33	—	—	—	—	—
1923–24	Edmonton Eskimos	WCHL	23	11	6	17	34	—	—	—	—	—
1924–25	Calgary Tigers	WCHL	16	7	8	15	48	2	0	0	0	2
1924–25	Boston Bruins	NHL	8	0	0	0	4	—	—	—	—	—
1925–26	Calgary Tigers	WHL	11	3	2	5	34	—	—	—	—	—
1925–26	Edmonton Eskimos	WHL	17	11	2	13	32	2	0	0	0	6
1926–27	Calgary Tigers	PHL	32	26	25	51	58	2	2	0	2	2
1927–28	Minneapolis Millers	AHA	5	1	1	2	8	—	—	—	—	—
1927–28	Regina Capitals	PHL	16	9	7	16	14	—	—	—	—	—
1928–29	Philadelphia Arrows	Can-Am	23	2	2	4	22	—	—	—	—	—
WCHL/WHL totals			104	48	24	72	177	8	0	0	0	14
NHL totals			8	0	0	0	4	—	—	—	—	—

== Awards and achievements ==
- Allan Cup (1916)
- PHL First All-Star Team (1927)
