= Nile Voyageurs =

- Active: 1884–1885
- Disbanded: April 1885
- Country: Canada
- Allegiance: British Empire
- Size: ~ 390 men
- Engagements: Mahdist War: Nile Expedition; Battle of Kirbekan

Commanders
- Commanding Officer: Col. Frederick Charles Denison

The Nile Voyageurs were a force of Canadian volunteers who served in the Sudan with British forces as part of the Nile Expedition from 1884 to 1885. Though they were civilian volunteers, serving as boatmen for the British Army, they can be considered Canada’s first overseas contingent of war volunteers.

16 voyageurs died on active service during the campaign, and as Canada’s first overseas casualties they are commemorated in the Book of Remembrance in Ottawa.

Nile Expedition Roll of Honour 1884 – 1885
Soldier	Casualty	Date of casualty
Richard Burgess	Died of disease	September 26, 1884
Louis Capitaine	Drowned near Semneh	October 30, 1884
John Morris	Drowned	November 16, 1884
Michael Brennan	Died of dysentery	November 21, 1884
George Fletcher	Drowned near Ambigoll	November 23, 1884
John Edward Faulkner	Died from drowning	November 29, 1884
William Doyle	Drowned near Ambigoll	December 13, 1884
Solomon Bigneault	Died of small-pox	December 17, 1884
Leon Chatelain	Drowned near Semneh	December 18, 1884
Alexander Michael Armstrong	Died of fever	January 3, 1885
William James O’Rourke	Died in train accident	February 4, 1885
Leon Pilon	Died in train accident	February 4, 1885
John Andrew Sherlock	Died of disease	March 26, 1885
Patrick Leonard	Died from enteric fever	April 10, 1885
Daniel McLean	Died of disease	April 16, 1885
Col. William Nassau Kennedy	Died from small-pox	May 3, 1885

== See also ==
- Corps of Canadian Voyageurs
