= Corps of Canadian Voyageurs =

Corps of Canadian Voyageurs; Provincial Commissariat Voyageurs
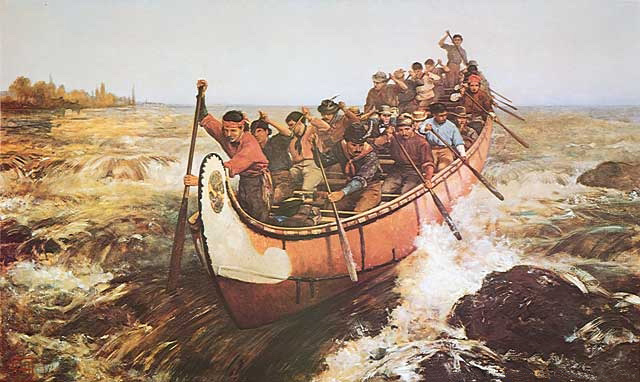
- Shooting the Rapids 1879
- Active: September 1812 – March 1815
- Country: British Canada
- Allegiance: United Kingdom
- Branch: British Army (1812–1813); British Commissariat Department (1813–1815)
- Type: logistics
- Role: transportation
- Size: 400
- Motto: Perseverance
- Engagements: War of 1812: Battle of St. Regis; Battle of Lacolle Mills

Commanders
- Notable commanders: William McGillivray

The Corps of Canadian Voyageurs was raised in 1812 on the initiative of the North West Company, whose members became its officers and men. It was disbanded in 1813, and its responsibilities were assumed by the Provincial Commissariat Voyageurs. The army wanted to put the Corps into uniform, but that was impractical due to its duties. The army-issued weaponry were also unusuable and the men used their own frontier weapons. The Corps was known for its lack of discipline.

== Creation ==
The Corps was raised in September 1812 by the British Army as a military water transportation unit. Its mission was to maintain supply lines between Montreal and the western posts. The corps was disbanded in March 1813, and its responsibilities were assumed by the Canadian branch of the British Commissariat Department, part of HM Treasury, under the name Provincial Commissariat Voyageurs. This corps was itself disbanded in March 1815.

== Organization ==
The Corps of Voyageurs was organized on the initiative of the North West Company as a water transportation unit, and its bourgeois and engagés became the officers and men of the corps.

The Provincial Commissariat Voyageurs had one lieutenant-colonel, one major, one captain, ten lieutenants, ten conductors (sergeants acting as guides), and about 400 private men.

The army wanted to put the corps into uniform, but that was impractical due to its duties. Instead of a uniform the men of the corps wore the dress of the ordinary civilian voyageurs.

== Contributions to the war effort ==
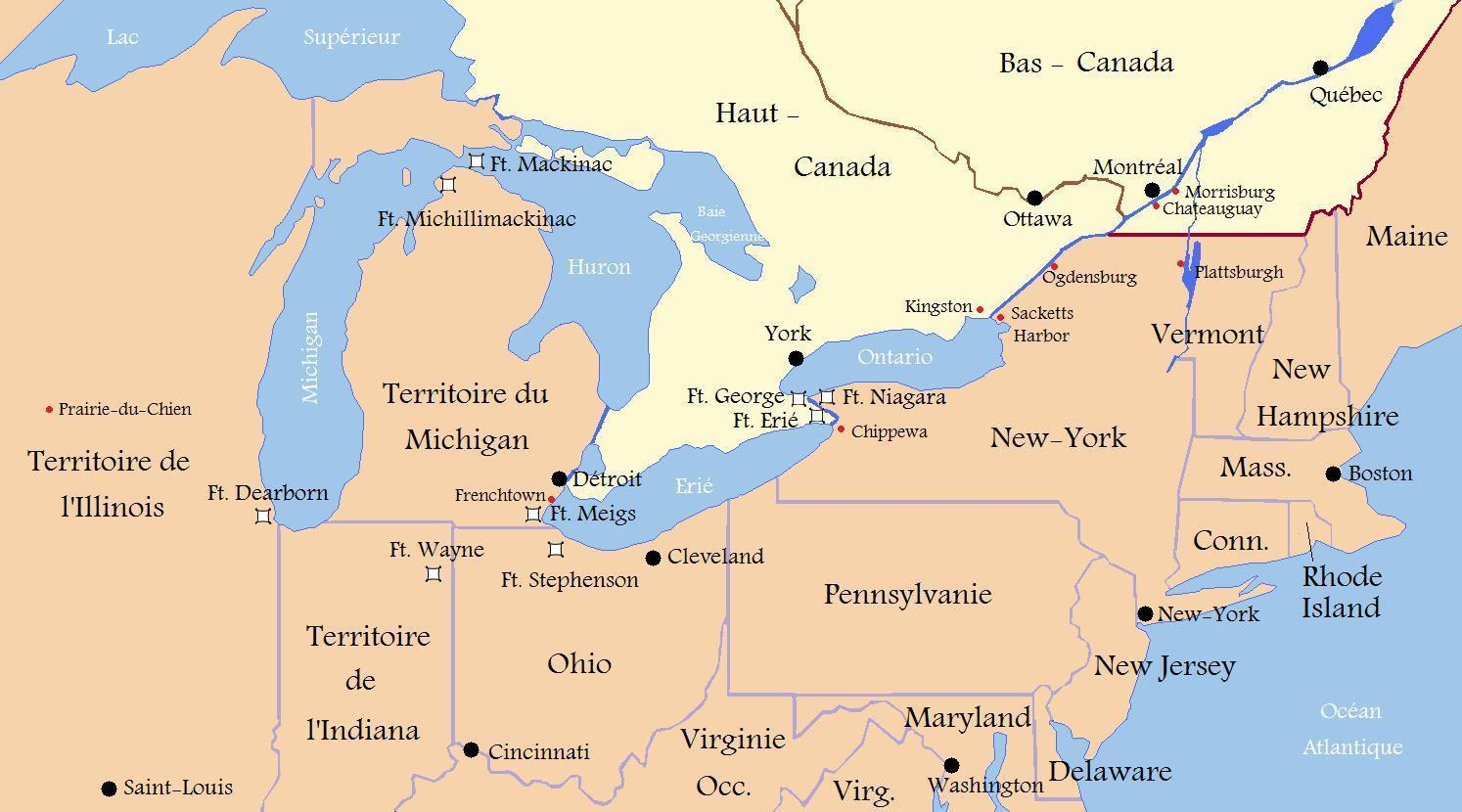
The Voyageurs' most important contribution to the War of 1812 was the supply of the western posts.

The Voyageurs' most important contribution to the War of 1812 was the supply of the western posts; the strategic result was that the British Army retained control of Fort Mackinac, a central point for supplying the British Indian allies in the Northwest Territory.

== Weapons ==
The army-issued swords, pikes and pistols were useless in the wilderness, and they were thrown away or sold, and the men used their own frontier weapons. They were issued with Brown Bess muskets, axes and knives.

== Discipline ==
The corps was known for its lack of discipline, at least in comparison with the iron discipline required by the British Army. However, it fulfilled an absolutely essential function, in the "wilderness war".

== Officers ==
- William McGillivray, lieutenant-colonel, commanding officer.
- Angus Shaw, major
- Archibald Norman McLeod, major
- William McKay, captain
- Pierre de Rastel de Rocheblave, captain

== Perpetuation within the Canadian Army ==
The Canadian Grenadier Guards perpetuates the honours of both corps.

== Re-enactment unit ==
The historical re-enactment group of the Canadian Corps of Voyageurs was organized in 1975 by John Robertson, then armourer at Old Fort William. After forty years as a re-enactment group, as of 2018 it was still a strong volunteer group (over 45 members) with Fort William Historic Park, Thunder Bay, Ontario. It is a family-orientated historical re-enactment group that portrays early 1800s military, voyageur militia and family life. The Corps provides guards of honour in charity events, providing heritage colour and firing salutes for visiting VIPs. The Corps provide safety training to new and old members to be confident in the proper use, care and maintenance of firearms and equipment. Members are encouraged to take an active role and participate in the group activities and camp life. Not only is the Corps a historical re-enactment group, it is also a social group interested in the past and informing the public about Canadian history.

== See also ==
- Canadian units of the War of 1812
- Nile Voyageurs
