= Winnipeg 61st Battalion =

Canadian military ice hockey team

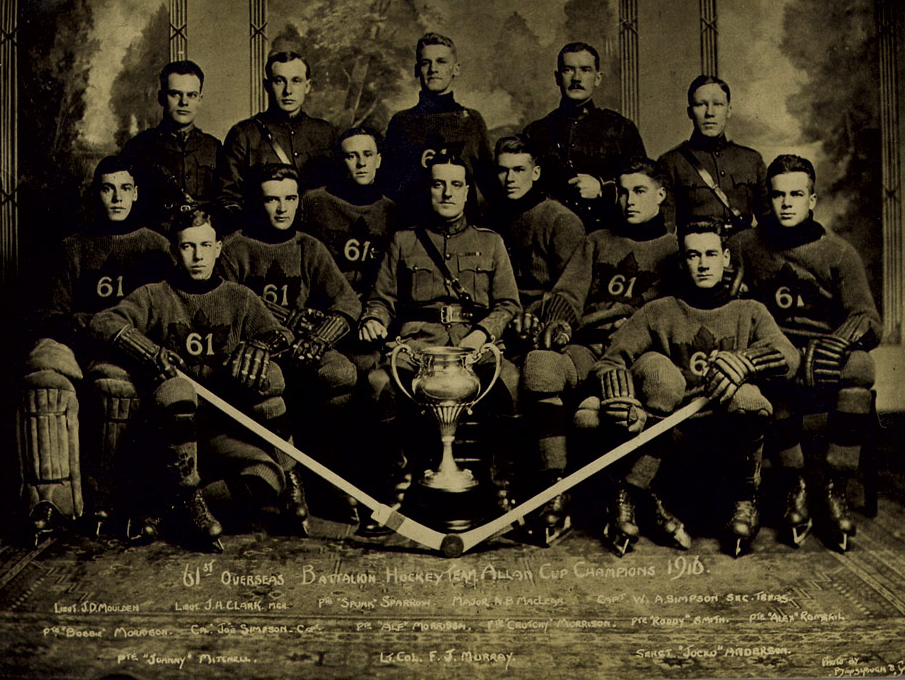
Winnipeg 61st Battalion with the Allan Cupin 1916

Winnipeg 61st Battalion was a Canadian ice hockey team. Composed of players from the 61st Battalion of the Canadian Expeditionary Force created to participate in World War I, the team won the Pattison Trophy in 1915–16 as Manitoba provincial champions, defeating the defending champion Winnipeg Monarchs.

The Winnipeg Monarchs protested when the Winnipeg 61st Battalion were chosen to defend the Allan Cup as Winnipeg Patriotic Hockey League champions, since the Monarchs considered the patriotic games to be exhibitions. The Manitoba Amateur Hockey Association subsequently upheld Claude C. Robinson's decision that the 61st Battalion defend the Allan Cup, but that the Monarchs would be given the opportunity to defend the cup only if the soldiers had to leave Winnipeg due to military service. The Winnipeg 61st Battalion won the Allan Cup by defeating challenges from Fort William, Ontario and the Regina Victorias.

Due to the World War I, the team did not compete in the following season. With the challenge system discarded in favour of a playoff between eastern and western teams, Winnipeg was the last to win the Cup this way. The 1916 Winnipeg 61st Battalion were inducted into the Manitoba Hockey Hall of Fame in the team category.

== 1916 Allan Cup roster ==
Roster: Lt. J.D. Moulden, Lt. J.A. Clark-Mgr., Pte. "Spunk" Sparrow, Major N.B. MacLean, Capt. W.A. Simpson (Sec'Treas.), Pte. Bobby Morrison (Goal), Pte. Johnny Mitchell, Cpl. Joe Simpson, Pte. Alf Morrison, Lt.-Col. F.J. Murray, Pte. John "Crutchy" Morrison, Pte. Roddy Smith, Sgt. Jocko Anderson and Pte. Alex Romeril.

== National Hockey League alumni ==
Alumni of the Winnipeg 61st Battalion who played in the National Hockey League:

- John "Crutchy" Morrison
- Joe Simpson
- Emory Sparrow
- Hal Winkler
