= William Nassau Kennedy =

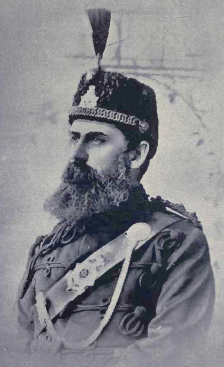

2nd Mayor of Winnipeg
- In office 1875–1876
- Preceded by: Francis Evans Cornish
- Succeeded by: Thomas Scott

Personal details
- Born: 28 April 1839 Newcastle, Upper Canada
- Died: 3 May 1885 (aged 46) London, England

William Nassau Kennedy (28 April 1839 – 3 May 1885) was the second Mayor of Winnipeg, Manitoba from 1875 to 1876. He was the first commander of The Royal Winnipeg Rifles.

== Biography ==
Kennedy was born in Newcastle, Upper Canada (now Newcastle, Ontario) and was the second of six children of John Kennedy, a housepainter and lieutenant-colonel in the militia, and Catharine Lambert.

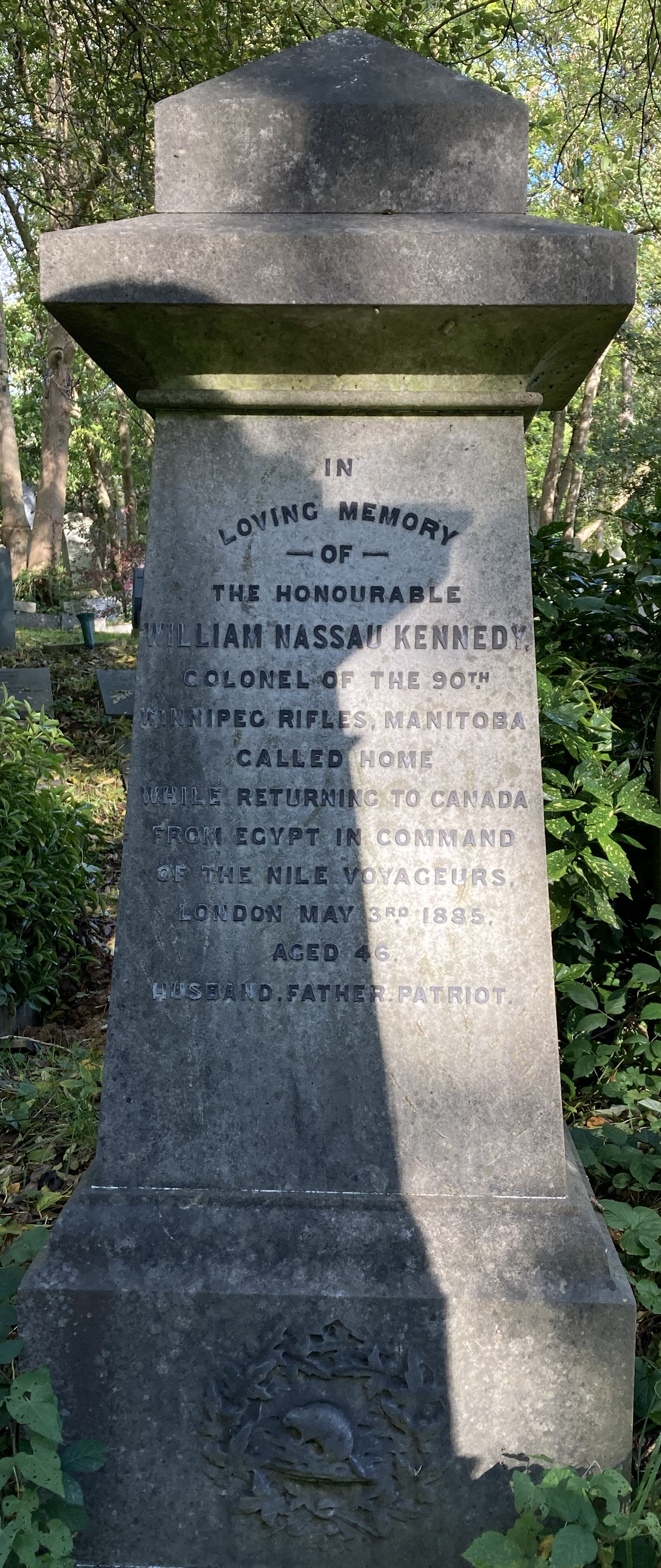
Grave of William Nassau Kennedy in Highgate Cemetery

Kennedy enlisted in the Peterborough Rifle Company in 1857. He was commissioned as an ensign in 1865 and served during the Fenian raids. In 1867, Kennedy was gazetted as a captain in the newly formed 57th Peterborough Battalion of Infantry. In 1870 he joined the Wolseley expedition to fight the Red River Rebellion in what is now Manitoba.

He remained in Manitoba after the fighting ended.

He served in the Nile Expedition with the Nile Voyageurs. He was returning to Canada to command the 90th Winnipeg Rifles in the North-West Rebellion.

He died in London from smallpox contracted in Sudan on 3 May 1885 and was buried on the eastern side of Highgate Cemetery, almost opposite the tomb of Karl Marx.
