= List of New York Americans head coaches =

This is a list of New York Americans head coaches. The Americans had nine different head coaches during the team's existence. Tommy Gorman is the most successful head coach in team's history, accumulating a .488 winning percentage during two stints as head coach. Red Dutton is the longest-tenured head coach for the team and lead the Americans to the Stanley Cup playoffs in three seasons.

== Key ==
#	Number of coaches
GC	Games coached
W	Wins
L	Losses
T	Ties (no longer applicable after the 2005–06 season)
OTL	Overtime losses (includes shootout losses after 2005–06)
Pts	Points
Win%	Winning percentage

== Coaches ==
#	Name	Dates	Regular season							Playoffs				Achievements	Ref
#	Name	Dates	GC	W	L	T	OTL	Pts	Win%	GC	W	L	T	Achievements	Ref
1	Tommy Gorman	1925–1926	36	12	20	4	—	28	.389	—	—	—	—		
2	Newsy Lalonde	1926–1927	44	17	25	2	—	36	.409	—	—	—	—		
3	Shorty Green	1927–1928	44	11	27	6	—	28	.318	—	—	—	—		
—	Tommy Gorman	1928–1929	44	19	13	12	—	50	.568	2	0	1	1		
4	Lionel Conacher	1929–1930	44	14	25	5	—	33	.375	—	—	—	—		
5	Eddie Gerard	1930–1932	92	34	40	18	—	86	.467	—	—	—	—		
6	Bullet Joe Simpson	1932–1935	144	42	72	30	—	114	.396	—	—	—	—		
7	Rosie Helmer	1935–1936	48	16	28	7	—	39	.406	5	2	3	0		
8	Red Dutton	1936–1940	192	66	97	29	—	161	.419	11	4	7	0		
9	Art Chapman	1940–1942	96	24	58	14	—	62	.323	—	—	—	—		

== Notes ==
1. The win–loss percentage is calculated using the formula: $\frac{Wins+\frac{1}{2}Ties}{Games}$
