= Rosie Helmer =

Canadian ice hockey, baseball coach (1890–1951)

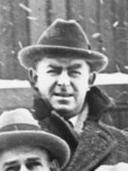
Rosie Helmer (1924)

Edward Robert "Rosie" Helmer (April 19, 1890 – December 25, 1951) was a Canadian ice hockey and baseball coach.

Helmer was born in Windsor, Ontario, but grew up in Sarnia, Ontario. He developed into an outstanding baseball player and travelled to western Canada to participate in the minor leagues. While playing in Fort William, Ontario (now part of Thunder Bay), he began his hockey career, and he subsequently became interested in attaining a coaching position. He spent one season behind the bench of a junior league team in Swift Current, Saskatchewan before moving to Calgary, Alberta in 1919. He spent eight years coaching the Calgary Tigers. During his tenure, he also put together a barnstorming baseball team of top players from the province. After the demise of this franchise, Helmer took over the Winnipeg Maroons.

While coaching Calgary, Helmer maintained a close friendship with Red Dutton, who went on to become coach and general manager of the New York Americans of the National Hockey League (NHL). Helmer served in multiple capacities with this team and was the Americans' head coach during the 1935–36 NHL season.

Beginning in 1940, Helmer had a series of strokes, which forced his retirement from hockey management. He died in 1951.

== Coaching career ==
Season	Team	League	Regular season						Post season
Season	Team	League	G	W	L	T	Points	Division rank	Result
1935–36	New York Americans	NHL	48	16	25	7	39	3rd in Canadian	Lost in quarterfinals

Preceded by Bullet Joe Simpson	Head coach of the New York Americans; 1935–36	Succeeded by Red Dutton
