= Jocko Anderson =

Canadian athlete (1893–1960)

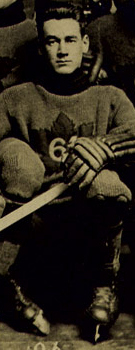
- Anderson in 1916 with the Winnipeg 61st Battalion
- Born: October 4, 1893 St. Peters, Manitoba, Canada
- Died: July 22, 1960 (aged 66)
- Height: 5 ft 7 in (170 cm)
- Weight: 150 lb (68 kg; 10 st 10 lb)
- Position: Left wing
- Played for: Winnipeg 61st Battalion; Calgary Tigers; Victoria Cougars
- Playing career: 1910–1926

John Wilberforce "Jocko" Anderson (October 4, 1893 – July 22, 1960) was a Canadian two-sport athlete from Canada. In Winnipeg, he won the 1915 Connaught Cup with Winnipeg Scottish FC in soccer and the 1916 Allan Cup with the Winnipeg 61st Battalion in ice hockey. As a professional hockey player, he won the 1925 Stanley Cup with the Victoria Cougars.

Anderson played in the Western Canada Hockey League with the Calgary Tigers and in the Pacific Coast Hockey Association with the Victoria Cougars. In soccer, he also played for the Calgary Callies.

== Accomplishments ==
- Allan Cup – 1916 (Winnipeg 61st Battalion)
- Stanley Cup – 1925 (Victoria Cougars)
