= John Morrison (ice hockey, born 1895) =

Canadian ice hockey player

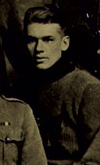
- Morrison in 1916 with the Winnipeg 61st Battalion.
- Born: March 4, 1895 Selkirk, Manitoba, Canada
- Died: March 14, 1956 (aged 61) Selkirk, Manitoba, Canada
- Height: 5 ft 8 in (173 cm)
- Weight: 163 lb (74 kg; 11 st 9 lb)
- Position: Right wing
- Shot: Right
- Played for: Edmonton Eskimos; New York Americans
- Playing career: 1913–1932

John William "Crutchy" Morrison (March 4, 1895 - March 14, 1956) was a Canadian professional ice hockey player who played 18 games in the National Hockey League during the 1925–26 season with the New York Americans. The rest of his career, which lasted from 1913 to 1932, was spent in a variety of other leagues, including the Western Canada Hockey League, where he played for the Edmonton Eskimos. With Edmonton he played in the 1923 Stanley Cup Finals, and scored the team's only goal.

== Playing career ==
Born in Selkirk, Manitoba, Morrison played senior hockey for the Selkirk Fishermen, starting in 1913. In 1915, he enlisted with the Canadian Expeditionary Force for the First World War. Before being sent overseas, he played one season for the Winnipeg 61st Battalion to capture the Allan Cup in 1916. After his tour of duty ended in 1919, he played two more seasons of senior hockey, with Selkirk in 1919–20 and the Winnipeg Falcons for 1920–21.

Morrison joined the Edmonton Eskimos of the WCHL in 1921, and played four seasons with the club. In 1923, the Eskimos won the WCHL title and took on the defending Stanley Cup champion Ottawa Senators in Vancouver in a best-of-three series. The Eskimos were stymied by the Senators six-man defense and Morrison scored the team's only goal, in the first game. He was picked up by the New York Americans in a trade from Edmonton for the 1925–26 season and he played in 18 NHL games without any goals or points. He joined the Regina Capitals for the 1926–27 season, then played six seasons in the American Hockey Association for various teams, including the Duluth Hornets, for whom he played in his final season in 1931–32.

== Career statistics ==
=== Regular season and playoffs ===
			Regular season					Playoffs
Season	Team	League	GP	G	A	Pts	PIM	GP	G	A	Pts	PIM
1913–14	Selkirk Fishermen	MHL	10	5	0	5	—	—	—	—	—	—
1914–15	Selkirk Fishermen	MHL	—	—	—	—	—	—	—	—	—	—
1915–16	Winnipeg 61st Battalion	WSrHL	8	7	2	9	8	3	1	0	1	6
1915–16	Winnipeg 61st Battalion	Al-Cup	—	—	—	—	—	2	1	0	1	0
1919–20	Selkirk Fishermen	MHL	9	6	5	11	6	—	—	—	—	—
1920–21	Winnipeg Falcons	MHL	10	9	4	13	2	—	—	—	—	—
1921–22	Selkirk Fishermen	MHL	5	10	2	12	4	—	—	—	—	—
1921–22	Edmonton Eskimos	WCHL	17	8	2	10	4	2	0	0	0	0
1922–23	Edmonton Eskimos	WCHL	26	10	2	12	5	2	0	0	0	0
1922–23	Edmonton Eskimos	St-Cup	—	—	—	—	—	2	1	0	1	0
1923–24	Edmonton Eskimos	WCHL	23	1	2	3	2	—	—	—	—	—
1924–25	Edmonton Eskimos	WCHL	27	5	2	7	11	—	—	—	—	—
1925–26	New York Americans	NHL	18	0	1	1	0	—	—	—	—	—
1926–27	Regina Capitals	PHL	30	20	6	26	18	2	1	0	1	2
1927–28	Duluth Hornets	AHA	32	7	3	10	8	5	0	0	0	2
1928–29	Duluth Hornets	AHA	37	10	3	13	10	—	—	—	—	—
1929–30	St. Paul Saints	AHA	45	9	4	13	10	—	—	—	—	—
1930–31	Buffalo Majors	AHA	42	6	12	18	2	—	—	—	—	—
1931–32	Buffalo Majors	AHA	24	3	2	5	6	—	—	—	—	—
1931–32	Duluth Hornets	AHA	16	2	0	2	2	7	0	0	0	0
AHA totals			196	37	24	61	38	12	0	0	0	2
WCHL totals			93	24	8	32	22	4	0	0	0	0
NHL totals			18	0	1	1	0	—	—	—	—	—

== Awards and achievements ==
- Allan Cup Championship (1916)
- Honoured Member of the Manitoba Hockey Hall of Fame
