= 190th Battalion (Winnipeg Rifles), CEF =

Unit in the Canadian Expeditionary Force during WWI

The 190th (Winnipeg Rifles) Battalion, CEF was a unit in the Canadian Expeditionary Force during the First World War. It was authorized July 16, 1916. Based in Winnipeg, Manitoba, the unit began recruiting during the winter of 1916/17 in that city and surrounding district. After sailing to England in May 1917, the battalion was absorbed into the 18th Reserve Battalion on May 14, 1917. The battalion was disbanded September 1, 1917. The 190th (Winnipeg Rifles) Battalion, CEF had one Officer Commanding: Lieut-Col. G. K. Watson. Battle Honours awarded: Great War 1917.

This battalion is perpetuated by the Royal Winnipeg Rifles.
