= Francis Evans Cornish =

Canadian politician

Francis Evans Cornish QC
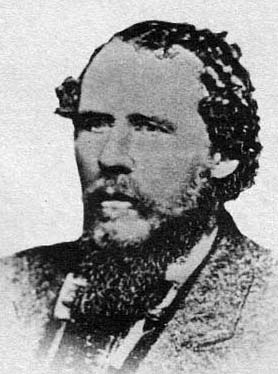

1st Mayor of Winnipeg
- In office 1874–1874
- Succeeded by: William Nassau Kennedy

Mayor of London, Ontario
- In office 1861–1864

Personal details
- Born: February 1, 1831 London, Upper Canada
- Died: November 28, 1878 (aged 47) Winnipeg, Manitoba

Francis Evans Cornish QC (February 1, 1831 – November 28, 1878) was a Canadian politician. He served as Mayor of London, Canada West, in the early 1860s, became the first Mayor of Winnipeg in 1874, and was for a time a member of the Legislative Assembly of Manitoba.

== Early life and education ==
Cornish was born in London (then in Upper Canada), to a family that had moved to Canada from England twelve years earlier. He was educated in London, articled in law, and was called to the bar of Canada West in 1855. At age 26, he was appointed a QC. He was a successful lawyer, and was involved in the local masonic and Orange lodges.

== Political career ==
London was incorporated as a city in 1855, and Cornish was elected as an alderman in its seventh ward three years later. He was re-elected in 1859 and 1860. In May 1860, Cornish ran as a Conservative candidate in the riding of Middlesex East, in a by-election for the Province of Canada's legislature. He was defeated by R. Craik, a Liberal. There was a second Conservative candidate in the race, and some suspect that Cornish deliberately split the Conservative vote to permit a Liberal victory.

Cornish was elected Mayor of London in 1861, and held the position for the next four years. He was responsible for resolving a scandal at the city's hospital, and oversaw the city's first serious efforts to reduce fire hazards in its central region. The most notorious incident of his tenure as mayor occurred in 1863, when he physically attacked a British commander who boasted of an affair with Cornish's wife. He was convicted of assault, and fined eight dollars.

Cornish often resorted to dubious means to win elections, and received assistance from members of the local Orange Order. He was defeated for the mayoralty in 1865, when his opponent David Glass successfully petitioned for the local militia to oversee the civic proceedings.

Cornish ran for the Legislative Assembly of Ontario in the 1871 provincial election, but was defeated by John Carling, a local brewer and fellow Conservative. Cornish's loyalty to the Conservative Party was ambiguous in this period, and some sources believe he favoured the Liberals.

Although he was re-elected to London's municipal council in 1871, Cornish had little interest in the city. He moved to Winnipeg in 1872, and assisted in developing of the new province's legal system. He became a spokesman for recent Ontario immigrants, and forged a political alliance with John Christian Schultz's Canadian Party. Schultz's followers opposed the province's "consensus government" and were often involved in violent activities against the local Métis population.

Against the wishes of prime minister John A. Macdonald, Cornish coordinated the arrest of Ambroise-Dydime Lepine in 1873. Lepine had been the adjutant-general in Louis Riel's provisional government, and his arrest sparked bitter divisions among the province's English-speaking and French-speaking communities. Cornish served as leader for the prosecution in Lepine's trial, which resulted in a conviction and a death sentence (later commuted to a minor jail sentence).

Winnipeg was formally incorporated as a city in 1873, and Cornish declared himself a candidate for the city's mayoralty. On January 5, 1874, he defeated William F. Luxton by a margin of 383 votes to 179. It may be noted that there were only 382 eligible voters in the city at the time, but that property owners were allowed to vote in every civic poll in which they owned property. Cornish's followers exploited this rule to their benefit.

In the 1874 provincial election, Cornish declared himself a candidate for the Manitoba legislature in the constituency of Poplar Point. He ran as an opponent of premier Robert A. Davis's ministry (which was primarily supported by francophones), and defeated his sole opponent, Robert Hastie, by a margin of 92 votes to 65. Cornish subsequently allowed his name to stand for re-election as mayor of Winnipeg, but paid little attention to the campaign. He was defeated by William Kennedy, 218 votes to 164.

Early in 1875, opposition leader John Norquay entered the cabinet of Premier Davis and brought several of his Anglophone followers to the government side. Cornish did not join Norquay, and emerged as the leader of the parliamentary opposition. He was again accused of fomenting violence in an 1876 municipal election, and was fined twenty dollars for his role in an altercation.

Cornish was asked to run as a Liberal candidate in the 1878 federal election of 1878, but declined. His party affiliation was still ambiguous in this period. He declared himself a "National" in federal politics, and is generally considered to have been a Conservative, albeit of an independent stripe, during his time in the Manitoba legislature. Like John Christian Schultz, he gradually left his Ontario Conservative background, and sometimes aligned himself with a "Liberal" position when opposing the provincial government.

Cornish was elected as an alderman to the municipal council of Winnipeg in 1878. He was also planning to run for re-election to the provincial legislature, but died from cancer of the stomach in November.

In his history of Manitoba's legal system, Bruce MacFarlane describes Cornish as "by most accounts a brash and rude man, but extremely intelligent. Best known as the first mayor of Winnipeg, he was also decidedly anti-Catholic, anti-Métis and especially anti-Riel".
