= Harry Helman =

Canadian ice hockey player

- Born: August 28, 1894 Ottawa, Ontario, Canada
- Died: April 22, 1971 (aged 76)
- Height: 5 ft 6 in (168 cm)
- Weight: 145 lb (66 kg; 10 st 5 lb)
- Position: Right wing
- Shot: Right
- Played for: Ottawa Senators; Saskatoon Sheiks
- Playing career: 1922–1927

Harold Herbert Helman (August 28, 1894 – April 22, 1971) was a Canadian professional ice hockey right winger who played three seasons in the National Hockey League for the Ottawa Senators between 1922 and 1925. He won the Stanley Cup in 1923. He was born in Ottawa, Ontario.

== Playing career ==
Helman played senior hockey for several teams in the Ottawa City Hockey League before joining the Ottawa Senators in 1922. He was a member of the Senators for three seasons, mostly as a substitute. He was a member of the 1923 Senators Stanley Cup winning squad. He was out of professional hockey after the 1924–25 season but joined the Saskatoon Sheiks for one season in 1926–27.

== Career statistics ==
=== Regular season and playoffs ===
			Regular season					Playoffs
Season	Team	League	GP	G	A	Pts	PIM	GP	G	A	Pts	PIM
1916–17	Ottawa Munitions	OCHL	7	0	0	0	6	—	—	—	—	—
1919–20	Ottawa GWVA	OCHL	7	4	0	4	—	—	—	—	—	—
1920–21	Ottawa Munitions	OCHL	9	4	0	4	4	1	0	0	0	10
1921–22	Ottawa Munitions	OCHL	11	4	3	7	21	—	—	—	—	—
1922–23	Ottawa Senators	NHL	24	0	0	0	5	2	0	0	0	0
1922–23	Ottawa Senators	St-Cup	—	—	—	—	—	2	0	0	0	0
1923–24	Ottawa Senators	NHL	19	1	0	1	2	—	—	—	—	—
1924–25	Ottawa Senators	NHL	1	0	0	0	0	—	—	—	—	—
1926–27	Saskatoon Sheiks	PHL	5	0	0	0	8	—	—	—	—	—
NHL totals			44	1	0	1	7	2	0	0	0	0
