= 1923 Stanley Cup Final =

1923 ice hockey championship series

	1	2	Total
Ottawa Senators (NHL)	2*	1	2
Edmonton Eskimos (WCHL)	1*	0	0
- * – Denotes overtime period(s)
- Location(s): Vancouver: Denman Arena
- Format: best-of-three
- Coaches: Ottawa: Pete Green; Edmonton: Ken McKenzie
- Captains: Ottawa: Eddie Gerard; Edmonton: Duke Keats
- Dates: March 29–31, 1923
- Series-winning goal: Punch Broadbent (11:23, first)
- Hall of Famers: Senators: Clint Benedict (1965); Georges Boucher (1960); Punch Broadbent (1962); King Clancy (1958); Jack Darragh (1962); Cy Denneny (1959); Eddie Gerard (1945); Frank Nighbor (1947); Eskimos: Duke Keats (1958); Bullet Joe Simpson (1963)

The 1923 Stanley Cup Final was contested by the NHL champion Ottawa Senators and the WCHL champion Edmonton Eskimos. The previous WCHL-PCHA playoff format was abandoned, and the Ottawa Senators now had to play first the PCHA champion Vancouver Maroons, followed by the WCHL champion Edmonton Eskimos in the Finals.

This was the last Finals series until the 1983 Stanley Cup Final to be contested by a team from Edmonton. Both games were played in Vancouver, making this the last Finals until 2020 played entirely at a neutral site (the 1924 and 1925 Final series each featured one neutral site game).

== Paths to the Finals ==
In the NHL playoff, the Senators defeated the Montreal Canadiens in a 2-game total-goal series by a close 3–2 score in the series. Billy Coutu charged Cy Denneny and Sprague Cleghorn butt-ended Lionel Hitchman in the first game and the Canadiens manager Leo Dandurand suspended both players for their actions. Odie Cleghorn and Didier Pitre did well in the two players place, but Ottawa won the series.

Ottawa brought Montreal Canadiens right wing Billy Boucher west with them in hopes that they could use him, but Frank Patrick ruled that the undermanned Senators could not use him.

The playoff format of the previous year where the PCHA champion met the WCHL champion prior to playing the NHL champion was abandoned. Therefore, for this year, the PCHA champions were given the chance to play the NHL champion in a best-of-three series. The injury-riddled Senators then defeated Vancouver three games to one in the semi-finals.

== Game summaries ==
In the first game, Edmonton was leading 1–0, on a goal by Crutchy Morrison, before the ailing Lionel Hitchman scored in the third period to tie the game. Duke Keats of Edmonton was awarded a penalty shot during the game, but failed to score. Cy Denneny, despite suffering from a concussion, scored after two minutes of overtime to win the game for the Senators.

In the second game, the Senators got a first-period goal from Harry Broadbent and made it stand to the end of the game, playing six-man defence. The shots were recorded; 21, 14 and 13 for a total of 48 by the Senators, and 25, 18, and 25 for a total of 68 by Edmonton. Several players could not play the whole game, including Eddie Gerard and Georges Boucher. Lionel Hitchman played the game with his broken nose in a plaster. Harry Helman played despite a cut to his face from Frank Nighbor's skates, incurred in practice. Cy Denneny had been cut in the leg by the skate of Vancouver's Smokey Harris. 'Super-sub' King Clancy took a turn in all positions, including goal for Clint Benedict in the third period for two minutes when Benedict was serving a penalty. At the time goalies had to serve their own penalties. This is only time that a player played all six positions in a Stanley Cup Final game.

March 29	Ottawa Senators	2–1	OT	Edmonton Eskimos	Denman Arena	Recap
No scoring		First period		No scoring
No scoring		Second period		10:05 - John Morrison (1)
Lionel Hitchman (1) - 13:04		Third period		No scoring
Cy Denneny (3) - 2:08		First overtime period		No scoring
Clint Benedict		Goalie stats		Hal Winkler

March 31	Ottawa Senators	1–0	Edmonton Eskimos	Denman Arena	Recap
Punch Broadbent (6) - pp - 11:23		First period	No scoring
No scoring		Second period	No scoring
No scoring		Third period	No scoring
Clint Benedict		Goalie stats	Hal Winkler

Ottawa won series 2–0

== Stanley Cup engraving ==
The 1923 Stanley Cup was presented by the trophy's trustee William Foran. The Senators never did engrave their name on the Cup for their championship season.

It was not until the trophy was redesigned in 1948 that the words "1923 Ottawa Senators" was put onto its then-new collar.

The following Senators players and staff were members of the Stanley Cup winning team.

1922–23 Ottawa Senators

=== Players ===
Centres

- 9 Frank Nighbor

Wingers

- 6 Jack Darragh
- 7 Harry Punch Broadbent
- 8 Cy Denneny
- 10 Harry Helman

Defencemen

- 2 Frank King Clancy
- 3 Lionel Hitchman
- 4 George Buck Boucher
- 5 Eddie Gerard (Captain)^

Goaltenders

- 1 Clint Benedict

=== Coaching and administrative staff ===
- Edwin Ted Dey (President/Owner)
- Tommy Gorman (Manager/Secretary/Owner)
- Pete Green (Coach)
- Frank Dolan (Trainer)
- Frank Ahearn, (Hon. President/Owner)&

^-Also played Wing &-Missing from team picture

=== Stanley Cup engraving ===
The Senators never did engrave their name on the Cup for their 1923 championship. It was not until the trophy was redesigned in 1948 that the words "1923 Ottawa Senators" was put onto its then-new collar.

== See also ==
- 1922–23 NHL season
- 1922–23 Ottawa Senators season
- 1922–23 PCHA season
- Pacific Coast Hockey Association
- Western Canada Hockey League

Preceded by Toronto St. Pats; 1922	Ottawa Senators; Stanley Cup champions 1923	Succeeded by Montreal Canadiens; 1924
