= 203rd Battalion (Winnipeg Rifles), CEF =

Unit in the Canadian Expeditionary Force during WWI

The 203rd (Winnipeg Rifles) Battalion, CEF was a unit in the Canadian Expeditionary Force during the First World War. Based in Winnipeg, Manitoba, the unit began recruiting during the winter of 1915/16 in that city. After sailing to England in October 1916, the battalion was absorbed into the 18th Reserve Battalion on January 12, 1917. The 203rd (Winnipeg Rifles) Battalion, CEF had one Officer Commanding: Lieut-Col. Jeffrey E. Hansford.

This battalion is perpetuated by the Royal Winnipeg Rifles.
