= Royal Winnipeg Rifles =

Coordinates: 49.8907°N 97.1788°W

- Cap badge of the Royal Winnipeg Rifles
- Active: 1883–present
- Country: Canada
- Branch: Canadian Army
- Type: Rifles
- Part of: 38 Canadian Brigade Group
- Garrison/HQ: Minto Armoury, Winnipeg, Manitoba
- Nickname: Little Black Devils
- Motto: Hosti acie nominati (Latin for 'Named by the enemy')
- March: Quick March: "Old Solomon Levi"; Double Past: "Keel Row"
- Engagements: North-West Rebellion; Second Boer War; First World War; Second World War; War in Afghanistan
- Battle honours: See #Battle honours
- Website: www.theroyalwinnipegrifles.com

Commanders
- Colonel-in-Chief: King Charles III
- Notable commanders: William Nassau Kennedy
- Abbreviation: R Wpg Rif

The Royal Winnipeg Rifles (R Wpg Rif) are a Primary Reserve one-battalion infantry regiment of the Canadian Army. Nicknamed the "Little Black Devils", they are based at Minto Armoury in Winnipeg, Manitoba. The Royal Winnipeg Rifles are part of 3rd Canadian Division's 38 Canadian Brigade Group.

== Lineage ==
=== The Royal Winnipeg Rifles ===
- Originated on 9 November 1883, in Winnipeg, Manitoba, as the 90th Winnipeg Battalion of Rifles
- Redesignated on 8 May 1900, as the 90th Regiment Winnipeg Rifles
- Redesignated on 12 March 1920, as The Winnipeg Rifles
- Redesignated on 3 June 1935, as The Royal Winnipeg Rifles
- Redesignated on 7 November 1940, as the 2nd (Reserve) Battalion, The Royal Winnipeg Rifles
- Redesignated on 28 March 1946, as The Royal Winnipeg Rifles
- Amalgamated on 30 June 1955, with The Winnipeg Light Infantry Retaining its designation.

=== The Winnipeg Light Infantry ===
- Originated on 1 April 1912, in Winnipeg, Manitoba, as the 106th Regiment, Winnipeg Light Infantry.
- Redesignated on 12 March 1920, as The Winnipeg Light Infantry.
- Redesignated on 15 December 1936, as The Winnipeg Light Infantry (Machine Gun).
- Redesignated on 18 March 1942, as the 2nd (Reserve) Battalion, The Winnipeg Light Infantry (Machine Gun).
- Redesignated on 1 June 1945, as The Winnipeg Light Infantry (Machine Gun).
- Redesignated on 1 April 1946, as The Winnipeg Light Infantry.
- Amalgamated on 30 June 1955, with The Royal Winnipeg Rifles.

=== Lineage charts ===
Lineage chart 1878–1914

1878	Winnipeg Infy Coy
1883	90th "Winnipeg" Bn of Rifles
1885	Active service (Note: April–September)	Winnipeg Light Infy Bn (Note: Active service, April–September)
1886	91st "Winnipeg" Bn of Light Infy
1888	Disbanded
1900	90th Regt "Winnipeg Rifles"
1912	106th Regt, Winnipeg Light Infy

Lineage chart 1914–1936

90th Regt "Winnipeg Rifles"	106th Regt, Winnipeg Light Infy
1914	8th Bn, CEF	10th Bn, CEF	44th Bn, CEF	27th Bn, CEF
1915	90th "Overseas" Bn, CEF	144th "Overseas" Bn, CEF	61st "Overseas" Bn, CEF	101st "Overseas" Bn, CEF
1916	Absorbed by 11th Reserve Bn	190th "Overseas" Bn, CEF	203rd "Overseas" Bn, CEF	Absorbed by 11th Reserve Bn, CEF	Absorbed by 17th Reserve Bn, CEF	222nd "Overseas" Bn, CEF	226th "Overseas" Bn, CEF
1917	Absorbed by 18th Reserve Bn	Absorbed by 18th Reserve Bn	Absorbed by 18th Reserve Bn	Absorbed by 19th Reserve Bn	Absorbed by 14th Reserve Bn
1920	Disbanded	Disbanded	Disbanded	Disbanded
1920	1st Bn (8th Bn, CEF), The Winnipeg Rifles	2nd Bn (90th Bn, CEF), (Note: Reserve) The Winnipeg Rifles	3rd Bn (144th Bn, CEF), The Winnipeg Rifles	4th Bn (190th Bn, CEF), The Winnipeg Rifles	5th Bn (203rd Bn, CEF), The Winnipeg Rifles	1st Bn (10th Bn, CEF), The Winnipeg Light Infy	2nd Bn (61st Bn, CEF), The Winnipeg Light Infy	3rd Bn (101st Bn, CEF), The Winnipeg Light Infy	4th Bn (222nd Bn, CEF), The Winnipeg Light Infy	5th Bn (226th Bn, CEF), The Winnipeg Light Infy
1932	Perpetuates 91st Bn	Perpetuates 91st Bn	Perpetuates 91st Bn	Perpetuates 91st Bn	Perpetuates 91st Bn
1935	1st Bn (8th Bn, CEF), The Royal Winnipeg Rifles	2nd Bn (90th Bn, CEF), The Royal Winnipeg Rifles	3rd Bn (144th Bn, CEF), The Royal Winnipeg Rifles	4th Bn (190th Bn, CEF), The Royal Winnipeg Rifles	5th Bn (203rd Bn, CEF), The Royal Winnipeg Rifles
1936	The Royal Winnipeg Rifles	Disbanded	Disbanded	Disbanded	Disbanded	The Winnipeg Light Infy (MG)	Disbanded	Disbanded	Disbanded	Disbanded

Lineage chart 1936–present

The Royal Winnipeg Rifles	The Winnipeg Light Infy (MG)
1940	The Royal Winnipeg Rifles, CASF
1940	1st Bn, The Royal Winnipeg Rifles, CASF	2nd (Reserve) Bn, The Royal Winnipeg Rifles
1942	3rd Bn, The Royal Winnipeg Rifles, CASF	1st Bn, The Winnipeg Light Infy, CASF	2nd (Reserve) Bn, The Winnipeg Light Infy (MG)
1943	Disbanded
1945	4th Bn, The Royal Winnipeg Rifles, CIC, CAOF	Disbanded	The Winnipeg Light Infy (MG)
1946	Disbanded	The Royal Winnipeg Rifles	Disbanded	The Winnipeg Light Infy
1951	"E" Coy, (Note: Regular Force) The Royal Winnipeg Rifles	"F" Coy, The Royal Winnipeg Rifles
1951	Absorbed by 1st Canadian Rifle Bn
1952	Absorbed by 2nd Canadian Rifle Bn
1955	The Royal Winnipeg Rifles
1969	Perpetuates 44th Bn
1999	Perpetuates 27th Bn

== Perpetuations ==
=== North-West Rebellion ===
- 91st "Winnipeg" Battalion of Light Infantry of 1885–1888

=== The Great War ===
- 8th Battalion (90th Winnipeg Rifles), CEF
- 10th Battalion (Canadians), CEF
- 27th Battalion (City of Winnipeg), CEF
- 44th Battalion (Manitoba), CEF
- 61st Battalion (Winnipeg), CEF
- 90th Battalion (Winnipeg Rifles), CEF
- 101st Battalion (Winnipeg Light Infantry), CEF
- 144th Battalion (Winnipeg Rifles), CEF
- 190th Battalion (Winnipeg Rifles), CEF
- 203rd Battalion (Winnipeg Rifles), CEF
- 222nd Battalion, CEF
- 226th Battalion (Men of the North), CEF

== History ==
=== Early history ===
The 90th Winnipeg Battalion of Rifles were formed on 9 November 1883 under the command of Lieutenant Colonel William Nassau Kennedy. Within two years of formation, the 90th battalion served in the 1885 North-West Rebellion, fighting at Fish Creek and Batoche. The regimental Latin motto is hosti acie nominati, which means “named by the enemy in battle”. After the Battle of Fish Creek, a captured Métis asked, "The red coats we know, but who are those little black devils?" – infantry of the line wore red tunics, but the Winnipeg soldiers were clad in rifle green, a shade dark enough to be mistaken for black. From that point on, the 90th Rifles (and later Royal Winnipeg Rifles) became informally nicknamed the "Little Black Devils".

Some former members of the 90th Rifles served in South Africa during the Second Boer War as members of other Canadian units, resulting in the award of the South Africa 1899–1900 battle honour.

=== The First World War ===
The regiment raised several battalions for the Canadian Expeditionary Force in the Great War, the most notable being the 8th Battalion (90th Winnipeg Rifles), CEF, which served in the 2nd Infantry Brigade, 1st Canadian Division. The battalion saw some of the heaviest fighting in World War I, distinguishing itself at battles such as Ypres, the Somme, Vimy, Passchendaele, Amiens, Arras and Cambrai.

Three members of the 8th battalion were awarded Canada's highest honour for gallantry in the face of the enemy, the Victoria Cross.

The distinguishing patch of the 8th Battalion (90th Winnipeg Rifles), CEF.

=== 1920s-1930s ===
In the 1920 reorganization of the Canadian Militia following the report of the Otter Committee, the regiment's former designation as 90th Regiment was dropped and became known as The Winnipeg Rifles. In 1935 the unit was awarded the prefix 'Royal' for its distinguished service to King George V, and the current designation of The Royal Winnipeg Rifles (R Wpg Rif) was adopted.

=== The Second World War ===
In World War II the regiment landed in England in September 1940. As part of the 7th Canadian Infantry Brigade, 3rd Canadian Infantry Division, the Rifles were in the first wave of landings on D Day, 6 June 1944. The Royal Winnipeg Rifles fought throughout the Normandy campaign, fighting in famous battles such as Caen and the Falaise Gap. After helping liberate several of the Channel Ports, the regiment fought to clear the Scheldt Estuary to allow the re-opening of the Antwerp harbour. After helping to liberate the Netherlands, the regiment ended the war preparing to assault the northern German town of Aurich.

Three battalions of the regiment served during the Second World War. The 1st Battalion served in the 3rd Canadian Infantry Division, the 2nd Battalion was a reserve unit that remained on part-time duty in Winnipeg, and a 3rd Battalion served in the Canadian Army Occupation Force.

The 1st Battalion were among the first Allied troops to land on the Normandy beaches on D-Day. They served throughout the Northwest Europe campaign, including the Battle of the Scheldt, the Rhineland, and the final battles across the Rhine, before returning to Canada in 1945. The 3rd Battalion was raised in 1945 and remained in Germany until 1946.

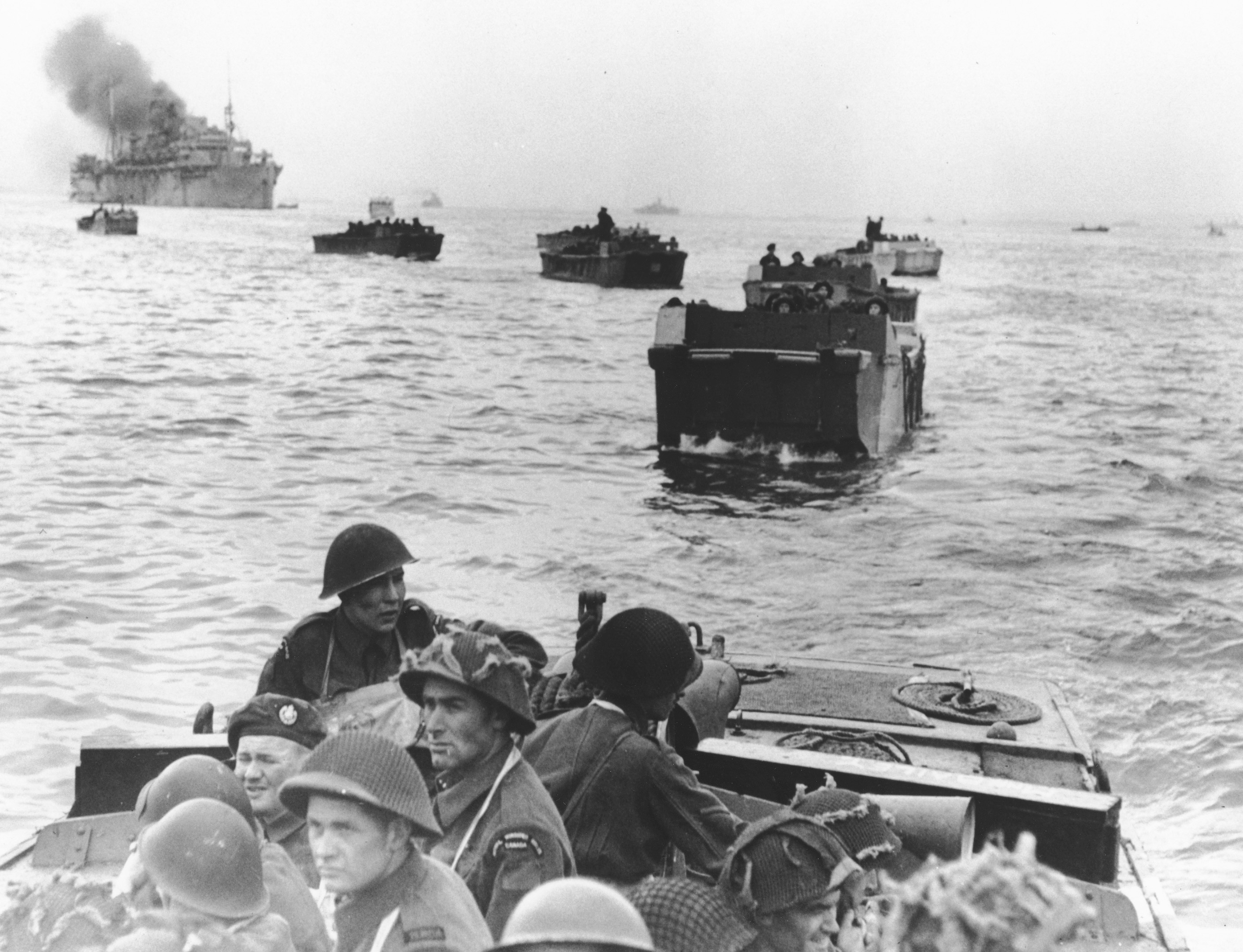
LCA (Landing Craft Assault) containing Winnipeg Rifles head for the Normandy Juno beach - June 6, 1944. Most are wearing Mk III helmets.

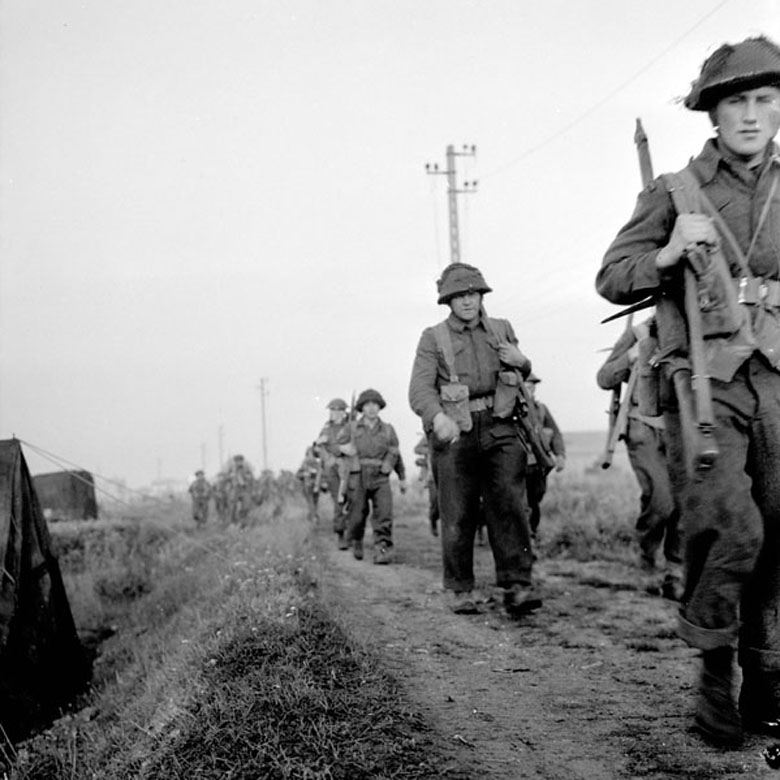
Royal Winnipeg Rifles, during Operation Spring, France, 25 July 1944.

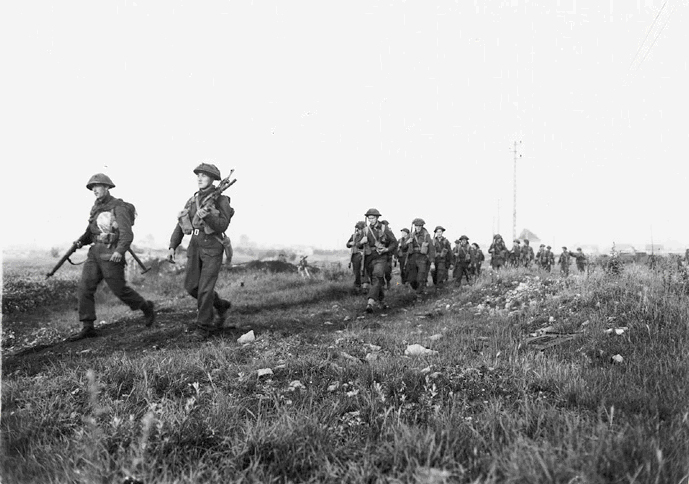
Troops of the Royal Winnipeg Rifles near Ifs, Calvados, France, 25 July 1944.

=== Post-WWII to the Present ===
In 1950 the regiment helped the civil authority during the Winnipeg flood during Operation Red Ramp. During 1951–53, they provided men to the 1st Canadian Rifle Battalion for NATO duty with 27th Canadian Infantry Brigade in Germany. Members of the regiment also served with other units during the Korean War. In 1955, The Winnipeg Light Infantry amalgamated with The Royal Winnipeg Rifles bringing together the histories and traditions of two military units with no change in designation.

On 6 June 1964, a commemorative D-Day monument was erected on the beaches at Courseulles-sur-Mer. In 1978 Prince Charles, The Prince of Wales, became the Colonel-in-Chief of the regiment. Subsequently, a contingent of Rifles attended the wedding of Prince Charles to Lady Diana Spencer on 29 July 1981.

In 1983 The Royal Winnipeg Rifles, celebrated a one hundred years of military service to Canada with numerous events and an official postage stamp.

The regiment contributed numerous soldiers to overseas deployments in the Balkans and to Canadian operations in Afghanistan.

In 2009, the Royal Winnipeg Rifles and the Queen's Own Cameron Highlanders (both stationed at Minto Armoury) merged into the Winnipeg Infantry Tactical Group (Wpg Inf Tac Grp, or WITG). Both infantry regiments retained a large majority of their traditions but had a mixed and fully cooperative chain of command with only one commanding officer (CO) for both units. In 2018, the units were disaggregated, now with two separate chains of command and with different roles. The new main role for the Royal Winnipeg Rifles is maintaining the Arctic Response Company Group.

== Structure ==
- Leadership and appointments
  - Colonel-in-Chief: Charles III
  - Honorary Colonel: Abdo El Tassi
  - Honorary Lieutenant-Colonel: Gail Asper
  - Commanding Officer: Lieutenant-Colonel Michael Lane
  - Regimental Sergeant Major: Chief Warrant Officer John Dawson
  - Band Sergeant Major: Warrant Officer Karen Johnson
- Battalion structure
  - Alpha Company
  - Regimental Band
  - Ceremonial Detachment (The Skirmishers and The Pioneers)
  - Sub-Units

=== The Royal Winnipeg Rifles Band ===
The Regimental Band is as old as the Regiment, dating back to 1883, making it the oldest concert band in Winnipeg. In 1885, members of the band accompanied the Regiment to the Northwest Rebellion. At first consisting only of buglers and drummers, the band has developed into a professional brass and reed concert band, capable of supporting vocals and a multitude of styles and genres in its repertoire, while maintaining its traditions with a bugle line. Bugles, by tradition and practical use, are closely associated with Rifle Regiments; in garrison and on the battlefield, orders were relayed by buglers. Today the Band continues to entertain the people of Manitoba and assist in the esprit de corps of the Regiment. Bands of the perpetuated regiments date back to when the 106th Winnipeg Light Infantry Band was organized. During the First World War, bandmaster Thomas William James took the band to England where it would merge with the 10th Battalion Band to become the first Canadian band to serve on French soil.

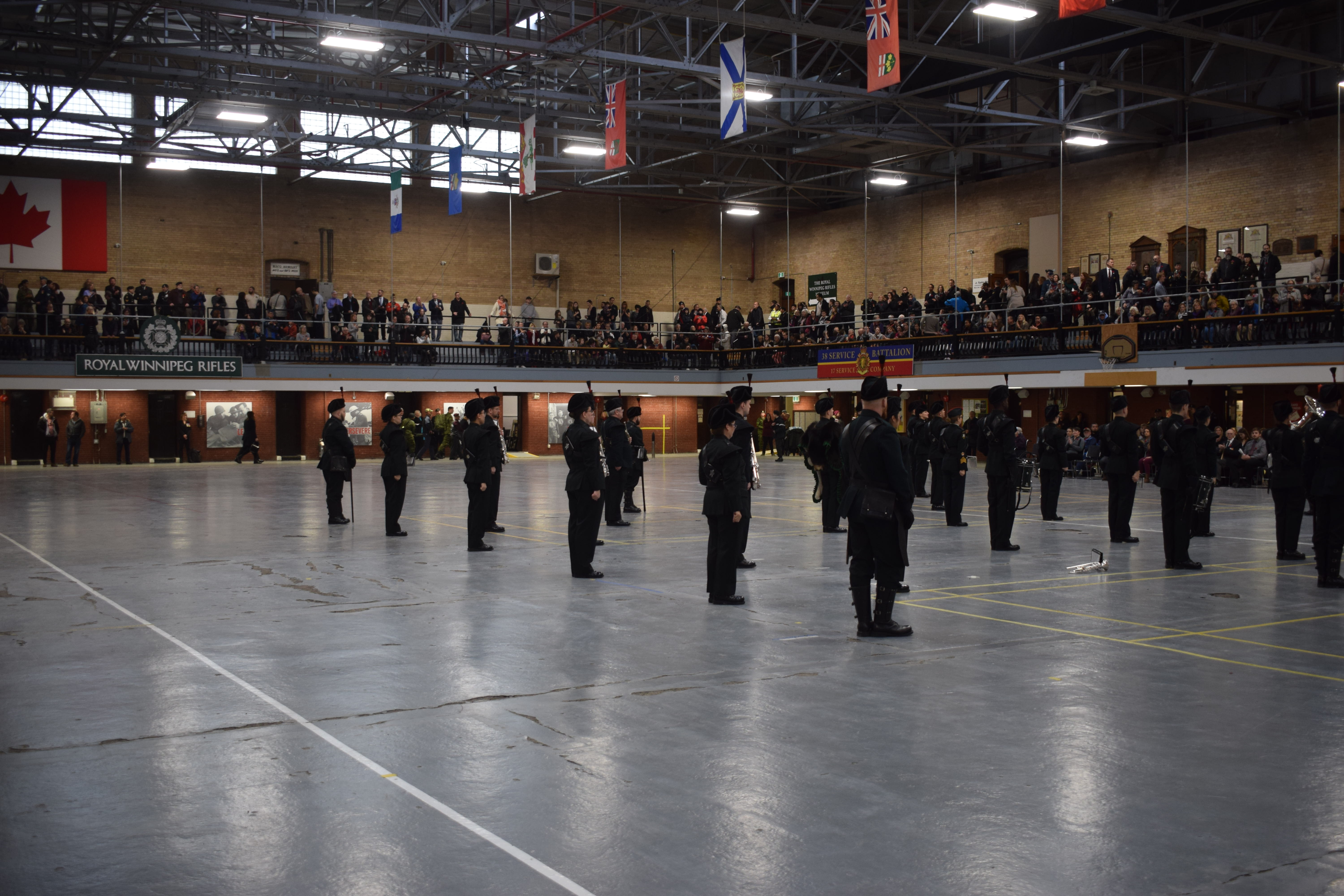
The Royal Winnipeg Rifles Band during a Remembrance Day ceremony at Minto Armoury, 11 November 2018.

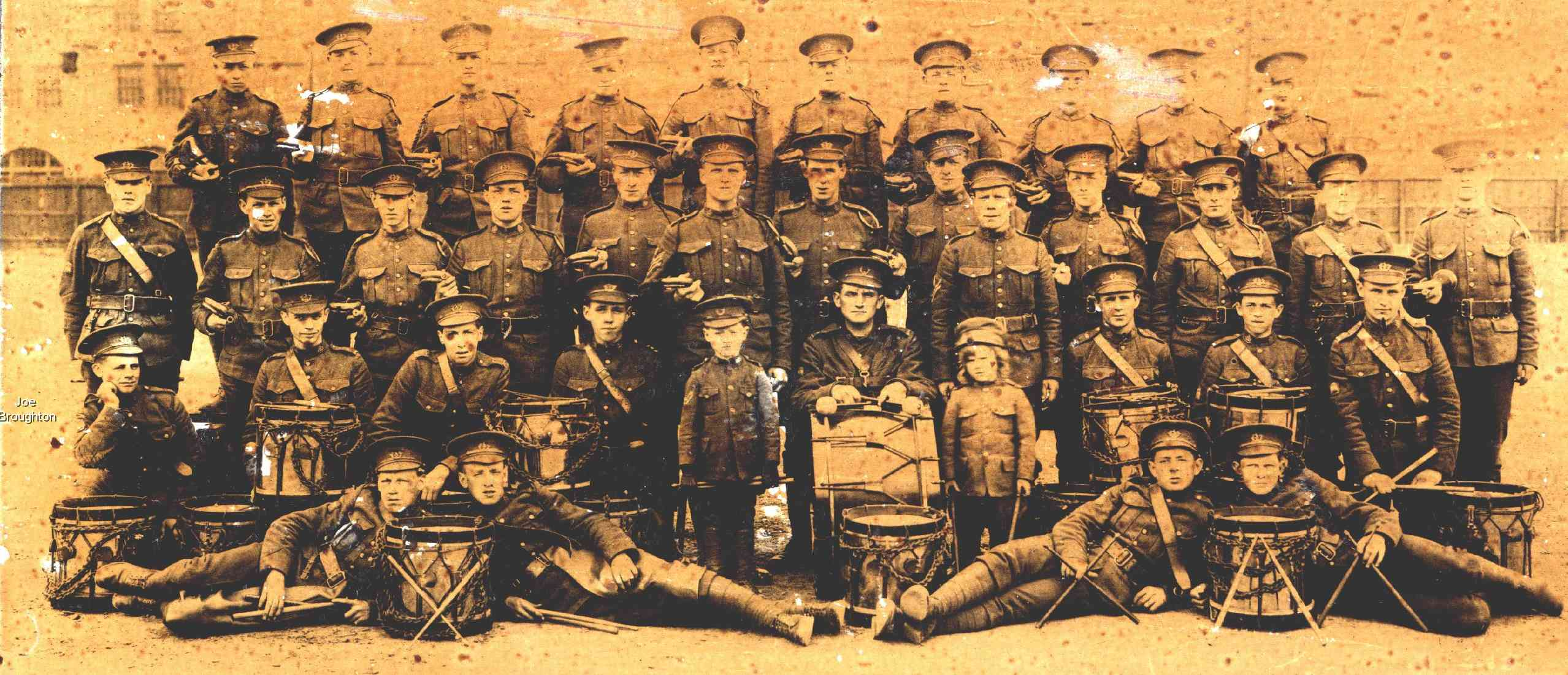
Bugle Band of 144th Battalion, CEF

== Traditions ==
The Royal Winnipeg Rifles follow the traditions of rifle regiments throughout the Commonwealth. Thus they do not have a stand of regimental colours, and they march at the traditional rate of 140 paces a minute instead of the CF standard 120. Rifles are usually carried "at the trail". Battle honours are borne on the cap badge and drums. The regimental badge depicts a devil carrying a trident and in imitation of a rifleman's role on the battlefield, he is depicted as running. As is also traditional in rifle regiments for reasons of concealment, buttons and badges are "blackened" or darkened and are not polished.

The rank designation of a trained private (one chevron) of the Royal Winnipeg Rifles is "Rifleman."

The regimental band's drums are emblazoned with the unit's battle honours. The regimental pioneers form the escort to the colours when on parade. The pioneers wear leather aprons and carry special tools and weapons: axes or hatchets, picks, and halberds. Along with the pioneers there are also skirmishers who wear the traditional uniform of a 90th Battalion rifleman circa 1885. The skirmishers often appear in ceremonies and memorials such as Remembrance Day and events.

The regimental march of the Royal Winnipeg Rifles is "Pork, Beans and Hard Tack (Old Solomon Levi)" and the double quick march is "The Keel Row."

== Alliances ==
- United Kingdom — The Rifles

== Battle honours ==
In the list below, battle honours in small capitals were awarded for participation in large operations and campaigns, while those in lowercase indicate honours granted for more specific battles. The battle honours in bold type are emblazoned on the cap badge.

North West Rebellion
- **Fish Creek**
- **Batoche**
- **North West Canada, 1885**
South African War
- **South Africa, 1899–1900**
First World War
- **Ypres**
  - **1915**
  - **1917**
- Gravenstafel
- St. Julien
- **Festubert, 1915**
- **Mount Sorrel**
- **Somme**
  - **1916**
  - **1918**
- Flers–Courcelette
- Thiepval
- Ancre Heights
- Ancre, 1916
- Arras
  - 1917
  - 1918
- **Vimy, 1917**
- Arleux
- **Hill 70**
- **Passchendaele**
- **Amiens**
- Scarpe
  - 1917
  - 1918
- **Drocourt–Quéant**
- Hindenburg Line
- **Canal du Nord**
- Cambrai, 1918
- Valenciennes
- France and Flanders, 1915–18

Honorary distinction: oak leaf shoulder badge for the actions of the 10th Battalion, CEF, at Kitcheners' Wood on 22/23 April 1915. Inherited from the Winnipeg Light Infantry, the badge has not been worn since the amalgamation.

Second World War
- **Normandy Landing**
- **Putot-en-Bessin**
- Caen
- **Carpiquet**
- The Orne
- Bourguébus Ridge
- **Falaise**
- The Laison
- The Seine, 1944
- **Calais, 1944**
- **The Scheldt**
- **Leopold Canal**
- Breskens Pocket
- The Rhineland
- Waal Flats
- **Moyland Wood**
- **The Rhine**
- Emmerich–Hoch Elten
- Deventer
- **North-West Europe, 1944–1945**
War in Afghanistan
- Afghanistan

== Recognition ==
On 10 November 1983 Canada Post issued 'The Royal Winnipeg Rifles, The Royal Canadian Dragoons as part of the Canadian Forces, Regiments, 1883–1983 series. The stamps were designed by Ralph Tibbles, based on a painting by William Southern. The 32¢ stamps are perforated 13.5 x 13 and were printed by Canadian Bank Note Company, Limited.

== Royal Canadian Army Cadets ==
The RWR has an army cadet corps of the same name, Royal Winnipeg Rifles Cadet Corps, formed in 1947. The cadet corps is based at Minto Armoury in Winnipeg.

== Notable members ==
- Lieutenant Colonel William Nassau Kennedy
- Lieutenant Hugh John Macdonald
- Major Frank Fane
- Captain Frank Mackenzie Ross
- Lieutenant Colonel Jeff Nicklin
- Major Clifford Chadderton
- Pilot Officer Art Grant
- Warrant Officer Robert Falcon Ouellette
- Lieutenant Gordon A. Smith
- Acting Commissioner Zachary Taylor Wood

== Victoria Cross holders ==
- Alexander Picton Brereton
- Frederick George Coppins
- Frederick William Hall
- Andrew Mynarski

== The Royal Winnipeg Rifles Museum and Archives ==
The Royal Winnipeg Rifles Museum and Archives
- Location: Minto Armoury, 969 St. Matthews Avenue, Winnipeg, Manitoba, Canada
- Type: Military Museum

The museum preserves the history of The Royal Winnipeg Rifles through the collection, conservation and display of artefacts and archives commencing with the Red River Expedition of 1870 to the present. It provides a source of training in the regiment's history for all members of the regiment and the public, fostering an interest, knowledge and sense of pride in the regiment's activities and accomplishments. It also maintains a current record of all regimental memorials and monuments in Canada and elsewhere. The Museum is affiliated with: CMA, CHIN and Virtual Museum of Canada.

== Media ==
- Named by the Enemy: A History of the Royal Winnipeg Rifles by Brian A. Reid (Jan 31 2010)
- Little Black Devils: A History of the Royal Winnipeg Rifles by Bruce; Wells, Eric Tascona (1983)

== See also ==
- The Canadian Crown and the Canadian Forces
- 38 Canadian Brigade Group Website (ref: Royal Winnipeg Rifles)

== Order of precedence ==
Preceded by The Cameron Highlanders of Ottawa (Duke of Edinburgh's Own)	The Royal Winnipeg Rifles	Succeeded by The Essex and Kent Scottish
