= Savournon =

- Commune
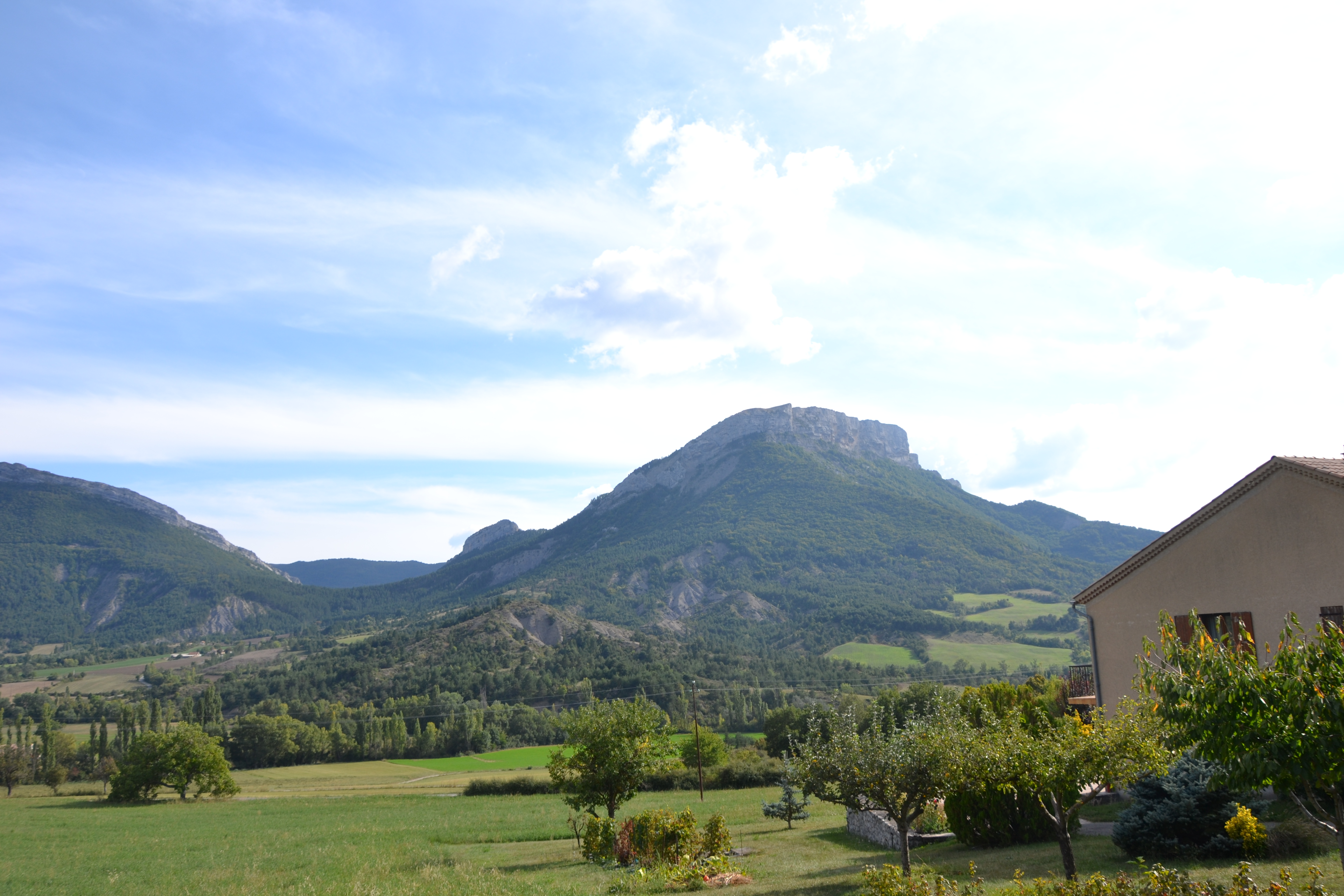

- Coat of arms
- Location of Savournon
- Location within France Location within Provence-Alpes-Côte d'Azur
- Coordinates: 44°25′23″N 5°47′30″E
- Country: France
- Region: Provence-Alpes-Côte d'Azur
- Department: Hautes-Alpes
- Arrondissement: Gap
- Canton: Serres

Government
  - Mayor (2026–32): Laurent Scherrer
- Area^{1}: 39.23 km^{2} (15.15 sq mi)
- Elevation: 700 m (2,300 ft)
- Highest elevation: 1,760 m (5,770 ft)
- Lowest elevation: 671 m (2,201 ft)
- Population (2023): 242
  - Density: 6.17/km^{2} (16.0/sq mi)
- Time zone: UTC+01:00 (CET)
  - Summer (DST): UTC+02:00 (CEST)
- INSEE/Postal code: 05165 /05700
- ^{1} French Land Register data, which excludes lakes, ponds, glaciers > 1 km^{2} (0.386 sq mi or 247 acres) and river estuaries.

Savournon (French pronunciation: [savuʁnɔ̃]; Occitan: Savornon) is a commune in the Hautes-Alpes department in southeastern France.

== Population ==
Historical population
Year	Pop.	±% p.a.
1968	182	—
1975	174	−0.64%
1982	146	−2.48%
1990	191	+3.42%
1999	208	+0.95%
2007	253	+2.48%
2012	235	−1.47%
2017	259	+1.96%
2023	242	−1.13%
Source: INSEE

== See also ==
- Communes of the Hautes-Alpes department
