= Art Grant (ice hockey) =

Canadian ice hockey player

- Born: January 20, 1919 Montreal, Quebec, Canada
- Died: June 12, 1943 (aged 24) near Rheinberg, Nazi Germany
- Height: 5 ft 10 in (178 cm)
- Weight: 174 lb (79 kg; 12 st 6 lb)
- Position: Goaltender
- Shot: Left
- Played for: Winnipeg Falcon-Rangers; Winnipeg Monarchs; Ayr Raiders; Fife Flyers
- Playing career: 1937–1940

Arthur Gordon Grant (January 20, 1919 – June 12, 1943) was a Canadian professional ice hockey player who played as a goaltender in the Scottish National League for the Ayr Raiders. He also appeared non-professionally for the Winnipeg Monarchs.

== Early life and hockey career ==
Grant was born on January 20, 1919, in Montreal to Keith Gordon and Marjory Grant. He joined the Winnipeg Falcon-Rangers of the Manitoba Junior Hockey League in 1937, and played one season there before transferring to the Winnipeg Monarchs. Emigrating to Scotland in 1939, he played for the Ayr Raiders and Fife Flyers before joining the armed forces. He married in September 1942.

== Military career and death ==
Grant served in the Royal Winnipeg Rifles for 6 months as a private. In civilian life, he worked as a clockkeeper during his time in Scotland. Moving back to Canada in July 1940, Grant enlisted in the Royal Canadian Air Force in Winnipeg on February 26, 1941, and was assigned to pilot training, completing the course in January 1943 and being transferred to England thereafter.

On June 12, 1943, Pilot Officer Grant took off from RAF Leeming in Handley Page Halifax JB972 to conduct a raid on Düsseldorf. Southwest of Rheinberg, Nazi Germany, the aircraft was shot down, killing 3 of the crew members aboard, including Grant. The remaining 4 crew members became prisoners of war, and Grant and the other 2 crew members killed were listed as presumed dead in October 1943. The 3 dead crew had been buried at Monchengladbach after the crash, but were disinterred in 1949 and reburied at Rheinberg War Cemetery.

== Career statistics ==
			Regular season					Goal statistics				Playoffs					Goal statistics
Season	Team	League	GP	W	L	T	SO	Min	GA	GAA	PIM	GP	W	L	T	SO	Min	GA	GAA	PIM
1937–38	Winnipeg Falcon-Rangers	MJHL	21	12	6	3	1	1260	57	2.71	0	2	2	0	2	0	120	11	5.50	0
1938–39	Winnipeg Monarchs	MJHL	21	13	5	3	2	1260	74	3.37	0	7	4	3	0	0	430	24	3.43	0
1939–40	Ayr Raiders	SNL	2	–	–	–	–	–	5	2.50	0	–	–	–	–	–	–	–	–	–
1939-40	Fife Flyers	SNL	–	–	–	–	–	–	–	–	–	–	–	–	–	–	–	–	–	–
Career totals			44	25	11	6	3	2520	136	–	–	9	4	5	0	0	550	35	–	–
