= Pierre de Rastel de Rocheblave =

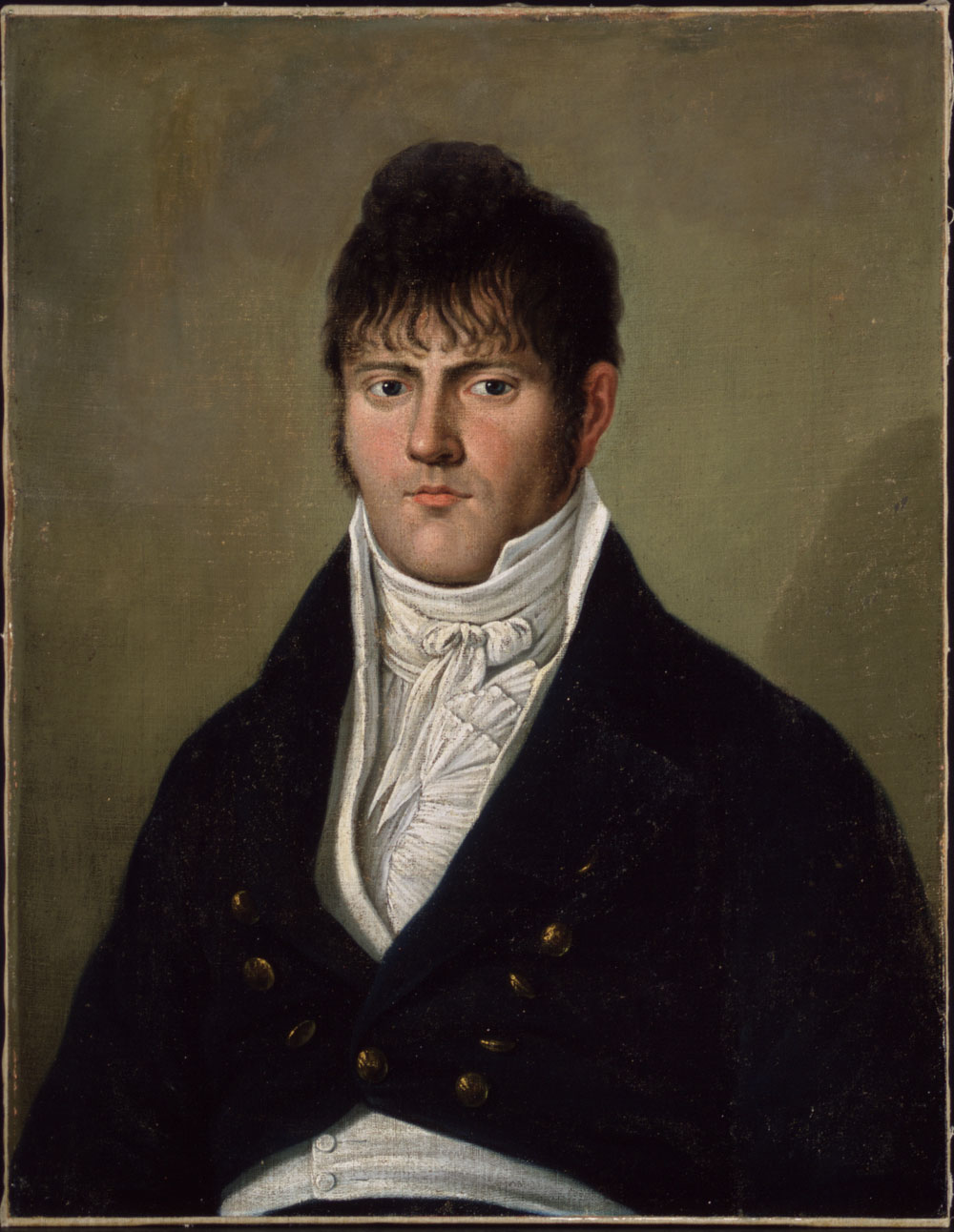
Pierre de Rastel de Rocheblave

Pierre de Rastel de Rocheblave (March 9, 1773 – October 5, 1840) was a fur trader, businessman and political figure in Lower Canada.

He was born in what is now Kaskaskia, Illinois in 1773, the son of Philippe-François de Rastel de Rocheblave, and moved to Montreal with his family after the American Revolution. Like his father, he entered the fur trade and he worked for his father at Detroit. He helped found the XY Company in 1798 and looked after the Athabasca department as a wintering partner. He was put in charge of the Red River department after the company merged with the North West Company in 1804; he was later put in charge of the Athabasca and then Pic departments. In 1811, he was named manager for the new South West Fur Company. During the War of 1812, he was named captain of the Corps of Canadian Voyageurs and served as major in the militia after the war. He was involved in coordinating the transfer of assets when the North West Company merged with the Hudson's Bay Company in the 1820s and served as agent for the HBC until he retired from the fur trade in 1827.

Rocheblave purchased land at Coteau-Saint-Louis on the island of Montreal and elsewhere in the province. He helped develop the Champlain and St Lawrence Railroad. He was named a justice of the peace for Montreal District in 1821 and also served on various commissions. In 1827, he was elected to the Legislative Assembly of Lower Canada for Montreal West. He was named to the Legislative Council in 1832 and was named to the Special Council that administered the province after the Lower Canada Rebellion. He opposed the union of Upper and Lower Canada and was president of an organization that opposed any such plan.

He died at Coteau-Saint-Louis in 1840. His widow Elmire, died in 1886. Both were buried in the Church of Notre Dame, Montreal.

== Family ==
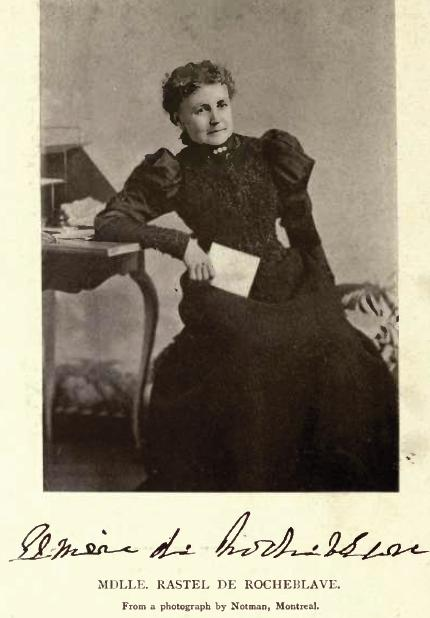
Mademoiselle Elmira Rastel de Rocheblave by William Notman

Hon. Pierre Rastel de Rocheblave, of Montreal, and his wife, Elmire, daughter of Jean Bouthillier had two daughters. One daughter married Capt. W. L. Willoughby, of the Royal Welsh Fusiliers, and died in 1846. Another daughter, Mademoiselle Elmire de Rocheblave danced at the Citizens' Ball in Montreal with the Prince of Wales (later King Edward VII) when His Majesty visited Canada in 1860. The family resided at 2073 St. Catherine Street, Montreal, Quebec.
