= 222nd Battalion, CEF =

The 222nd Battalion, CEF was a unit in the Canadian Expeditionary Force during the First World War. Based in Winnipeg, Manitoba, the unit began recruiting in early 1916 throughout the province. After sailing to England in November 1916 onboard the RMS Olympic, the battalion was absorbed into the 19th Reserve Battalion on January 2, 1917. The 222nd Battalion, CEF had one Officer Commanding: Lieut-Col. James Lightfoot.

Notable member of the 222nd Infantry was Amos William Mayse, a veteran of both the Boer War and World War I He was severely injured in both wars. He returned to Manitoba following the Boer war. He became a pastor, and preached in Neepawa and Peguis before war broke out in 1914. He enlisted into the 222nd, where he quickly rose up the ranks to Lieutenant. Following the war, he returned to Canada, retiring in British Columbia, where he stayed until his death in 1948.

This battalion is perpetuated by the Royal Winnipeg Rifles.
