= Clockkeeper =

Medieval occupation

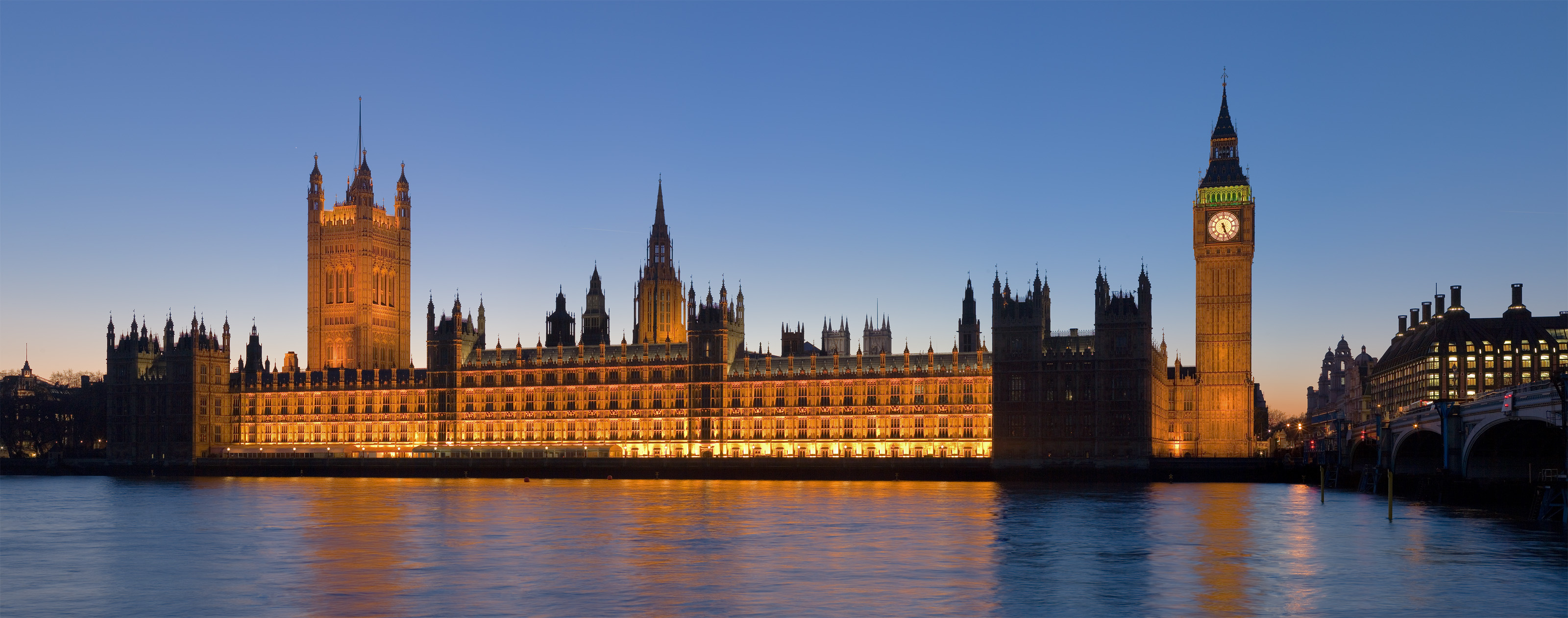
The Palace of Westminster. A clockkeeper was, during the 13th century, employed here.

A clockkeeper, sometimes seen as clock keeper, refers to a form of employment seen prevalently during Middle Age Europe involving the tracking of time and the maintaining of clocks and other timekeeping devices. However, the practice and its appearance throughout history fluctuated in centuries following the Middle Ages, and the necessity of an attendant to clockkeep remained long after the invention of the mechanical clock.

The clockkeeper was often paid considerable amounts of money to ensure the accuracy of a given clock or clocks, as the practice involved at least basic skills in mathematics and numbers in a time when education had not yet made a widespread appearance. Clockkeepers were also expected to keep the clocks in good working order, and that they did not malfunction. The prominence of the position throughout the period varies, and the contexts in which it was applied also varies; often, the lord of a settlement or manor would employ a clockkeeper, and, just as often, an entire town may have had a designated person to regulate the town clock. They were also seen in use in cathedrals and monasteries. Time keeping in the latter case was important considering the various schedules of the Church, the complexity of its day, and the various daily, weekly, monthly and annual rituals it took part in. Recorded instances of such holy places requiring a clockkeeper during the late 13th and early 14th centuries included, among others:

- St Paul's Cathedral
- Palace of Westminster
- Cambrai Cathedral

The dimensions of clockkeeping were also interchangeable. During the period, most clocks needed rewinding at least twice a day, but, depending on the specifics of the employment, this may have differed. Other details included whether the clockkeeper was permanent, or periodic—some clockkeepers were merely employed to check and ensure the good order of the clock, rather than to constantly monitor the time.

In modern times, a clockkeeper is the official in charge of clocking playing time in certain sporting events.
