= 101st Battalion (Winnipeg Light Infantry), CEF =

- Active: 22 December 1915 - 12 October 1917
- Country: Canada
- Branch: Canadian Army
- Type: Light Infantry
- Size: Battalion
- Garrison/HQ: Winnipeg, Manitoba
- Engagements: World War I

Commanders
- Notable commanders: Lt.-Col. D. McLean

The 101st Battalion (Winnipeg Light Infantry), CEF, was an infantry battalion of the Great War Canadian Expeditionary Force. The 101st Battalion was authorized on 22 December 1915 and embarked for Great Britain on 29 June 1916, where, on 13 July 1916, its personnel were absorbed by the 17th Reserve Battalion, CEF, to provide reinforcements to the Canadian Corps in the field. The battalion disbanded on 12 October 1917. It was recruited in, and was mobilized at, Winnipeg, Manitoba.

It was commanded by Lt.-Col. D. McLean from 28 June 1916 to 21 August 1916. It was awarded the battle honour THE GREAT WAR 1916. It (Winnipeg Light Infantry), CEF, is perpetuated by the Royal Winnipeg Rifles.

== Sources ==
- Nicholson, G. W. L. (1962). Canadian Expeditionary Force 1914–1919. Ottawa, CA: Queen's Printer.
