= 61st Battalion (Winnipeg), CEF =

Canadian infantry battalion

The 61st Battalion (Winnipeg), CEF was an infantry battalion of the Canadian Expeditionary Force during the Great War. The 61st Battalion was authorized on 20 April 1915 and embarked for Great Britain on 5 April 1915. It provided reinforcements to the Canadian Corps in the field until 6 July 1916, when its personnel were absorbed by the 11th Reserve Battalion, CEF. The battalion was subsequently disbanded on 17 July 1917.

The 61st Battalion recruited in and was mobilized at Winnipeg, Manitoba.

The 61st Battalion was commanded by Lt.-Col. F.J. Murray from 1 April 1916 to 6 July 1916.

The 61st Battalion was awarded the battle honour THE GREAT WAR 1916.

The 61st Battalion, CEF is perpetuated by The Royal Winnipeg Rifles.

== Sources ==
Canadian Expeditionary Force 1914-1919 by Col. G.W.L. Nicholson, CD, Queen's Printer, Ottawa, Ontario, 1962
