= Art Grant (baseball) =

American baseball player

- Catcher

Negro league baseball debut
- 1922, for the Richmond Giants

Last appearance
- 1922, for the Richmond Giants

Teams
- Richmond Giants (1922)

Arthur Grant was an American Negro league catcher in the 1920s.

Grant played for the Richmond Giants in 1922. In seven recorded games, he posted three hits in 26 plate appearances.
