= 1916 Allan Cup =

Canadian senior ice hockey championship

The Allan Cup trophy

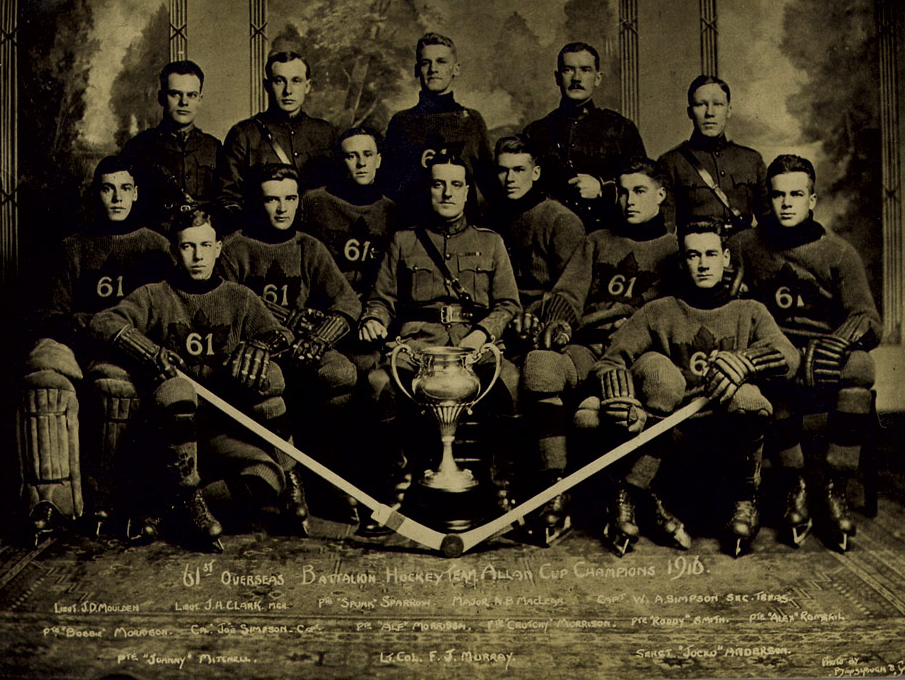
Winnipeg 61st Battalion with the Allan Cup in 1916.

The 1916 Allan Cup was the Canadian senior ice hockey championship for the 1915–16 season. The final challenge was hosted by the Winnipeg 61st Battalion and Winnipeg, Manitoba. The 1916 playoff marked the 9th time the Allan Cup had a champion.

== First challenge ==
The defending 1915 Allan Cup champion Winnipeg Monarchs faced the Winnipeg 61st Battalion in the Winnipeg Patriotic League A Division final.

=== Results ===
Winnipeg 61st Battalion 5 - Winnipeg Monarchs 3
Winnipeg Monarchs 7 - Winnipeg 61st Battalion 6

The Winnipeg Monarchs protested that the Allan Cup should not be awarded to the Winnipeg 61st Battalion, since they considered games in the Patriotic Hockey League to be exhibitions rather than championship play. Claude C. Robinson was vice-president of the league and an Allan Cup trustee, who denied the protest. The Manitoba Amateur Hockey Association upheld a motion by Robinson that the 61st Battalion get to defend the Allan Cup by virtue of winning the Patriotic League, but that the Monarchs would be given the opportunity to defend the cup only if the soldiers had to leave Winnipeg.

== Second challenge ==
The Winnipeg 61st Battalion received a challenge from the Winnipeg Victorias, Winnipeg Patriotic League B Division champions. The series took place in Winnipeg, Manitoba.

=== Results ===
Winnipeg 61st Battalion 5 - Winnipeg Victorias 3

Winnipeg 61st Battalion win the series and carry the Allan Cup.

== Third challenge ==
The Winnipeg 61st Battalion received a challenge from a team in Fort William, Ontario, senior champions of the Thunder Bay Amateur Hockey Association. The series was played in Winnipeg, Manitoba.

=== Results ===
Winnipeg 61st Battalion 4 - Fort William 1
Fort William 5 - Winnipeg 61st Battalion 4

Winnipeg 61st Battalion win the series 8-6 and carry the Allan Cup.

== Fourth challenge ==
Allan Cup trustee Claude C. Robinson ruled that the Ontario Hockey Association was too late in sending its champion to Winnipeg, and omitted them from the playoffs. He then scheduled the final challenge between Regina and the 61st Battalion.

Winnipeg 61st Battalion received a challenge from the Regina Victorias, senior champions of the Saskatchewan Amateur Hockey Association. The series was played in Winnipeg, Manitoba.

=== Results ===
Winnipeg 61st Battalion 5 - Regina Victorias 1
Winnipeg 61st Battalion 8 - Regina Victorias 2

Winnipeg 61st Battalion carry the Allan Cup, winning the series 13-goals-to-3. With no more challengers accepted in time to play, the 61st Battalion win the 1916 Allan Cup.
