= Boyd (surname) =

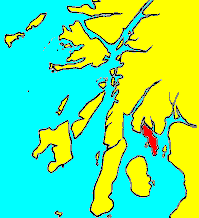
- Location of the Isle of Bute

Origin
- Region of origin: Scotland

Other names
- Variant forms: Boid; Bhoid

Boyd is an ancient Scottish surname.

The name is attached to Simon, one of several brothers and children of Alan, son of Flathald. Simon's son Robert was called Boyt or Boyd from the Celtic term boidhe, meaning fair or yellow. Robert the Bruce granted lands to Sir Robert Boyd as the ancestor of the earls of Kilmarnock. The Scottish peerage of the earls of Kilmarnock ends shortly after William Boyd rebelled in the Battle of Culloden in 1746. William was arrested and executed at the Tower of London in 1746. He left a widow and three sons including James, Lord Boyd who married and succeeded his father as the Earl of Errol, taking his mother's title.

Another theory is of territorial origins which may have been taken from the Bhoid, the Gaelic term for the island of Bute, in the Firth of Clyde. The surname was common in Edinburgh in the 17th century. The Scottish Gaelic form of the surname is Boid (masculine), and Bhoid (feminine).

== A ==
- Adam Boyd (born 1982), English footballer
- Adele Boyd (1932–2018), American field hockey player
- Alan Lennox-Boyd, 1st Viscount Boyd of Merton, British politician
- Alan Stephenson Boyd, American politician
- Alex Boyd (photographer), Scottish photographer
- Alexander Boyd, 3rd Lord Boyd (died after 1508), Scottish noble
- Alix Boyd-Knights (1944–2023), Dominican politician
- Alfred Boyd, Canadian politician
- Alice Boyd, Scottish artist
- Allen Boyd, American politician
- Andrew Kennedy Hutchison Boyd (1825–1899), Scottish writer
- Anne Boyd, Australian composer
- Archibald Boyd, English cleric
- Archibald Boyd-Carpenter, British politician
- Archie Boyd (footballer), Scottish footballer
- Arnold Boyd, British ornithologist
- Arthur Boyd (Arthur Merric Bloomfield Boyd), Australian painter
- Arthur Merric Boyd, Australian painter
- Augusto Samuel Boyd, President of Panama

== B ==
- Belle Boyd, Confederate spy in the American Civil War
- Benjamin Boyd, Australian pioneer
- Bill Boyd (disambiguation)
- Billy Boyd (actor), Scottish actor
- Blanche McCrary Boyd, American novelist
- Bob Boyd (disambiguation)
- Brady Boyd (born 1967), American pastor
- Brady Boyd (American football) (born 2002), American football player
- Brandon Boyd, American musician, singer with Incubus
- Brett Boyd, Australian rugby player
- Brian Boyd, New Zealand English professor
- Brittany Boyd, American basketball player

== C ==
- Carla Boyd, Australian basketball player
- Cayden Boyd, American actor
- Cecil Boyd, Irish international rugby player
- Chris Boyd (rugby union) (born 1958), New Zealand rugby coach
- Christopher Boyd (IT security), computer security expert
- Christopher Boyd (politician) (1916–2004), British politician
- Colin Boyd, Baron Boyd of Duncansby, Scottish lawyer
- Curtis Boyd, American jazz drummer

== D ==
- Danah Boyd, American blogger
- Daniel Boyd (disambiguation)
- Darius Boyd, Australian rugby league player
- Darren Boyd, British actor
- David Boyd (disambiguation)
- Delisha Boyd, American politician from Louisiana
- Devin Boyd, American basketball player
- Diane K. Boyd, American wildlife biologist
- Douglas Boyd, British oboist and conductor
- Dustin Boyd, Canadian ice hockey player
- Dutch Boyd, American poker player
- Dwight Boyd, American basketball player

== E ==
- Edwin Alonzo Boyd, Canadian bank robber
- Edith B. Boyd, one of the Del Rubio triplets
- Elena Boyd, one of the Del Rubio triplets
- Eliza Stewart Boyd, first woman on a jury in America
- Elizabeth Boyd, English writer and poet
- Eric DeWayne Boyd, American murderer
- Eric L. Boyd, American software engineer
- Esna Boyd, Australian tennis player
- Eva Boyd, American singer Little Eva

== F ==
- Federico Boyd, President of Panama
- Frances Boyd Calhoun (1867–1909) American author
- Frank L. Boyd (1881–1962), American labor organizer
- Francine "Fran" Boyd, a fictional drug addict featured in The Corner; the sister of Bunchie, Sharry, and Stevie Boyd

== G ==
- George Boyd (disambiguation)
- Gordon Boyd (1922–2009) (real name: Gordon Needham), British-Australian entertainer
- Greg Boyd (disambiguation)
- Guy Boyd (sculptor), Australian sculptor

== H ==
- Harriet Boyd-Hawes, American archaeologist

== J ==
- James Boyd (disambiguation)
- James Boyd, 2nd Lord Boyd (c. 1469–1484), Scottish noble
- James Boyd, 9th Lord Boyd (died 1654), Scottish noble
- Jason Boyd, American record producer and songwriter known professionally as Poo Bear
- Jane Boyd, British artist
- Jeanne Boyd (1890–1968), American composer
- Jenna Boyd, American actress
- Jenny Boyd, British model, sister of Pattie Boyd
- Jerry Boyd (1930–2002), American boxing trainer writing as F.X. Toole
- Jim Boyd (disambiguation)
- Joe Boyd, American record producer
- John Boyd (disambiguation)
- John Boyd Orr, 1st Baron Boyd-Orr, Scottish nutritionist and Nobel Peace Prize winner
- John Boyd-Carpenter, Baron Boyd-Carpenter, British politician
- Johnny Boyd, American racing driver
- Jonathan Boyd (1944–1999), Australian wrestler
- Joseph Boyd (disambiguation)
- Julian Boyd, American basketball player
- Justin Boyd (disambiguation)
- Jason Boyd, British actor in Harry Potter and the Order of the Phoenix
- James Boyd, later James Hay, 15th Earl of Erroll (1726–1778), Scottish noble

== K ==
- Khristian Boyd (born 2000), American football player
- Kris Boyd (born 1983), Scottish footballer
- Kris Boyd (American football) (born 1996), American football player

== L ==
- L. M. Boyd (1927–2007), American columnist
- LaVell Boyd (born 1976), American football player
- Leon Boyd (born 1983), Dutch baseball player
- Leon Boyd (born 2005), Irish footballer
- Les Boyd (born 1956), Australian rugby league player
- Linn Boyd (1800–1859), American politician
- Liona Boyd (born 1949), Canadian musician
- Louise Arner Boyd (1887–1972), American explorer
- Lucious Boyd (born 1959), American murderer

== M ==
- Mackenzie Boyd, fictional character from the British soap opera Emmerdale
- Malcolm Boyd (1923–2015), American Episcopal priest and author
- Margaret Boyd (1913–1993), English lacrosse player and schoolteacher
- Margot Boyd (1913–2008), British actor
- Mark Alexander Boyd (1563–1601), Scottish poet
- Mark Frederick Boyd (1889–1968), American malariologist and writer
- Marion Boyd (1946–2022), Canadian politician
- Martin Boyd (1893–1972), Australian architect and writer
- Mary D. R. Boyd (1809–?), American children's author
- Matthew Boyd (baseball), (born 1991), American baseball player
- Merle Kodo Boyd (1944–2022), American Zen Buddhist nun
- Merric Boyd (1888–1959) Australian artist
- Michele Boyd, American actress
- Mike Boyd (disambiguation)
- Milly Boyd, one of the Del Rubio triplets

== N ==
- Nancy Boyd, pseudonym of American poet Edna St. Vincent Millay
- Neal E. Boyd (1975–2018), American opera singer and 2008 America's Got Talent winner
- Neva Boyd, American educator
- Norma Elizabeth Boyd, American sorority organiser

== O ==
- Oil Can Boyd (born 1959), American baseball player

== P ==
- Pattie Boyd, British model and photographer
- Peggy Boyd, one of Scotland's first air ambulance nurses; served during World War II
- Penleigh Boyd, Australian artist
- Peter Boyd, American bridge player
- Peter Boyd (Trevor Eve), fictional character in the TV series Waking the Dead
- Paul Boyd (disambiguation)

== R ==
- Rakeem Boyd (born 1998), American football player
- Rhea Boyd, American paediatrician
- Richard Boyd (1942–2021), American philosopher
- Richard Henry Boyd (R.H. Boyd, 1843–1922), African American minister and religious publisher
- Richard Boyd Barrett (born 1967), Irish politician
- Robbie Boyd, British singer/songwriter
- Robert Boyd (disambiguation)
- Robert Boyd, 1st Lord Boyd (d. 1482)
- Robert Boyd, 4th Lord Boyd (d. c.1557) (acceded Lordship 1547)
- Robert Boyd, 5th Lord Boyd (c.1517–1559) (acceded Lordship 1558)
- Robert Boyd, 7th Lord Boyd (1595–1628)
- Robert Boyd, 8th Lord Boyd (c.1618–1640)
- Robin Boyd (architect) (1919–1971), Australian architect, writer, teacher and social commentator
- Robin Boyd (theologian) (1924–2018), Irish theologian and missionary to India
- Russell Boyd (born 1944), Australian cinematographer

== S ==
- Sam Boyd, American gambling entrepreneur
- Samuel S. Boyd (1807–1867), American enslaver
- Sarah Boyd-Carpenter (born 1946), now Sarah Hogg, Viscountess Hailsham, The Baroness Hogg, British economist, journalist, business executive and politician
- Seán Boyd (footballer), Irish footballer
- Sean Boyd (water polo), Australian water polo player
- Shannon Boyd (born 1992), Australian rugby league player
- Simon Lennox-Boyd, 2nd Viscount Boyd of Merton (born 1939), British peer
- Stephen Boyd, Irish actor
- Stephen P. Boyd, American professor and control theorist
- Stephen William Boyd, Irish professor

== T ==
- Terrence Boyd (born 1991), German-born American soccer player
- Thomas Boyd (disambiguation)
- Thomas Boyd, 1st Earl of Arran (died c. 1473), Scottish noble
- Thomas Boyd, 6th Lord Boyd (c.1547–1611) (acceded Lordship 1560)
- Travis Boyd (born 1993), American ice hockey player
- Tyler Boyd (American football), American football player

== V ==
- Valerie Boyd (1963–2022), American writer and academic

== W ==
- Walter Boyd (disambiguation)
- Wes Boyd, American software businessman and activist
- Willard L. Boyd (1927–2022), American lawyer, president of the University of Iowa and of the Field Museum of Natural History
- William Boyd (disambiguation)
- Woody Boyd, fictional character from Cheers

== Z ==
- Zachary Boyd, Scottish theologian
- Zoe Boyd (born 2000), Canadian ice hockey player
