= Baron of Grougar =

Title of nobility in the Baronage of Scotland

Baron of Grougar is a title of nobility in the Baronage of Scotland in north Ayrshire in the district formerly known as Cunninghame.

The earliest known family likely to have owned Grougar were the De Morvilles who were there in the twelfth and thirteenth centuries before the reign of Robert the Bruce. The De Morvilles originated in Morville, Department of Manche, Normandy, arrived in England in the wake of the Norman Conquest, settled in Burg, Cumbria, and later moved to Scotland in the early 12th century where they were granted land in Ayrshire. This land grant precedes the establishment of the Register of the Great Seal of Scotland so cannot be positively confirmed. Hugo de Morville who died in 1202 was the Constable of Scotland. By the late thirteenth century the Logan family were barons of Grougar. Thorbrand de Logan baron of Grougar is recorded in 1272 and a John de Logan of Grugar may be the John Logan described as ‘one of the king of England's enemies’ in 1307 during the Wars of Independence.

The current noble baron is The Much Honoured Dr Lianne Jennifer McLean, Baroness of Grougar

== History ==
The lands and barony of Grougar can be traced in the Register of the Great Seal of Scotland as from 1315. The earliest reference occurs between 1315 and 1321 when King Robert the Bruce granted a charter to Sir Robert Cunningham of the lands of Lambrachton and of Grugar in Cunningham [RGS.I.53]. Grougar remained in the hands of the Cunningham family until 19 January 1479 when Robert Cunningham resigned the lands of Grugar, which with the lands and barony of Snawde, the lands of Westbarns, lands of Carale, and the lands of Grugar, were incorporated into the lands and barony of Grougar, Ayrshire, by King James III and granted to Sir Robert Logan [RGS.II.1411].

Grougar had returned into the hands of its former owners the Logans a long established Ayrshire family and remained with them until the late sixteenth century. The principal branch of the family was the Logans of Restalrig near Edinburgh. One of its most prominent members was Sir Robert Logan of Restalrig who married Katherine Stewart, daughter of King Robert II of Scotland, and in 1400 became Admiral of Scotland.

On 18 May 1490, King James IV, granted Sir John Logan, son and heir apparent of Robert Logan of Restalrig and his wife Isabell, the lands of Grougar in the lordship of Cunningham, Ayrshire [RGS.II.1951]. On 2 January 1540, King James V granted Robert Logan, son and heir apparent of Sir Robert Logan of Restalrig, the lands and barony of Restalrig, and the lands and barony of Grougar with its mill etc. in the bailiary of Cunningham, which Robert Logan the elder and his wife Lady Elizabeth Hume had resigned, to be incorporated in the free barony of Restalrig [RGS.III.2056]. The Register of the Great Seal of Scotland records that on 13 August 1540, King James V granted Robert Logan, son and heir apparent of Sir Robert Logan of Restalrig, the lands of Grogar with its mill, tenantries, etc., in the lordship of Cunningham [RGS.III.2188].

Sir David Hamilton expanded the family's landholdings and accompanied King James V on his matrimonial voyage to France when he married Magdalene daughter of King Francis I of France. When the Earl of Hertford invaded Scotland in 1544 the town and castle of Preston was destroyed. Later Sir David was created Knight Banneret and Marischal Deputy of Scotland. Sir David also is noted as an early adherent of Protestantism in Scotland. He married Janet Baillie and they had 13 children of whom George, the eldest succeeded.

However, by the late sixteenth century Grougar was in the hands of a branch of the Graham family. The Grahams also are of Anglo-Norman origin who settled in Scotland in the early twelfth century during the reign of King David I of Scotland. On 18 February 1581 King James VI confirmed a charter by Robert Graham of Knockdolian allocating certain land within the barony of Grougar to Thomas Lyon of Glamis and his wife Lady Agnes Gray [RGS.V.111]. Robert Graham seem to have owned lands within the barony of Grougar by 1581 and ten years later the complete barony was his as on 3 March 1591 King James VI granted, for good service, the lands and barony of Grougar with its mill etc., in the bailiary of Cunningham, to John Graham of Knockdolian and his wife Lady Helen Kennedy [RGS.V.1834].

On his death John Graham of Knockdolian passed Grougar to his brother Robert according to an entry in the Inquisitionum ad Capellam Regis Retornatarum Abbreviatio, on 16 April 1606, Robert Graham of Grougar was served heir to his brother Lord John Graham of Knockdolian, in the lands and barony of Grougar in the bailiary of Cunningham [NAS. Retours, Ayr, 85]. Robert Graham evidently already owned land in south Ayrshire which he sold according to a deed in the National Archives of Scotland – on 30 April 1606, Robert Graham of Grougar, husband of Margaret Montgomerie, sold land in the parish of Colmonell [NRS.GD109.672].

The Grahams rule as Barons of Grougar was relatively brief as in 1613 the barony was granted to a branch of the Clan Campbell headed by Sir Hugh Campbell, first Lord Loudoun, Sheriff of Ayr and a Privy Councillor in Scotland.

On 27 July 1613, King James VI granted the barony of Grougar with its fortalice, manor place, mill, mill-lands, tenantry, etc., in the bailiary of Cunningham, Ayrshire, to Hugh, Lord Loudoun, and his heirs, formerly held by Robert Graham, Earl of Montrose, Lord Graham and Mugdock, lands in the nearby parish of Auchinleck, formerly held by Claud, Earl of Abercorn, were then incorporated in the free barony of Grougar [RGS.VII.896]. This grant was confirmed on 23 December 1613 [RGS.VII.967].

However Lord Loudoun's ownership of Grougar was very brief as within three years it was granted to the Boyds of Kilmarnock. King James VI granted Robert, Lord Boyd, the lands and barony of Grougar, which Hugh, Lord Loudoun, had resigned, 30 January 1616 [RGS.VII.1372]. Robert Boyd, 7th Lord Boyd, was born in November 1595 elder son of Thomas, 6th Lord Boyd, and died on 28 August 1628. On 11 December 1617, King James VI confirmed a charter of Robert, Lord Boyd, who under his marriage contract of 9 December 1617 granted his future wife Lady Christine Hamilton, Lady Lindsay, daughter of Thomas, Lord Binning president of the College of Justice and Secretary of State, the lands and barony of Grougar [RGS.VII.1733]. However, on 3 August 1619, the king confirmed Robert, Lord Boyd, with the lands and barony of Grougar [RGS.VII.2069].

Robert Boyd, 8th Lord Boyd, was born in 1618, he was a Justice of the Peace for Cunningham by 1634; he subscribed to the Scottish Covenant in 1638, he married Anna Fleming and died on 17 November 1640 and having no children his lands and titles went to his uncle James Boyd.

James Boyd, 9th Lord Boyd, was born around 1600; he was a Royalist during the Wars of the Three Kingdoms, 1638–1651. James Boyd married Catherine, second daughter of John Crayke in York before 1640. He died in 1654 leaving a son William and three daughters.

On 28 February 1655, William, 10th Lord Boyd, was served heir to his father James, Lord Boyd, in the lordship and barony of Kilmarnock which included the 40 pound land of the old extent and barony of Grougar [NAS. Retours, Ayr, 473]. Charles II created him Earl of Kilmarnock in 1661. Lord Boyd was a Commissioner of Excise for Ayr, a Justice of the Peace for Lanark, Dumbarton and Ayr. He married Lady Jean Cunningham, eldest daughter of William Cunningham, 9th Earl of Glencairn and they had five sons and three daughters of whom William succeeded his father when he died in March 1692.

On 11 August 1682, William, Lord Boyd, eldest son of William, Earl of Kilmarnock, was granted the lands of Kilmarnock [RGS.68.140]. On 20 July 1699, William, 3rd Earl of Kilmarnock, was served heir to his father William, 2nd Earl of Kilmarnock, in various lands including the above lands in the barony of Grougar [NAS. Retours, Ayr, 698]. The 3rd Earl voted for the Union with England in 1707 and was a staunch Hanoverian. He raised 500 men to oppose the Jacobites in 1715. He died on 22 November 1717 and was succeeded by his son William.

William Boyd, 4th Earl of Kilmarnock, was Grand Master Mason of Scotland in 1742. He, unlike his father, was a Jacobite and fought for Bonnie Prince Charlie with the rank of General and commander of the Horse Grenadier Guards. The Earl was captured at the Battle of Culloden in 1746 and later executed in London.

William Boyd, Earl of Kilmarnock, was executed as a Jacobite rebel in 1748, and his titles and lands in Ayrshire, Stirlingshire, and West Lothian were forfeited to the Crown on account of his treason. His son and heir James, Lord Boyd, who had fought for King George at the Battle of Culloden managed to regain some of the forfeited lands but he sold them in 1758. Lord Boyd was Grand Master Mason of Scotland in 1751.

The titles and lands of the Jacobite aristocrats and landowners who had supported and participated in the Jacobite rising of 1745 were forfeited to the Crown and the lands were subsequently sold off to speculators, one of whom was Sir George Colebrooke.

Sir George Colebrooke, born 1729, was Chairman of the East India Company, a merchant banker and a Member of Parliament. He was also a land speculator in New England, the Ohio Valley, Scotland and the West Indies, and also in raw materials which led to his downfall around 1777. Grougar would have been sold to William Blane around this time. In 1770 the lands of Grougar were owned by Sir George Colebrooke and were valued at £1497.16.0 according to Loretta R. Timberley's ‘A Directory of Landownership in Scotland c1770’ [Scottish Record Society, Edinburgh, 1976] Both Sir George Colebrooke and William Blane leased the various farmlands within the barony to tenant farmers. An insight into this practice can be had through an examination of the financial records, especially tacks (leases), of William Blane of Grougar which survive for the period 1796 to 1797 [NRS.GD237.21.19].

Grougar remained the property of members of the Blane family for nearly a century. A later William Blane extended his landholdings in the 1820s and 1830s through Crown Charters. He was granted a Crown Charter of the lands of Kirkdomine in 1825 [RGS.175.6]; another of the lands of Lammochie in 1830/1834 [NAS.195.9/205.23]. By the time of the New Statistical Account of 1845 one of the chief landowners in the parish of Kilmarnock was William Blane of Grougar. On 27 July 1857, a Crown Charter was granted in favour of William Blane of the lands and barony of Grougar to the trustees of William Blane [NAS. Ref. C2/258/130]. Eventually on 1 December 1881 the Trustees of William Blane sold the lands and barony of Grougar.

Grougar was sold to John White of Ardarroch, who as John White of Grougar and Ardarroch had arms bearing "an eagle displayed between three quatrefoils azure, on a chief of the second a besant between two garbs of the first". [James Balfour Paul's ‘An Ordinary of Arms’] Grougar remained in the hands of John White until 22 November 1904, when his trustees disposed of Grougar to William Cavendish-Bentinck, 6th Duke of Portland. On 13 September 1918, the Duke of Portland subscribed to a disposition and trust deed of the Barony of Grougar. From the Welbeck Estates Company Limited, the trustees acting under disposition and deed of trust by the Duke of Portland, the barony was acquired by Professor David Ian McLean. In 2015 the Barony was assigned to his daughter Dr. Lianne Jennifer McLean on the occasion of her wedding to Mr. Jon Loewen.
