= Robert Boyd =

Bob, Bobby, Robbie, Rob, or Robert Boyd may refer to:

== Arts and entertainment ==
- Robert Boyd (journalist) (1928–2019), American journalist, writer, and winner of the 1973 Pulitzer Prize for National Reporting
- Dice (rapper) (Robert Boyd, born 1970), American rapper
- Robert Boyd (director) (fl. 1980s–1990s), Canadian film director
- Robert Boyd (comics) (fl. 1990s), comics editor and critic on The Big Book Of
- Robbie Boyd, British singer and songwriter
- Robert Boyd (game developer), co-creator and lead developer of Zeboyd Games

== Nobility ==
- Robert Boyd, 1st Lord Boyd (died c. 1482), Scottish statesman
- Robert Boyd, 4th Lord Boyd (died 1557/8), Scottish nobleman, grandson of the 1st Lord Boyd
- Robert Boyd, 5th Lord Boyd (c. 1517–1590), Scottish nobleman
- Robert Boyd, 7th Lord Boyd (1595–1628), Scottish noble
- Robert Boyd, 8th Lord Boyd (c. 1618–1640), Scottish noble and politician

== Politics and law ==
- Robert Boyd (British Army officer) (1710–1794), British army officer and governor of Gibraltar
- Robert Boyd (civil servant) (fl. 1802–1812), British civil servant in British Ceylon
- Robert Boyd (Australian politician) (1885–1951), member of the Queensland Legislative Assembly
- Robert Boyd (military officer) (1805–1831), Irish officer in the army of the British East India Company

== Science and medicine ==
- Robert Boyd (writer) (1803–1883), British physician and writer on diseases of the insane
- Robert F. Boyd (1858–1912), American physician and dentist
- Robert A. Boyd (1918–2006), Canadian electrical engineer; leader of the James Bay hydroelectric project
- Robert Boyd (physicist) (1922–2004), Scottish physicist and pioneer of British space science
- Robert Boyd (paediatrician) (born 1938), British paediatrician
- Robert Boyd (anthropologist) (born 1948), American anthropologist
- Robert W. Boyd (born 1948), American optical physicist

== Sports ==
- Bob Boyd (footballer) (1867–1930), Scottish footballer
- Bob Boyd (baseball) (1919–2004), American first baseman in the Negro leagues and MLB
- Bob Boyd (American football) (1928–2009), American football end and wide receiver
- Bob Boyd (basketball) (1930–2015), American basketball coach
- Bobby Boyd (1937–2017), American football player for the Baltimore Colts
- Bob Boyd (ice hockey) (born 1951), Canadian ice hockey player
- Bob Boyd (golfer) (1955–2011), American golfer
- Rob Boyd (alpine skier) (born 1966), Canadian alpine skier

== Others ==
- Robert Boyd (university principal) (1578–1627), Principal of the University of Edinburgh
- Robert Napuʻuako Boyd (1863–1914), Hawaiian insurgent leader
- Robert Boyd (stenographer) (1870–?), Canadian inventor of Boyd's Syllabic Shorthand
- Robert Boyd (bishop) (1890–1958), Anglican bishop of Killaloe and Clonfert and of Derry and Raphoe
- Robert Boyd (RAF officer) (1916–1975), British flying ace of the Second World War
- Bobby Boyd, husband of fellow real estate agent Josh Flagg

== Other uses ==
- Robert Boyd Publications, English publishing company

== See also ==
- Robert Boyd Brazier (1916–1942), American naval officer
