= William Boyd =

William, Willie, Will or Bill Boyd may refer to:

== Academics and scholars ==
- William Boyd (educator) (1874–1962), Scottish educator
- William Boyd (pathologist) (1885–1979), Scottish-Canadian professor and author
- William Alexander Jenyns Boyd (1842–1928), Australian journalist and schoolmaster
- William Beaty Boyd (1923–2020), American university administrator
- William C. Boyd (1903–1983), American immunochemist
- William Christopher Boyd (1842–1906), British entomologist and numismatist

== Arts and entertainment ==
- Bill Boyd (musician) (1910–1977), American musician, leader of the band Bill Boyd and the Cowboy Ramblers
- William Boyd (actor) (1895–1972), American actor, better known as "Hopalong Cassidy"
- William "Stage" Boyd (1889–1935), American actor
- William Boyd (writer) (born 1952), Scottish novelist and screenwriter
- Will Boyd (musician) (born 1979), American bass guitarist for the band Evanescence
- Billy Boyd (William Nathan Boyd, born 1968), Scottish actor and musician

== Sports ==
- Bill Boyd (baseball) (1852–1912), American baseball player
- Bill Boyd (poker player) (1906–1997), American poker player
- William Robert Boyd (1930–2015), American basketball player and coach
- Willie Boyd (born 1958), Scottish footballer
- Billy Boyd (ice hockey) (William George Boyd, 1898–1940), Canadian ice hockey forward
- Billy Boyd (footballer) (William Gillespie Boyd, 1905–1967), Scottish footballer

== Others ==
- Bill Boyd (businessman) (born 1931), American businessman and co-founder of Boyd Gaming
- Bill Boyd (Canadian politician) (born 1956), Canadian politician, Saskatchewan Party MLA for Kindersley
- William Boyd, 3rd Earl of Kilmarnock (died 1717), Scottish nobleman
- William Boyd, 4th Earl of Kilmarnock (1704–1746), Scottish nobleman
- William Boyd (1774–1840), American silversmith with Shepherd and Boyd
- William Boyd (colonel) (fl. 1940s), US Army Air Forces base commander, referenced in Freeman Field mutiny
- William Boyd (minister) (died 1772), Irish Presbyterian minister
- William Boyd (priest) (1726–1795), Irish Anglican priest
- William Boyd III (born 1968/1969), New Hampshire state representative
- William L. Boyd Jr. (1825–1888), American slave trader, real estate broker, and steamboat captain
- William Young Boyd II (1926–2014), American businessman, author, and philanthropist
- Will Boyd (born 1971/1972), Alabama politician
- Billy Boyd (politician) (William Robinson Boyd, 1921–1989), politician from Northern Ireland

== See also ==
- Billy Boyd (disambiguation)
- William Boyde (born 1953), British actor
- Will Boyde (born 1994), Welsh rugby union player
- Bill and Boyd, New Zealand musical group
