= List of stage names: D =

This list of stage names lists names used by those in the entertainment industry, alphabetically by their stage name's surname (or the best approximation) followed by the given name (or the best approximation) where the surname begins with "D". One-word stage names are presented in List of one-word stage names.

Stage name	Birth name	Life	Notability	Notes
Chuck D	Carlton Douglas Ridenhour	1960–	American rapper (Public Enemy)	
Doris D	Debbie Jenner	1959–	British singer and dancer	
Master D	Saidullah Zaman	1978–	Bangladeshi-English rapper and singer (Asian Dub Foundation)	Also known as Deeder Zaman
Mike D	Michael Louis Diamond	1965–	American rapper, musician and producer (Beastie Boys)	
Piggy D.	Matthew Montgomery	1975–	American musician	
Willie D	William James Dennis	1966–	American rapper (Geto Boys)	
Jehanne d'Alcy	Charlotte Lucie Marie Adèle Stephanie Adrienne Faës	1865–1956	French actress	Also known as Jeanne d'Alcy
Jacques d'Amboise	Joseph Jacques Ahearn	1934–2021	American dancer	
Adrienne D'Ambricourt	Adrienne Dumontier	1878–1957	French-American actress	
Sharlee D'Angelo	Charles Petter Andreason	1973–	Swedish musician (Arch Enemy)	
Terence Trent D'Arby	Terence Trent Howard	1962–	American singer-songwriter	Also known as TTD; legally changed his name to Sananda Francesco Maitreya
Alexander D'Arcy	Alexandre Sarruf	1908–1996	Egyptian actor	
Roy D'Arcy	Roy Francis Giusti	1894–1969	American actor	
Peđa D'Boy	Predrag Jovanović	1950–	Serbian musician	
Shae D'lyn	Shae D'lyn Sherertz	1963–	American actress	
Daisy D'ora	Daisy Freiin von Freyberg zu Eisenberg	1913–2010	German actress, model and socialite	
Fifi D'Orsay	Marie-Rose Lussier	1904–1983	Canadian-American actress	
Frank D'Rone	Frank Caldarone	1932–2013	American jazz singer and guitarist	
Howard da Silva	Howard Silverblatt	1909–1986	American actor	
Morton DaCosta	Morton Tecosky	1914–1989	American director	
Lil Dagover	Marie Seubert	1887–1980	German actress	
Kat Dahlia	Katriana Sandra Huguet	1990–	Cuban-American singer-songwriter	Also known as Kat Hue
E. G. Daily	Elizabeth Guttman	1961–	American actress and singer	Also known as Elizabeth Daily
Toti Dal Monte	Antonietta Meneghel	1893–1975	Italian opera singer	
Alan Dale	Aldo Sigismondi	1925–2002	American singer	
Dick Dale	Richard Anthony Monsour	1937–2019	American guitarist	
Grover Dale	Grover Aitken	1935–	American actor and dancer	
Ice Dale	Arve Isdal	1977–	Norwegian musician and producer (Enslaved)	
Jim Dale	James Smith	1935–	English actor and singer	
Marcel Dalio	Israel Blauschild	1899–1983	French actor	
Bobby Dall	Robert Kuykendall	1963–	American musician (Poison)	
John Dall	John Thompson	1920–1971	American actor	
Béatrice Dalle	Béatrice Cabarrou	1964–	French actress	
Brody Dalle	Bree Robinson	1979–	Australian singer-songwriter (The Distillers)	Also known as Brody Armstrong and Brody Dalle-Homme
Sergio Dalma	Josep Sergi Capdevila Querol	1964–	Spanish singer	
Abby Dalton	Gladys Marlene Wasden	1932–2020	American actress	
Kristen Dalton	Kristen Valerie Hocking	1973–	American actress	
Lacy J. Dalton	Jill Lynne Byrem	1946–	American singer-songwriter	
Mr. Dalvin	Dalvin Ertimus DeGrate	1971–	American R&B and soul musician	
Michael Damian	Michael Damian Weir	1962–	American actor and singer	
Luca Damiano	Franco LoCascio	1946–	Italian director	
Lili Damita	Liliane Marie-Madeleine Carré	1904?–1994	French-American actress	
Jerry Dammers	Jeremy David Hounsell Dammers	1955–	British musician (The Specials)	
Mark Damon	Alan Harris	1933–2024	American actor and producer	
Vic Damone	Vito Rocco Farinola	1928–2018	American singer and actor	
Bill Dana	William Szathmary	1924–2017	American comedian and actor	
Vic Dana	Samuel Mendola	1942–	American singer, dancer and actor	
Viola Dana	Virginia Flugrath	1897–1987	American actress	
Karl Dane	Rasmus Karl Therkelsen Gottlieb	1886–1934	Danish-American comedian and actor	
Patricia Dane	Thelma Patricia Pippins	1917–1995	American actress	
Dottie Danger	Belinda Jo Carlisle	1958–	American singer	
Rodney Dangerfield	Jacob Cohen	1921–2004	American stand-up comedian	Legally changed his name to Jack Roy at the age of 19 and worked using that name early in his career
Elsa Daniel	Elsa Nilda Gómez Scapatti	1936–2017	Argentine actress	
Jennifer Daniel	Jennifer Ruth Williams	1936–2017	Welsh actress	
Lisa Daniely	Mary Elizabeth Bodington	1929–2014	English actress	
Sybil Danning	Sybille Johanna Danninger	1947–	Austrian actress	
Linda Dano	Linda Rae Wildermuth	1943–	American actress	
Cesare Danova	Cesare Deitinger	1926–1992	Italian actor	
Roberto Danova	Giacinto Bettoni	1937–	Italian composer, arranger and producer	
Nicholas Dante	Conrado Morales	1941–1991	American dancer and writer	
Helmut Dantine	Helmut Guttman	1918–1982	Austrian-American actor	
Henry Danton	Henry Down	1919–2022	English ballet dancer and teacher	
Ray Danton	Raymond Kaplan	1931–1992	American actor	
Tony Danza	Antonio Iadanza	1951–	American actor	
Glenn Danzig	Glenn Allen Anzalone	1955–	American singer and musician (Misfits)	
Ming Dao	Chao-chang Lin	1980–	Taiwanese actor, singer and model	
Olu Dara	Charles Jones III	1941–	American musician	
Blind Teddy Darby	Theodore Roosevelt Darby	1906–1975	American singer and guitarist	Also known as Blind Darby, Blind Blues Darby and Blind Squire Turner
Kim Darby	Deborah Zerby	1947–	American actress	
Mireille Darc	Mireille Christiane Gabrielle Aimée Aigroz	1938–2017	French model and actress	
Denise Darcel	Denise Billecard	1924–2011	French-American actress	
Hariclea Darclée	Hariclea Haricli	1860–1939	Romanian opera singer	
Sheila Darcy	Rebecca Benedict Heffener	1914–2004	American actress	
Phyllis Dare	Phyllis Constance Haddie Dones	1890–1975	English singer and actress	
Zena Dare	Florence Hariette Zena Dones	1887–1975	English singer and actress	
Anita Darian	Anita Margaret Esgandarian	1927–2015	American singer and actress	
Frank Darien	Frank Guderian	1876–1955	American actor	
Bobby Darin	Walden Robert Cassotto	1936–1973	American musician and actor	
Christopher Dark	Alfred Francis DeLeo	1920–1971	American actor	
Danny Dark	Daniel Melville Croskery	1938–2004	American artist	
Mona Darkfeather	Josephine Workman	1882–1977	American actress	
Jean Darling	Dorothy LeVake	1922–2015	American actress	
Grace Darmond	Grace Glionna	1893–1963	Canadian-American actress	
Mike Darow	Darow Myhowich	1933–1996	Canadian television personality	
Lisa Darr	Lisa Grabemann	1963–	American actress	
Dimebag Darrell	Darrell Lance Abbott	1966–2004	American musician (Pantera)	
James Darren	James William Ercolani	1936–2024	American actor	
Sonia Darrin	Sonia Paskowitz	1924–2020	American actress	
Frankie Darro	Frank Johnson Jr.	1917–1976	American actor	
Henry Darrow	Enrique Tomás Delgado Jiménez	1933–2021	American actor	
Paul Darrow	Paul Valentine Birkby	1941–2019	English actor	
Tony Darrow	Anthony Borgese	1938–	American actor	
Diana Darvey	Diana Magdalene Roloff	1945–2000	English actress, singer and dancer	
Bella Darvi	Bajla Węgier	1928–1971	Polish actress	
Jane Darwell	Patti Woodard	1879–1967	American actress	
Krishna Das	Jeffrey Kagel	1947–	American vocalist	
Deva Dassy	Marie-Anne Lambert	1911–2016	French opera singer	
Keith David	Keith David Williams	1956–	American actor	
Thayer David	David Thayer Hersey	1927–1978	American actor	
Jaye Davidson	Alfred Amey	1968–	American-English model and actor	
Jeremy Davidson	Jeremy Michael Greenberg	1971–	American actor, writer and director	
Marion Davies	Marion Cecilia Douras	1897–1961	American actress	
Reine Davies	Irene Douras	1883–1938	American actress	
Rosemary Davies	Rose Douras	1895–1963	American actress	
Billie Davis	Carol Hedges	1945–	English singer	
Gail Davis	Betty Jeanne Grayson	1925–1997	American actress and singer	
Jim Davis	Marlin Davis	1909–1981	American actor	
Skeeter Davis	Mary Frances Penick	1931–2004	American singer and songwriter	
Peter Davison	Peter Malcolm Gordon Moffett	1951–	English actor	
Bobby Davro	Robert Christopher Nankeville	1958–	English actor and comedian	
Marjorie Daw	Margaret House	1902–1979	American actress	
Liz Dawn	Sylvia Ann Butterfield	1939–2017	English actress	
Marpessa Dawn	Gypsy Menor	1934–2008	American-French actress	
Richard Dawson	Colin Lionel Emm	1932–2012	English-American actor and comedian	
Deco Dawson	Darryl Kinaschuk	1978–	Canadian filmmaker	
Shane Dawson	Shane Lee Yaw	1988–	American YouTuber	
Micheline Dax	Micheline Josette Renée Etevenon	1924–2014	French actress and singer	
Alice Day	Jacqueline Alice Irene Newlin	1906–1995	American actress	
Andra Day	Cassandra Monique Batie	1984–	American singer, songwriter and actress	
Bobby Day	Robert James Byrd	1930–1990	American singer and producer	
Darren Day	Darren Graham	1968–	English actor and singer	
Dennis Day	Owen Patrick Eugene McNulty	1916–1988	American actor and comedian	
Doris Day	Doris Mary Anne Kappelhoff	1922–2019	American actress, singer and activist	
Frances Day	Frances Victoria Schenk	1907–1984	American actress and singer	
Inaya Day	Inaya Davis	1977–	American singer	
Laraine Day	La Raine Johnson	1920–2007	American actress	
Marceline Day	Marceline Newlin	1908–2000	American actress	
Zella Day	Zella Day Kerr	1995–	American singer, songwriter and musician	
Taylor Dayne	Leslie Wunderman	1962–	American singer, songwriter; and actress	
Danny Dayton	Daniel David Segall	1923–1999	American actor and television director	
Ramón de Algeciras	Ramón Sánchez Gómez	1938–2009	Spanish flamenco guitarist	
Sandro de América	Roberto Sánchez-Ocampo	1945–2010	Argentine singer and actor	
Nigel De Brulier	Francis George Packer	1877–1948	English actor	
Arturo de Córdova	Arturo García Rodríguez	1908–1973	Mexican actor	
Chiquito de la Calzada	Gregorio Esteban Sánchez Fernández	1932–2017	Spanish flamenco singer and actor	
Camarón de la Isla	José Monje Cruz	1950–1992	Spanish flamenco singer	
Gerry de León	Gerardo Ilagan	1913–1981	Filipino director and actor	
Paco de Lucía	Francisco Gustavo Sánchez Gómez	1947–2014	Spanish flamenco guitarist, composer and record producer	
Pepe de Lucía	José Sánchez Gómez	1945–	Spanish flamenco singer and songwriter	
Lea de Mae	Andrea Absolonová	1976–2004	Czech model and actress	
Lapiro de Mbanga	Lambo Sandjo Pierre Roger	1957–2014	Cameroonian singer	
Julián de Meriche	Vladimir Lipkies Chazan	1910–1974	Russia-born Mexican actor and choreographer	
Michael de Mesa	Michael Edward Gil Eigenmann	1960–	Filipino actor and director	
Connagh Joseph "CJ" de Mooi	Andrew Paul Booth	1969–	British actor, writer, former professional quizzer and television personality	
Enzo de Muro Lomanto	Vincenzo DeMuro	1902–1952	Italian opera singer	
Ilma De Murska	Ema Pukšec	1834–1889	Croatian-Austrian opera singer	
Rossy de Palma	Rosa Elena García Echave	1964–	Spanish actress and model	
Lynsey de Paul	Lyndsey Rubin	1948–2014	English singer-songwriter and producer	
Manitas de Plata	Ricardo Baliardo	1921–2014	Spanish musician	
Alessandra De Rossi	Alessandra Tiotangco Schiavone	1984–	Filipina actress	
Assunta De Rossi	Assunta Tiotangco Schiavone	1983–	Filipina actress	
Portia de Rossi	Amanda Lee Rogers	1973–	Australian-American actress	
Ninette de Valois	Edris Stannus	1898–2001	Irish-English ballet dancer	
Valentin de Vargas	Albert Charles Schubert	1935–2013	American actor	
Jo De Winter	Juanita Maria-Johana Daussat	1921–2016	American actress	Also known as Jo de Winter and Juanita Adamina
Billy De Wolfe	William Andrew Jones	1907–1974	American actor	
Marie Déa	Odette Alice Marie Deupès	1912–1992	French actress	
Isabel Dean	Isabel Hodgkinson	1918–1997	English actress	
Loren Dean	Loren Dean Jovicic	1969–	American actor	
Margia Dean	Marguerite Louise Skliris	1922–2023	American actress	
Quentin Dean	Corinne Ida Margolin	1944–2003	American actress	
Shirley Deane	Shirley Deane Blattenberger	1913–1983	American actress	
Mickey Deans	Michael DeVinko Jr.	1934–2003	American musician and entrepreneur	
John Dearth	Kenneth Paton	1920–1984	British actor	
Inspectah Deck	Jason Hunter	1970–	American rapper and producer (Wu-Tang Clan)	
Gerry Dee	Gerard Francis-John Donoghue	1968–	Canadian actor and comedian	
Kiki Dee	Pauline Matthews	1947–	English singer	
Kool Moe Dee	Mohandas Dewese	1962–	American rapper	
Lenny Dee	Leonard George DeStoppelaire	1923–2006	American musician	
Mikkey Dee	Micael Kiriakos Delaoglou	1963–	Swedish musician (Motörhead)	
Sandra Dee	Alexandra Zuck	1942–2005	American actress and model	
Ruby Dee	Ruby Ann Wallace	1922–2014	American actress	
Simon Dee	Cyril Nicholas Henty-Dodd	1935–2009	English television presenter and disc jockey	
James Deen	Bryan Matthew Sevilla	1986–	American pornographic actor	
Olive Deering	Olive Corn	1918–1986	American actress	
Mos Def	Dante Terrell Smith	1973–	American rapper, singer-songwriter, and actor	Now known as Yasiin Bey
Carter DeHaven	Francis O'Callaghan	1886–1977	American actor and director	
John Dehner	John Dehner Forkum	1915–1992	American actor	
Carla Del Poggio	Maria Attanasio	1925–2010	Italian actress	
Lana Del Rey	Elizabeth Grant	1985–	American singer-songwriter	
Pilar Del Rey	Pilar Bougas	1929–2025	American actress	
Vanessa del Rio	Ana Maria Sanchez	1952–	American actress	
Eadie Del Rubio	Edith Bolling Boyd	1921–1996	American singer and musician (Del Rubio Triplets)	
Elena Del Rubio	Elena Rolfe Boyd	1921–2001	American singer and musician (Del Rubio Triplets)	
Milly Del Rubio	Mildred Stuart Boyd	1921–2011	American singer and musician (Del Rubio Triplets))	
Mila del Sol	Clarita Villarba Rivera	1923–2020	Filipina actress, entrepreneur and philanthropist	
Jan Delay	Jan Philipp Eißfeldt	1976–	German rapper and singer	
Bernard Delfont	Boris Isaakovich Winogradsky	1909–1994	Russian-English theatre impresario	
Claudia Dell	Claudia Dell Smith	1910–1977	American actress	
Dorothy Dell	Dorothy Goff	1915–1934	American actress	
Gabriel Dell	Gabriel Marcel Dell Vecchio	1919–1988	American actor	
Nathalie Delon	Francine Canovas	1941–2021	French actress, model, film director and writer	Also known as Nathalie Barthélémy
Danièle Delorme	Gabrielle Danièle Marguerite Andrée Girard	1926–2015	French actress and producer	
Samy Deluxe	Samy Sorge	1977–	German rapper and record producer	
David DeMaría	David Jiménez Pinteño	1976–	Spanish singer and songwriter	
Dr. Demento	Barret Eugene Hansen	1941–	American radio broadcaster and record collector	
Ellen Demming	Betty Ellen Weber	1922–2002	American actress	
Chaka Demus	John Taylor	1963–	Jamaican musician (Chaka Demus & Pliers)	
Susan Denberg	Dietlinde Zechner	1944–	German-Austrian model and actress	
Richard Denning	Louis Albert Heindrich Denninger Jr.	1914–1998	American actor	
Kat Dennings	Katherine Victoria Litwack	1986–	American actress	
Les Dennis	Leslie Dennis Heseltine	1953–	English television presenter, actor and comedian	
Willie Dennis	William DeBerardinis	1926–1965	American musician	
Reginald Denny	Reginald Leigh Dugmore	1891–1967	English actor	
Andrea Denver	Andrea Salerno	1991–	Italian fashion model	
John Denver	Henry John Deutschendorf Jr.	1943–1997	American musician, singer and actor	
Amir Derakh	Amir Davidson	1963–	American musician and producer (Julien-K)	
John Derek	Derek Delevan Harris	1926–1998	American actor and director	
Maya Deren	Eleonora Derenkovska	1917–1961	Ukrainian-American filmmaker	
Rick Derringer	Richard Dean Zehringer	1947–2025	American musician, singer and songwriter (The McCoys)	
Jackie DeShannon	Sharon Lee Myers	1941–	American singer-songwriter and radio broadcaster	
La Desideria	Ana González Olea	1915–2008	Chilean actress	
Kay Deslys	Kathleen Herbert	1899–1974	English-American actress	
Johnny Desmond	Giovanni Alfredo De Simone	1919–1985	American singer	
William Desmond	William Mannion	1878–1949	American actor	
Emmy Destinn	Emilie Pavlína Věnceslava Kittlová	1878–1930	Czech opera singer	
Sarah Jezebel Deva	Sarah Ferridge	1977–	English singer (Cradle of Filth)	
Anjali Devi	Anjali Kumari	1927–2014	Indian actress	
C.C. DeVille	Bruce Johannesson	1962–	American musician (Poison)	
Willy DeVille	William Borsey Jr.	1950–2009	American singer and songwriter (Mink DeVille)	
Magenta Devine	Kim Taylor	1957–2019	English television presenter and journalist	
Dorothy Devore	Alma Williams	1899–1976	American actress	
Howard Devoto	Howard Trafford	1952–	English singer and songwriter (Buzzcocks and Magazine)	
Elaine Devry	Thelma Mahnken	1930–2023	American actress	
Anthony Dexter	Walter Fleischmann	1913–2001	American actor	
Brad Dexter	Boris Soso	1917–2002	American actor	
Jerry Dexter	Jerry Morris Chrisman	1935–2013	American actor and radio presenter	
Agyness Deyn	Laura Michelle Hollins	1983–	English actress and model	
Buck Dharma	Donald Brian Roeser	1947–	American musician (Blue Öyster Cult)	
Khigh Dhiegh	Kenneth Dickerson	1910–1991	American actor	
Amy Diamond	Amy Deasismont	1992–	Swedish singer	
King Diamond	Kim Bendix Petersen	1956–	Danish musician	
Mo B. Dick	Raymond Emile Poole	1965–	American rapper	
Angie Dickinson	Angeline Brown	1931–	American actress	
Gloria Dickson	Thais Dickerson	1917–1945	American actress	
Roy Ward Dickson	Richard del Valle	1910–1978	Canadian producer and writer	
Bo Diddley	Ellas McDaniel	1928–2008	American guitarist	
Trife Diesel	Theo Bailey	1980–	American rapper	Also known as Trife da God
Vin Diesel	Mark Sinclair	1967–	American actor	
Anton Diffring	Alfred Pollack	1916–1989	German actor	
Rah Digga	Rashia Fisher	1974–	American rapper	
Bobby Digital	Robert Dixon	1961–2020	Jamaican producer	
J Dilla	James Yancey	1974–2006	American rapper	Also known as Jay Dee
Daz Dillinger	Delmar Arnaud	1973–	American rapper and producer	
Ronnie James Dio	Ronald Padavona	1942–2010	American singer	
Rose Dione	Claudine Gras	1877–1936	French-American actress	
Iann Dior	Michael Ian Olmo	1999–	American musician	
Mike Dirnt	Michael Pritchard	1972–	American musician (Green Day)	
Emilio Disi	Emilio Parada	1943–2018	Argentine actor	
Richard Dix	Ernst Brimmer	1893–1949	American actor	
Tommy Dix	Bobby Navard	1923–2025	American singer and actor	
Floyd Dixon	Jay Riggins Jr.	1929–2006	American pianist and singer	
Jean Dixon	Jean Jacques	1893–1981	American actress	
Lew Dockstader	George Clapp	1856–1924	American singer, performer and comedian	
John Doe	John Duchac	1953–	American musician, singer songwriter and actor (X)	
Phife Dog	Malik Taylor	1970–2016	American rapper (A Tribe Called Quest)	
Sen Dog	Senen Reyes	1965–	Cuban-American rapper and musician (Cypress Hill, Powerflo and SX-10)	
Deso Dogg	Denis Cuspert	1975–2018	Ghanaian-German rapper	
Nate Dogg	Nathaniel Hale	1969–2011	American singer and rapper	
Snoop Dogg	Calvin Broadus Jr.	1971–	American rapper	
Swamp Dogg	Jerry Williams Jr.	1942–	American singer, musician, songwriter and record producer	Also known as Little Jerry and Little Jerry Williams
Tymon Dogg	Stephen Murray	1950–	English singer-songwriter and musician (The Mescaleros)	
Bebi Dol	Dragana Šarić	1962–	Serbian-Yugoslav singer and songwriter	
Thomas Dolby	Thomas Robertson	1958–	English musician, producer and composer	
Micky Dolenz	George Dolenz Jr.	1945–	American actor, musician (The Monkees), TV producer and businessman	
Anton Dolin	Sydney Healey-Kay	1904–1983	English ballet dancer	
Dora Doll	Dorothea Feinberg	1922–2015	French actress	
Stefflon Don	Stephanie Victoria Allen	1991–	English rapper	
Troy Donahue	Merle Johnson Jr.	1936–2001	American actor and singer	
Richard Donner	Richard Schwartzberg	1930–2021	American filmmaker	
Martin Donovan	Martin Smith	1957–	American actor	
Shabba Doo	Adolfo Quiñones	1955–2020	American actor and dancer	
Lorna Doom	Teresa Ryan	1958–2019	American musician (Germs)	
Edsel Dope	Brian Ebejer	1974–	American singer and musician (Dope)	
Karin Dor	Kätherose Derr	1938–2017	German actress	
Teya Dora	Teodora Pavlovska	1992–	Serbian singer, songwriter and producer	
Lucy Doraine	Ilona Kovács	1898–1989	Hungarian actress	
Irma Dorantes	Irma Aguirre Martínez	1934–	Mexican actress, singer and equestrian	
Johnny Dorelli	Giorgio Guidi	1937–	Italian actor, singer and television presenter	
Jorge Dória	Jorge Ferreira	1920–2013	Brazilian actor and humorist	
Maurice Dorléac	Georges Maurice Edmond Dorléac	1901–1979	French actor	
Philip Dorn	Hein van der Niet	1901–1975	Dutch-American actor	
Marie Doro	Marie Steward	1882–1956	American actress	
Diana Dors	Diana Fluck	1931–1984	English actress and singer	
David Dortort	David Katz	1916–2010	American screenwriter and producer	
Anita Doth	Anita Dels	1971–	Dutch singer and songwriter	
Tito Double P	Jesús Roberto Laija García	1997–	Mexican rapper and singer	
Doug E. Doug	Douglas Bourne	1970–	American actor and comedian	
Jon Dough	Chester Joseph Anuszak	1962–2006	American actor	
Don Douglas	Douglas Kinleyside	1905–1945	Scottish actor	
Donna Douglas	Doris Smith	1932–2015	American actress	
Gordon Douglas	Gordon Brickner	1907–1993	American director and actor	
Hal Douglas	Harold Cohen	1924–2014	American actor	
Illeana Douglas	Illeana Hesselberg	1961–	American actress and filmmaker	
Jerry Douglas	Gerald Rubenstein	1932–2021	American actor	
Kirk Douglas	Issur Danielovitch	1916–2020	American actor and filmmaker	
Mike Douglas	Michael Delaney Dowd Jr.	1921–2006	American singer, entertainer, television host and actor	
Paul Douglas	Paul Douglas Fleischer	1907–1959	American actor	
Robert Douglas	Robert Finlayson	1909–1999	English actor	
Sharon Douglas	Rhodanelle Rader	1920–2016	American actress	
Steve Douglas	Steven Kreisman	1938–1993	American musician	
Billie Dove	Bertha Bohny	1903–1997	American actress	
Peggy Dow	Peggy Varnadow	1928–	American actress	
M'el Dowd	Mary Ellen Dowd	1933–2012	American actress and singer	
Taime Downe	Gustave Molvik	1964–	American singer	Also known as Vaunn Hammer
Billy Drago	William Burrows	1945–2019	American actor	
Alfred Drake	Alfred Capurro	1914–1992	American actor	
Charles Drake	Charles Ruppert	1917–1994	American actor	
Dona Drake	Eunice Westmoreland	1914–1989	American singer, dancer and actress	
Frances Drake	Frances Dean	1912–2000	American actress	
Simon Drake	Simon Alexander	1957–	English magician	
Tom Drake	Alfred Alderdice	1918–1982	American actor	
DJ Drama	Tyree Simmons	1978–	American DJ	
Doctor Dré	André Brown	1963–	American radio personality	
Dr. Dre	Andre Young	1965–	American rapper and producer	
Mac Dre	Andre Hicks	1970–2004	American rapper	
Judge Dread	Alexander Minto Hughes	1945–1998	English singer	
Mikey Dread	Michael Campbell	1954–2008	Jamaican musician	
Louise Dresser	Louise Kerlin	1878–1965	American actress	
Marie Dressler	Leila Koerber	1868–1934	Canadian-American actress and comedian	
Christofer Drew	Christopher Ingle	1991–	American musician (Never Shout Never)	
Ellen Drew	Esther Ray	1914–2003	American actress	
Robert Drivas	Robert Chromokos	1935–1986	American actor and director	
Joanne Dru	Joan LaCock	1922–1996	American actress	
Sky du Mont	Cayetano du Mont	1947–	German-Argentine actor	
John Du Prez	Trevor Jones	1946–	British musician, conductor and composer	
Lima Duarte	Ariclenes Martins	1930–	Brazilian actor	
Marie Dubois	Claudine Huzé	1937–2014	French actress	
Paulette Dubost	Paulette Deplanque	1910–2011	French actress	
Dave Dudley	David Pedruska	1928–2003	American singer	
Mickey Duff	Monek Prager	1929–2014	Polish-English boxer	
Julia Duffy	Julia Hinds	1951–	American actress	
Doris Duke	Doris Curry	1912–1993	American philanthropist, horticulturist and socialite	
Vernon Duke	Vladimir Dukelsky	1903–1969	Russian-American composer and songwriter	
Chuck Dukowski	Gary McDaniel	1954–	American musician (Black Flag)	
Margaret Dumont	Daisy Baker	1882–1965	American actress	
Steffi Duna	Erzsébet Berindey	1910–1992	Hungarian-American actress	
Kenne Duncan	Kenneth Duncan Mac Lachlan	1903–1972	Canadian character actor	
Elaine Dundy	Elaine Rita Brimberg	1921–2008	American writer and actress	
Stephen Dunham	Stephen Dunham Bowers	1964–2012	American actor	
Don Durant	Donald Allison Durae	1932–2005	American actor	
Rocío Dúrcal	María de los Ángeles de las Heras Ortiz	1944–2006	Spanish singer and actress	
Michael Durrell	Sylvester Salvatore Ciraulo	1939–	American actor	
Slim Dusty	David Gordon Kirkpatrick	1927–2003	Australian singer-songwriter	
Guru Dutt	Vasanth Padukone	1925–1964	Indian director, producer and actor	
María Duval	María Dussage Ortiz	1937–	Mexican actress and singer	
Norma Duval	Purificación Martín Aguilera	1956–	Spanish vedette and actress	
Ann Dvorak	Anna McKim	1911–1979	American actress	
Dorothy Dwan	Dorothy Ilgenfritz	1906–1981	American actress	
Bob Dylan	Robert Zimmerman	1941–	American musician	Now legally Robert Dylan
Ms. Dynamite	Niomi Daley	1981–	British rapper	
