= Stephen Boyd (disambiguation) =

Stephen Boyd (1931–1977) was a Northern-Irish actor.

Stephen Boyd may also refer to:

- Stephen Boyd (American football) (born 1972), American football linebacker
- Stephen Boyd (attorney) (born 1979), American public official and attorney
- Stephen Boyd (New Hampshire politician), New Hampshire state legislator
- Stephen Boyd (Maryland politician), American politician from Maryland
- Stephen P. Boyd, American professor and control theorist
- Stephen Boyd (athlete) in 1993 IAAF World Cross Country Championships – Senior men's race
- Steve Boyd on List of P-Funk members
- Steven Boyd (born 1997), Scottish footballer
- Stephen William Boyd, professor of tourism at the University of Ulster, Northern Ireland
