= Walter Boyd =

Walter Boyd may refer to:

- Walter Boyd (Jamaican footballer) (born 1972), retired football striker from Jamaica
- Walter Boyd (Scottish footballer) (born 1956)
- Walter Boyd (financier) (1754–1837), English financier and member of parliament
- Walter Boyd (Mississippi politician), state legislator in Mississippi
- Sir Walter Boyd, 1st Baronet (1833–1918), of the Boyd baronets
- Sir Walter Herbert Boyd, 2nd Baronet (1867–1948) of the Boyd baronets
- Lead Belly (1888–1949), American folk and blues musician, who hid under the name Walter Boyd after escaping from prison
- Walter Boyd, the first candidate of the One New Zealand Party
- Walter Boyd (1796 ship), the East Indiaman Oosthuizen of the Dutch East India Company

== See also ==
- Boyd (surname)
