= James E. Boyd =

James E. Boyd may refer to:

- James E. Boyd (politician) (1834–1906), Governor of Nebraska
- James E. Boyd (scientist) (1906–1998), American physicist, mathematician, and professor
- James Edmund Boyd (1845–1935), United States federal judge

== See also ==
- James Boyd (disambiguation)
