= Jeremiah W. Farnham =

American merchant sailor (??–1905)

Jeremiah W. Farnham (born in Camden, Maine; died February 20, 1905, Seattle, Washington) was an American merchant sailor and sea captain.

Captain Jeremiah (Jerry) W. Farnham, was a well-known resident of Seattle, Washington, with a great interest in all public affairs. Observing Seattle’s growth from a small town, he predicted a great future for the city.

At age 15, Farnham left his home in Camden, Maine to become a sailor. From that time until he retired at age 66, Farnham was on the water, either as a sailor or as the master of his own ship.

He came to the West Coast in 1859, and from that time made either San Francisco or Seattle his home.

Farnham sailed ships from Seattle for George Anson Meigs of Port Madison, and also owned his own vessels. At age 66, Farnham retired, and since that time he made Seattle his home.

In January 1905, at age 76, he was stricken with heart disease, and had been confined to his home since then. When he died, Farnham was unmarried, and had a brother and two sisters, including Nancy S. Farnham, who married Captain George W. Boyd.
