= Billy Boyd (disambiguation) =

Billy Boyd (born 1968) is a Scottish actor and musician.

Billy Boyd may also refer to:

- Billy Boyd (ice hockey) (1898–1940), Canadian ice hockey forward
- Billy Boyd (footballer) (1905–1967), Scottish professional footballer
- Billy Boyd (politician) (1921–1989), Northern Irish politician

== See also ==
- William Boyd (disambiguation)
