= Chris Boyd =

Chris or Christopher Boyd may refer to:

- Chris Boyd (rugby union) (born 1958), New Zealand rugby coach
- Christopher Boyd (IT security), computer security expert
- Christopher Boyd (politician) (1916–2004), British politician

== See also ==
- Kris Boyd (born 1983), Scottish footballer
- Kris Boyd (American football) (born 1996), American football player
