= David Boyd =

David Boyd may refer to:

== Entertainment ==
- David Boyd (artist) (1924–2011), Australian artist
- David Boyd (author) (1951–2025), Canadian children's author
- David Boyd (cinematographer), American cinematographer
- David Boyd (singer) (born 1988), Danish-American lead singer of the band New Politics
- David James Boyd (born 1975), American composer and actor

== Sports ==
- Dave Boyd (1927–2017), Australian rules footballer
- David Boyd (cricketer) (born 1955), Australian cricketer
- David Boyd (footballer) (1870–1909), Scottish footballer
- David Boyd (rugby league) (born 1966), Australian rugby league player

== Other ==
- David Boyd (murderer), British convicted murderer
- David Boyd (surgeon) (born 1937), American surgeon
- David French Boyd (1834–1899), Confederate army officer
- David R. Boyd, Canadian UN Special Rapporteur on Human Rights and the Environment
- David Ross Boyd (1853–1936), American academic
- David William Boyd (born 1941), Canadian mathematician

== See also ==
- Boyd (surname)
