= Greg Boyd (disambiguation) =

Greg Boyd (born 1957) is an American theologian, pastor and author.

Greg or Gregory Boyd may also refer to:

- Greg Boyd (American football) (born 1952), American football player
- S. Gregory Boyd, American author, attorney and academic

== See also ==
- Greg Boyed (1970–2018), New Zealand journalist and television presenter
