= Thomas Boyd =

Thomas, Tom or Tommy Boyd may refer to:

== Political figures ==
- Thomas A. Boyd (1830–1897), U.S. Representative from Illinois
- Thomas Boyd (Australian politician) (1802–1860), banker and member of the New South Wales Legislative Council in 1845
- Thomas Boyd (Wisconsin politician) (1844–1915), Wisconsin State Assemblyman
- Thomas Boyd Caldwell (1856–1932), Canadian politician
- Tom Boyd (Northern Ireland politician) (1903–1991), Northern Irish political figure
- Christopher Boyd (politician) (Thomas Christopher Boyd, 1916–2004), British politician
- Tom Boyd (Idaho politician) (1928–2015), American farmer and politician
- Thomas Boyd, 6th Lord Boyd (1547–1611), Scottish noble and politician

== Sportspeople ==
- Tom Boyd (gridiron football) (born 1959), American player of gridiron football
- Tom Boyd (Scottish footballer) (born 1965), Scottish football player (Motherwell FC, Chelsea FC, Celtic FC, Scotland national team)
- Tom Boyd (Australian footballer) (born 1995), Australian rules footballer
- Tom Boyd (golfer) (1888–1952), Irish-American golfer

== Other people ==
- Lt. Thomas Boyd (died 1779)
- Thomas Alexander Boyd (1898–1935), American novelist
- Thomas Boyd, Earl of Arran (died c. 1473), Scottish nobleman
- Tommy Boyd (born 1952), British media personality
- Thomas Jamieson Boyd (1818–1902), publisher and philanthropist
- Sir Thomas Boyd of Kilmarnock, 14th-century Scottish landowner and lord of Kilmarnock in Ayrshire
