= George Boyd =

George Boyd may refer to:

- George Boyd (footballer) (born 1985), Scottish footballer
- George Boyd (playwright) (1952–2020), Canadian playwright
- George Milward Boyd (1851–1940), Canadian politician
- George Boyd (potter) (1825–1886), New Zealand potter
- George W. Boyd, American politician

== See also ==
- George Boyd-Rochfort (1880–1940), Irish recipient of the Victoria Cross
