= Web widget =

Applet intended to be used within web pages

A web widget is a web page or web application that is embedded as an element of a host web page but which is substantially independent of the host page, having limited or no interaction with the host. A web widget commonly provides users of the host page access to resources from another web site, content that the host page may be prevented from accessing itself by the browser's same-origin policy or the content provider's CORS policy. That content includes advertising (Google's AdSense), sponsored external links (Taboola), user comments (Disqus), social media buttons (Twitter, Facebook), news (USA Today), and weather (AccuWeather). Some web widgets though serve as user-selectable customizations of the host page itself (Common Ninja, Elfsight, Powr, OpenWidget).

== Usage in social media ==
End users primarily use widgets to enhance their personal web experiences, or the web experiences of visitors to their personal sites.

The use of widgets has proven increasingly popular, where users of social media are able to add stand-alone applications to blogs, profiles and community pages. Widgets add utility in the same way that an iPhone application does. The developers of these widgets are often offering them as a form of sponsored content, which can pay for the cost of the development when the widgets' utility maps to the user's needs in a way where both parties gain. For example, a sports news brand might gain awareness and increased audience share in exchange for the utility of current game scores being instantly and dynamically available - the blog which posted the Sports score widget might gain in having a stickier site.

Video platforms such as YouTube and Dailymotion support iframe-based video embedding.

== Security considerations ==
As any program code, widgets can be used for malicious purposes. One example is the Facebook "Secret Crush" widget, reported in early 2008 by Fortinet as luring users to install Zango adware.

One important factor with client-side widgets is that often the host can not control the content. The content or the functionality it provides cannot be modified by the host. The content is pre-published by the publisher/author/service provider and the host can either accept that content or not use the widget. The host does, however, control the placement of the Widget. Because the host can always take the Widget down, it assures a large degree of mutual advantage and satisfaction with performance and content.

== SEO considerations ==
Links generated by client-side widgets will not be seen by search engines that do not run the widget code before analysing the page. Those links will not contribute to page rank.

== Widget management systems ==
Widget management systems offer a method of managing widgets that works on any web page, such as a blog or social networking home page. Many blog systems come with built-in widget management systems as plug-ins. Users can obtain widgets and other widget management tools from various widget companies.

== Mobile Web widget ==
A Mobile Web widget has the same purpose and function as a web widget, but it is made for use on a mobile device such as mobile phone or tablet. In contrast, a web widget is on a personal computer or laptop computer.
