= Cunninghame =

Area of Scotland, comprising the northern part of Ayrshire

Coordinates: 55.634°N 4.780°W

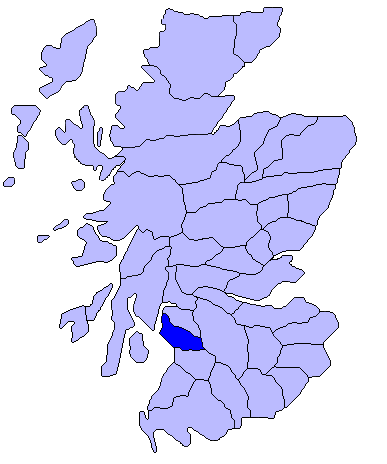
Map of Scotland showing the historic district of Cunninghame

Cunninghame (Scottish Gaelic: Coineagan) is a former comital district of Scotland and also the name of a district of the Strathclyde Region from 1975 to 1996.

== Historic Cunninghame ==
The origin of the name (along with the surname Cunningham) is uncertain. The ending -hame is from Old English hām ('home, village'). The first component may be either Old English cyning, cuning ('king') or Gaelic coineanach ('rabbit'). Irvine, a former capital of Scotland, was the capital of Cunninghame, indicating its status as a royal burgh. The family crest includes the unicorn, which is restricted to the Crown, and Clans Cunningham, Oliphant, and Ramsay.

The historic district of Cunninghame was bordered by the districts of Renfrew and Clydesdale to the north and east respectively, by the district of Kyle to the south over the River Irvine and by the Firth of Clyde to the west.

Cunninghame as the northernmost district of Ayrshire

Cunninghame became one of the three districts or bailieries of Ayrshire, the shire or sheriffdom of Ayr. Cunninghame was in the north, along the River Irvine; Kyle was in the centre, along the River Ayr; and Carrick was in the south, along the River Doon. By the eighteenth century Ayrshire had become one of the counties of Scotland, with the three bailieries being described as "districts" or "divisions" of the county, although they had no formal administrative existence.

In the late nineteenth century the "territorial division" was described as comprising the civil parishes of Ardrossan, Beith, Dalry, Dreghorn, Fenwick, Irvine, North Ayrshire, Kilbirnie, West Kilbride, Kilmarnock, Kilmaurs, Kilwinning, Largs, Loudoun, Stevenston, Stewarton and part of Dunlop.

The Cunninghame poor law combination was formed in the 1850s with a poorhouse at Irvine but had a different area from the ancient district.

== Local government district ==
The Cunninghame name was revived for a local government district created in 1975 under the Local Government (Scotland) Act 1973, which established a two-tier structure of local government across Scotland comprising upper-tier regions and lower-tier districts. Cunninghame was one of nineteen districts created within the region of Strathclyde. The district covered the whole area of three former districts from the historic county of Buteshire and nine former districts from Ayrshire, plus small parts of a further two districts within the designated area for Irvine New Town:

== See also ==
- Subdivisions of Scotland
- The Scottish feudal barony of Grougar
