= Archie Boyd (footballer) =

Scottish footballer

Personal information
- Full name: Archibald Renwick Boyd
- Date of birth: 1890
- Place of birth: Seafield, Scotland
- Date of death: 29 September 1945 (aged 54–55)
- Place of death: Vancouver, British Columbia Canada
- Position: Goalkeeper

Youth career
- 1910–1913: Mossend Burnvale

Senior career*
Years	Team	Apps	(Gls)
1913–1914	Bo'ness		
1914	Partick Thistle		
1914–1916	Heart of Midlothian	74	(0)
- * Club domestic league appearances and goals

Archibald Boyd (1890 – 29 September 1945) was a Scottish professional footballer who played as a goalkeeper in the Scottish League for Heart of Midlothian.

== Personal life ==
Boyd worked as a shale miner. His brother James was also a footballer for Heart of Midlothian and after the outbreak of the First World War in August 1914, the brothers were faced with the choice of which was to go to war. James made the decision to enlist, as Archie was engaged to be married. James was killed on the Somme while serving with McCrae's Battalion in August 1916.

== Career statistics ==
Appearances and goals by club, season and competition
Club	Season	League			Scottish Cup		Other		Total	
Club	Season	Division	Apps	Goals	Apps	Goals	Apps	Goals	Apps	Goals
Heart of Midlothian	1914–15	Scottish First Division	38	0	—		6 (Note: 3 appearances in East of Scotland Shield, 2 appearances in Dunedin Cup, 1 appearance in Wilson Cup)	0	44	0
Heart of Midlothian	1915–16	Scottish First Division	36	0	—		0	0	36	0
Career total			74	0	0	0	6	0	80	0

== Honours ==
Heart of Midlothian

- East of Scotland Shield: 1914–15
- Dunedin Cup: 1914–15
- Wilson Cup: 1914–15
