= Paul Boyd =

Paul Boyd may refer to:

- Paul Boyd (director), Scottish music video, commercial and feature film director
- Paul Boyd (journalist) (born 1976), American-based Canadian television journalist
- Paul Boyd (animator) (1967–2007), Canadian animator
