= Robert Boyd (writer) =

Robert Boyd (1808–1883), was a physician and writer on mental illness, who, in 1870 became president of the Medico-Psychological Association (now the Royal College of Psychiatrists).

== Life ==
Boyd became a member of the Royal College of Surgeons in 1830, and in the following year graduated M.D. in the University of Edinburgh. In 1836 he became a licentiate of the Royal College of Physicians, and in 1852 was elected to the fellowship of the college. For some time he was resident physician at the Marylebone workhouse infirmary, and afterwards physician and superintendent of the Somerset county lunatic asylum. He then became proprietor and manager of the Southall Park private asylum, which was destroyed in August 1883 by a fire; he lost his life after re-entering the burning building to rescue thepatients.

In the various positions in which he was placed he utilised to the utmost his opportunities for original research. He was also a Fellow of the Zoological Society and also an antiquarian.

== Writings ==
He published the annual Reports on the Pauper Lunatics at the St. Marylebone infirmary and the Somerset county asylum, and contributed numerous independent papers to the literature of pathology and psychological medicine. He was the author of pathological contributions to the Royal Medical and Chirurgical Transactions, vols. xxiv. and xxxii., and to the Edinburgh Medical Journal, vols. lv. to lxxii.; of Tables of the Weights of the Human Body and Internal Organs, in the Philosophical Transactions; and of a paper, The Weight of the Brain at different Ages and in various Diseases.

He contributed no fewer than sixteen papers to the Journal of Mental Science on "Treatment of the Insane Poor", "Diseases of the Nervous System", "Statistics of Pauper Insanity", and cognate subjects, the most important being that on "General Paralysis of the Insane" in the Journal of Mental Science for May and October 1871, the result of 155 post-mortem examinations of persons who had died from that disease in the Somerset county asylum. He was also the author of three papers on "vital statistics", "Insanity", and "The Pauper Lunacy Laws", published in The Lancet.
