= Justin Boyd =

Justin Boyd may refer to:

- Justin Boyd (water polo)
- Justin Boyd (politician)
- Justin Boyd (rugby union)
