= David James Boyd =

African-American composer and actor

David James Boyd (born May 27, 1975) is an African American writer, composer and lyricist perhaps best known for composing the original music and lyrics for the off-Broadway play My Big Gay Italian Wedding.

Boyd's Broadway career started as an actor in multiple Broadway shows including Miss Saigon and Kiss of the Spider Woman. In 2012, Boyd created and starred in the dance/electronic musical The Groove Factory. Written along with co-librettist Chad Kessler, the musical opened to sold-out audiences at the 2012 New York Musical Theatre Festival.

In addition to theatre work, Boyd has co-produced music for artists Taylor Dayne, Judy Torres, Kim Sozzi, Ari Gold, Jason Dottley, Levi Kreis, and Inaya Day among others. In 2013, Boyd became musical director on the Emmy-nominated soap opera web series Tainted Dreams.
