= William Boyd (priest) =

Irish Anglican priest

William Boyd (6 January 1726 – 29 August 1795) was an Irish Anglican priest.

Huson was born in County Kildare and educated at Trinity College, Dublin, He was Archdeacon of Leighlin from 1776 to 1777; and Archdeacon of Ferns from 1777 until his death.
