= Thomas Boyd, 6th Lord Boyd =

Scottish noble and politician

Thomas Boyd, 6th Lord Boyd (c. 1547–1611) was a Scottish noble and politician.

== Biography ==
Thomas Boyd, with his father, Robert Boyd, 5th Lord Boyd, fought at the battle of Langside on 13 May 1568, for Mary, Queen of Scots. He inherited the title Lord Boyd on the death of 5th Lord Boyd in 1590. He resigned his whole estate to the King, from whom, on 12 January 1592, (Note: Julian dates with 1 January as the start of year (See Old Style and New Style dates)) he obtained a new charter thereof, "erecting the same into a free Lordship and Barony, to be called the Lordship and Barony of Kilmarnock" to himself for life, with remainder to his son and heir apparent, Robert, Master of Boyd, in tail male, remainder to "heirs male," thereby excluding the heirs general. Under this grant Thomas, not improbably, became Lord Boyd of Kilmarnock. He died June 1611. As Robert died before his father, (Note: Thomas Boyd had a son Robert Boyd, styled Master of Boyd, his heir apparent. The son married before 1595, Jean, daughter of Mark (Kerr), Earl of Lothian, by Margaret, daughter of John (Maxwell), Lord Herries. He died v.p. May 1597. His widow married between 4 March 1606 and 16 April 1610, David (Lindsay), Earl of Crawford, by whom she had no issue, and from whom she was divorced. She married 3rdly, before 16 February 1618, Thomas Hamilton, of Robertoun (Cokayne 1912, p. 262).) the estates and title passed to his son Robert.

== Family ==
Thomas was the second but first surviving son and heir of Robert Boyd, 5th Lord Boyd.

Thomas Boyd married firstly, before 1568, when she was living, Marion, 3rd daughter (not to be confused with Margaret, 8th daughter who married Sir John Wallace) of Sir Matthew Campbell, of Loudoun, by Isabel, daughter of John Drummond of Innerpeffray. He married secondly to Jane daughter of William Stockdale. He married, lastly, to Elizabeth Wallace, who survived him. (Note: Cokayne cites Scots Peerage vol. 5, p. 165, where it is stated that Jane Stockdale, as wife of a Lord Boyd, must have married this one. However Cokayne notes that as Jane was the youngest of the 18 children of William Stockdale, of Green Hamerton, county York, being 5th daughter by his 2nd wife, Dorothy, daughter of Thomas Mill, of county Durham, married (Visit. of York 1660) "ye Lord Boid of Scotland", if she was married to this Lord Boyd it can only have been as his 2nd wife, and the fact that her eldest brother was not born before 1593, it makes it in the opinion of Cokayne almost incredible (Cokayne 1912, p. 262).)

His children included:

- Robert, Master of Boyd, (died 1597), who married Jean Kerr, a daughter of Mark Kerr, 1st Earl of Lothian. His children included Robert Boyd, 7th Lord Boyd and James Boyd, 9th Lord Boyd.
- Thomas Boyd of Bedlay
- Andrew Boyd, who was made bishop of Argyll in 1632.
- Marion Boyd, who married James Hamilton, 1st Earl of Abercorn (died 1632). She may have been the "Mistress of Paisley" attending Anne of Denmark at Stirling Castle with Margaret Seton, Lady Paisley in April 1603.
- Isabel Boyd, who married (1) John Blair younger of that ilk, (2) Dougal Campbell of Auchinbreck. Francis Hamilton the heir of Provan Hall had been contracted to marry her in 1607, and would later accuse her of witchcraft.
- Agnes Boyd, who married George Elphinstone of Blythswood, Provost of Glasgow in August 1600. As a wedding gift James VI of Scotland gave her a gold chain necklace and a gold belt set with pearls, and a pair of matching gold "garnishings" set with pearl to wear in her hair, worth £580 Scots. After spending a weekend in Glasgow with the newly weds at the end of August, James VI gave George Elphinstone land in the New Park of Partick to build a better house to entertain him in the next time.

== Notes ==
Footnotes

Citations

Peerage of Scotland
Preceded by Robert Boyd	Lord Boyd; 1590–1611	Succeeded by Robert Boyd
