= James Boyd =

James or Jim Boyd may refer to:

== Academia ==
- James Boyd (schoolmaster) (1795–1856), Scottish schoolmaster and author
- James E. Boyd (scientist) (1906–1998), American scientist and academician; director of the Georgia Tech Research Institute
- James Dixon Boyd (1907–1968), Irish-American professor of anatomy
- James I. C. Boyd (1921–2009), British author and narrow gauge railway historian
- James Boyd (engineer) (1904–1987), American mining engineer and educator

== Arts and entertainment ==
- James Boyd (novelist) (1888–1944), American novelist
- Jim Boyd (actor) (1933–2013), American actor who appeared on the 1971 iteration of The Electric Company
- Jimmy Boyd (1939–2009), American singer
- Jim Boyd (newscaster) (1942–2026), American news anchor and reporter
- Jim Boyd (musician) (1956–2016), American musician from the Colville Indian Reservation

== Politics and law ==
- James H. Boyd (mayor) (1809–1877), American politician, mayor of Jackson, Mississippi
- James P. Boyd (1826–1890), Canadian businessman and political figure
- James E. Boyd (politician) (1834–1906), American politician, governor of Nebraska
- James Edmund Boyd (1845–1935), U.S. federal judge
- James Boyd (Australian politician) (1867–1941), member of the Australian House of Representatives
- James H. Boyd (Atlantic City politician) (1906–1974), Atlantic City politician and crime and political boss
- Jimmy Boyd (Louisiana politician) (1910–1974), member of the Louisiana House of Representatives
- Jim Boyd (politician) (born 1956), American politician in the Florida Senate

== Sports ==
- James Boyd (sportsman) (1891–1930), Scottish cricketer, rugby union international and Royal Navy officer
- Jimmy Boyd (footballer) (1907–1991), Scottish footballer
- Jimmy Boyd (baseball) (1918–1965), American Negro league baseball player
- Jim Boyd (boxer) (1930–1997), American boxer
- Jim Boyd (ice hockey) (born 1949), Canadian ice hockey player
- Jim Boyd (racing driver) (1920–2006), American racing driver
- Jim Boyd (New Zealand racing driver), New Zealand racing driver in the 1967 Tasman Series
- James Boyd (American football) (born 1977), American football player

== Others ==
- James Boyd, 2nd Lord Boyd (c. 1469–1484), Scottish peer
- James Boyd, 9th Lord Boyd (died 1654), Scottish noble
- James William Boyd (1822–?), American military officer; supposed double of John Wilkes Booth
- James Harbottle Boyd (1858–1915), Hawaiian colonel
- James Boyd of Trochrig (c. 1530–1581), Scottish clergyman
- James Matthew Boyd (1975–2014), American man fatally shot by police in James Boyd shooting

== Other uses ==
- James H. Boyd Intermediate School, primary school in Huntington, New York
