= L. M. Boyd =

US newspaper columnist (1927-2007)

Louis Malcolm (Mal) Boyd, popularly known as L. M. Boyd (June 9, 1927 in Spokane, Washington, USA – January 22, 2007, in Seattle) was a newspaper columnist whose nationally syndicated column was a collection of miscellaneous trivial and amusing facts.

Boyd was raised in Chimacum and Bremerton, Washington. He joined the Army at the age of 16 and worked for the Stars and Stripes.

After having worked at the (Spokane) Spokesman-Review, the New York Post, the San Francisco Chronicle and San Francisco Examiner, and the Houston Chronicle, in 1963 he moved to the Seattle Post-Intelligencer, where he began his trivia column.

The column ran locally under the name Mike Mailway, the name Mailway having been derived from the digits in Boyd's telephone number at the Post-Intelligencer. In 1968 it was picked up by the San Francisco Chronicle, where it was renamed The Grab Bag, the name by which it is most commonly known, though it ran under other titles in other markets. It eventually appeared in nearly 400 newspapers. Grab Bag often featured the occasional asides of "Our Love and War Man," a character that presented items developed by him with his wife, Patricia.

Boyd was "Love" and his wife "War"—although his wife Patricia maintained it was the other way around—he told Chronicle writer Sam Whiting in 2000. To another reporter Boyd said that "sometimes he's the Love part, sometimes [Patricia] is."

The column led to the formation of Crown Syndicate by Boyd and his wife, which went on to offer several other columns and puzzles. The couple met in 1960, when Mr. Boyd was writing a column for the Houston Chronicle called Dial Watchem, which fielded reader complaints about broken signs and potholes. He had hired Patricia as an assistant. They were married 45 years and raised her six children.

Boyd also had three children from a previous marriage.

Boyd announced his retirement at the end of 2000, but popular demand brought the column back for a few more years. The final column officially ran on August 7, 2004, when Boyd was 77.
