= Michael Boyd =

Michael Boyd or Mike Boyd may refer to:

- Michael Boyd (theatre director) (1955–2023), British theatre director
- Michael T. Boyd, costume designer
- Mike Boyd (basketball) (born 1947), American basketball coach
- Mike Boyd (police officer) (born 1952), Canadian police officer and administrator
