= William Christopher Boyd =

British entomologist (1842–1906)

- Born: 1842; Hackney, London, U.K.
- Died: 18 September 1906 (aged 63–64); Cheshunt, U.K.
- Occupation: Entomologist Numismatist
- Years active: 1867–1904

William Christopher Boyd (1842–18 September 1906) was a British entomologist and numismatist.

== Biography ==
Boyd was born in 1842 and baptised on 16 February at St John's Church, Hackney. Boyd's parents were Christopher Boyd, a gentleman and Mary Ann Harriet Boyd (née Galliver), who had married at St John's Church, Hackney on 26 April 1838.

Boyd was privately educated, and began working when comparatively young.

Boyd's regular employment was as a partner in his family's business, the Manchester Drapers and Warehousemen firm J.C. Boyd and Company, who had a base at 7 Friday Street, London. Boyd was a liveryman of the Draper's Company and served as Master of the Company in 1898.

Boyd was also a Justice of the Peace for the county of Hertfordshire, and was a Governor of St. Batholomew's Hospital, London.

Boyd married Fanny Wales on 9 August 1878 at Holy Trinity, Waltham Cross and the couple went on to have four children.

Boyd was a keen sportsman, enjoying shooting and cricket.

Boyd was interested in archaeology and ethnography, and he collected Neolithic and Paleolithic implements as well as ethnographic material. As of 2005, the survival status of Boyd's archaeological and ethnographic collections was not known.

Boyd died at his home, a house named "The Grange" in Cheshunt, Hertfordshire on 18 September 1906.

== Entomology ==
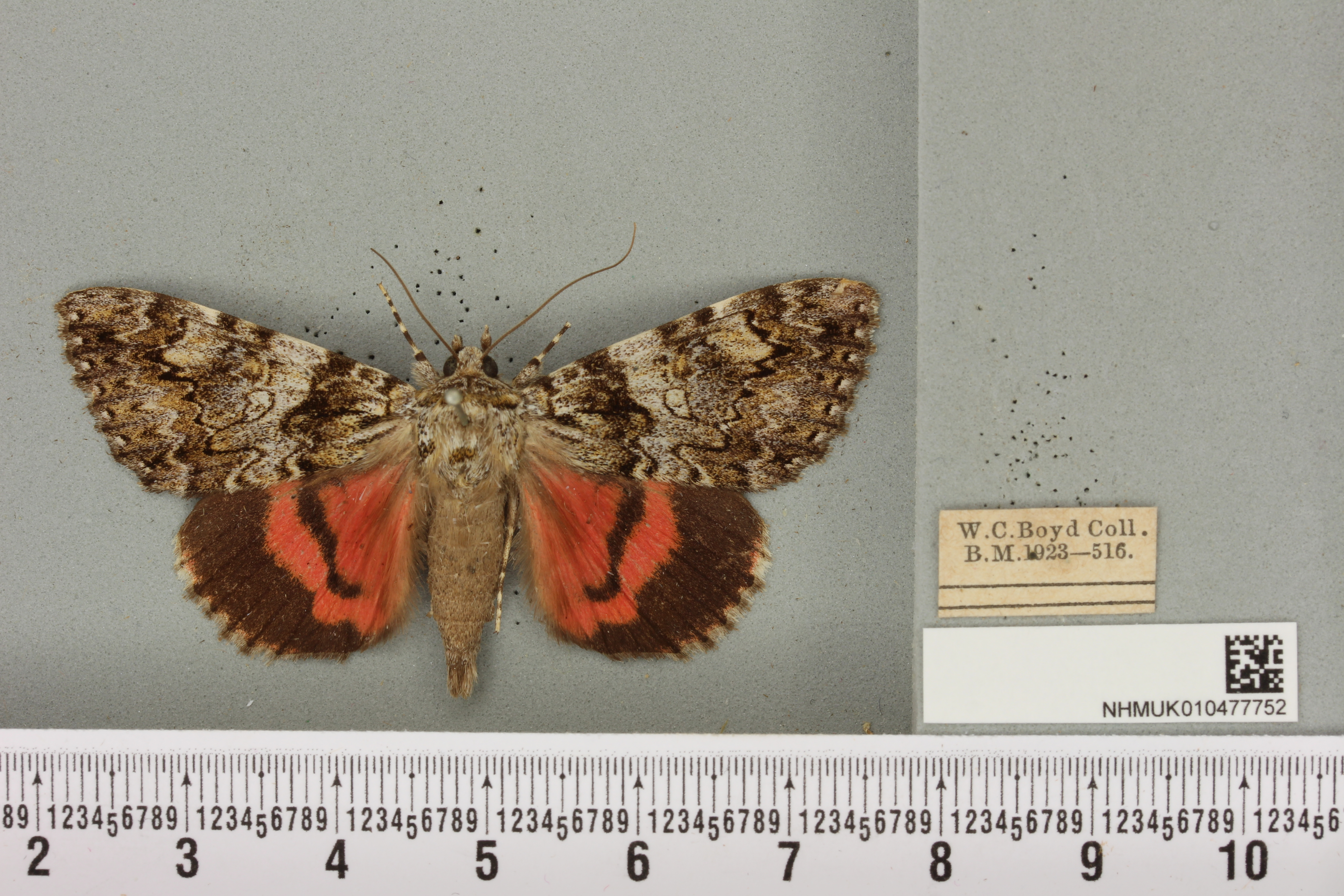
a specimen of the moth species Catocala promissa (Denis & Schiffermüller, 1775), once part of William Christopher Boyd's Collection

Boyd's principal studies concerned Lepidoptera, most particularly moths including Tineidae, but he also worked on Neuroptera in the later part of his life.

Boyd was elected a Member of The Entomological Society of London in December 1867. Boyd regularly exhibited specimens at Entomological Society meetings (for example in May 1874, October 1885, and December 1888) and he published short notices occasionally in the Entomologist's Monthly Magazine from 1868 until 1904.

Boyd's collection of 445 butterflies, 12,500 moths and 800 Trichoptera specimens were presented to the Natural History Museum, London in 1923 by his widow. Boyd's notebooks dating from 1859 to 1889 are held in the archives of the Natural History Museum, London.

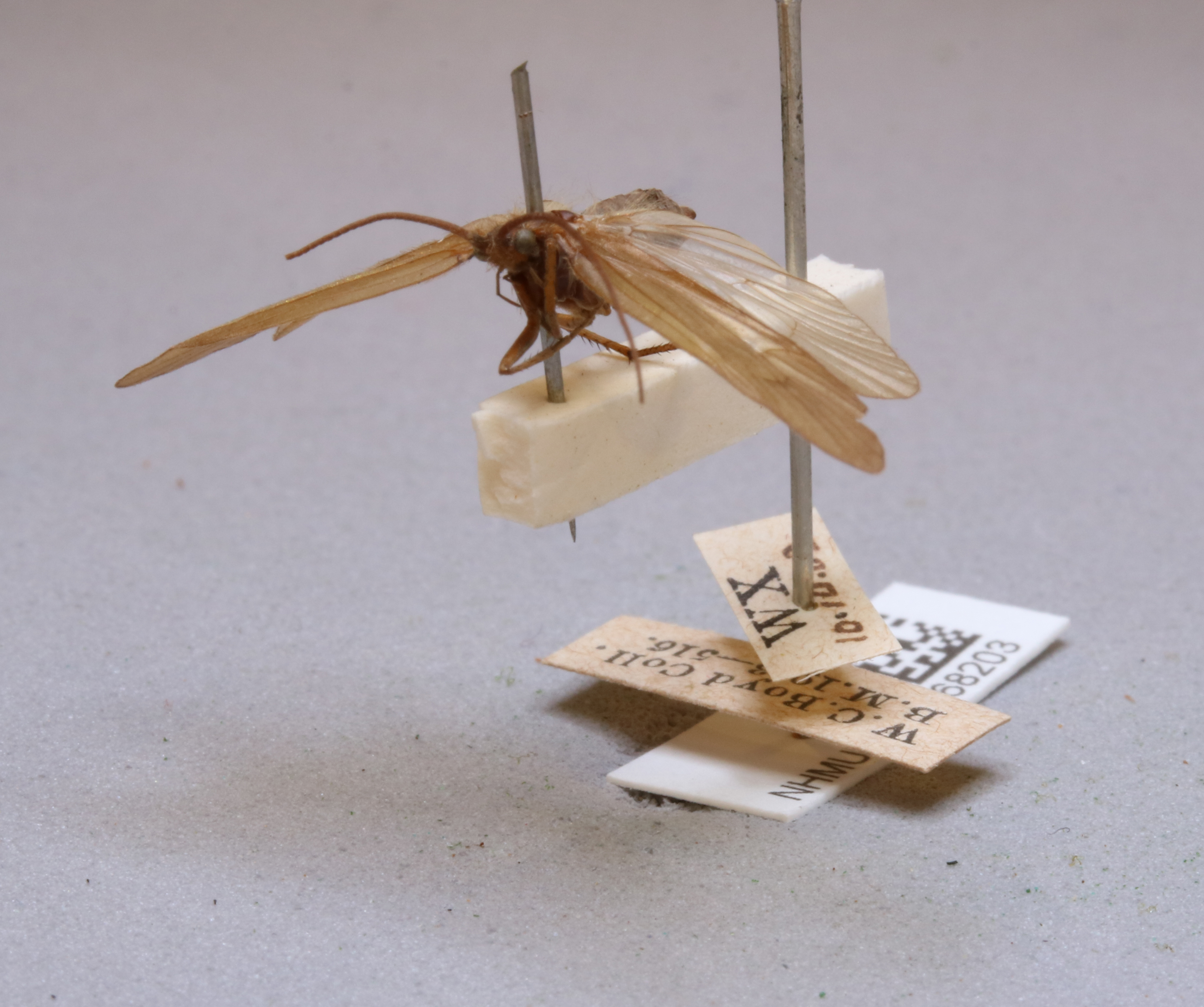
a specimen of the caddisfly species Anabolia nervosa (Curtis, 1834) collected at Waltham Cross ("WX") on 10 October 1903, originally from W.C. Boyd's collection (NHMUK014568203)

== Numismatics ==
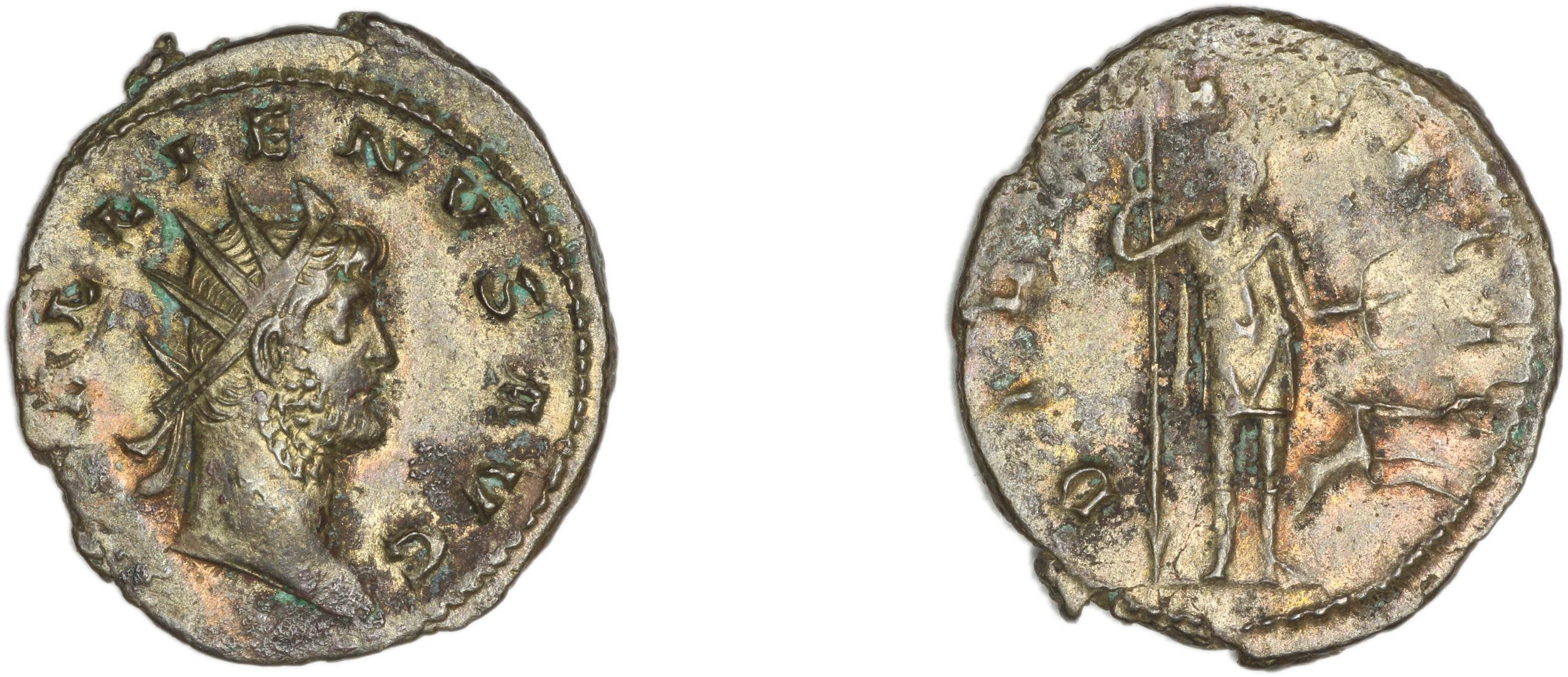
a copper alloy coin of the Roman emperor Gallenius minted at Milan between 253 and 268, donated to the British Museum by William Christopher Boyd in 1902 (BM 1902,1205.8)

Boyd's interest in coins was inspired by a collection he had inherited from George Henry Galliver, his maternal uncle. Boyd joined the Numismatic Society in 1892 and was Honorary Treasurer from 1902 until his death. He was described as having excellent powers of observation for examining coins and identifying those which were rare or unpublished varieties. In 1897 Boyd came into the possession of a hoard of 193 Roman Denarii which had been found near Cambridge and he published a detailed account of the find and how it compared to a similar hoard found at Brickendonbury (a country estate near Hertford, Hertfordshire) in 1895.

During his lifetime between 1893 and 1903 Boyd donated 36 ancient coins to the British Museum. Boyd's personal coin and medal collection remained with his relatives until 2005, when it was offered for sale by the numismatic auctioneers A.H. Baldwin and Sons.
