= Joseph Boyd =

Joseph Boyd may refer to:

- Joseph Boyd (sailor), U.S. Navy sailor
- Joseph Boyd (politician) (1835–1925), blacksmith and political figure in Newfoundland
- Joseph A. Boyd Jr. (1916–2007), politician and jurist in Florida
- Joseph C. Boyd (1760–1823), American soldier and politician
- Joe Boyd (born 1942), American record producer and writer
- Joe Boyd (American football) (1917–1997), American football player and evangelist
