= S. Gregory Boyd =

American lawyer and academic

S. Gregory Boyd, also known as Greg Boyd, is an American author, attorney, and professor specializing in intellectual property, the game industry, and high technology media. He is currently a partner and the chairman of the Interactive Entertainment Group at Frankfurt Kurnit Klein & Selz PC and an adjunct professor for the New York Law School. He also sits on the Board of Advisors for MobyGames.

Mr. Boyd is co-author (with Sean. F. Kane and Brian Pyne) of Video Game Law: Everything You Need To Know About Legal and Business Issues in the Game Industry (Taylor & Francis/CRC Press, Fall 2018), his second book-length discussion of the industry. He is also co-editor and co-author (with game developer Brian Green) of Business & Legal Primer for Game Development (2007).

== Education ==
Boyd received his B.S. in Biochemistry/Philosophy and M.S. in Molecular Biology/Biotechnology from East Carolina University, and both his M.D. and J.D. from the schools of medicine and law at the University of North Carolina at Chapel Hill. He has also graduated from the NYU Stern MBA program.

== Professional life ==
Boyd is the author of several academic and industry-specific publications on subjects ranging from money laundering in virtual currencies to organ donation. He was also an editor for the International Game Developer's Association's first industry publication on intellectual property.

He has been interviewed on business and legal topics by publications including Fortune, Forbes, and IP Law and Business. He has spoken at legal and business conferences including the American Intellectual Property Law Association, Licensing Executives Society, Game Developers Conference, Austin Game Conference, and State of Play. He has also been an invited speaker on business and intellectual property matters at Harvard Business School, MIT, Columbia Law School, and other institutions.

== Works ==
- (2007) with Brian Green. Business & Legal Primer for Game Development. Thomson/Charles River Media. ISBN 1-58450-492-7
