= Diane K. Boyd =

American wildlife biologist

Diane K. Boyd (born 1956) is an American wildlife biologist known for her work on gray wolf (Canis lupus) recovery and ecology, particularly in the Rocky Mountains of the United States.

== Studies and research career ==
Boyd began her fieldwork in 1977 with L. David Mech’s wolf research project in Minnesota. In 1979, she moved to Montana to study the natural recolonization of wolves in the northern Rockies. She received her M.S. and Ph.D. in Wildlife Biology from the University of Montana.

Her research has focused on wolf dispersal, habitat use, genetics, and behavior. She has contributed to wolf recovery studies in the U.S., Canada, and Europe. Her fieldwork also includes studying the hybrid gene pool between wolves and coyotes. Part of this study consisted of results where coyote DNA haplotypes were found in wolf populations, but wolf DNA haplotypes were not found in coyote populations.

Boyd has authored over 50 publications on carnivore biology and management. In 2024, she published a memoir, A Woman Among Wolves: My Forty Year Journey Through Wolf Recovery, reflecting on her career and fieldwork.

== Personal life ==
Boyd lives in Kalispell, Montana, and owns a cabin near Glacier National Park. Boyd took interest in wolves due to their presence in Minnesota, where she grew up. Additionally, she is intrigued by their intelligence, beauty, and similarities to humans.
