= Walter Boyd (Mississippi politician) =

Mississippi state legislator

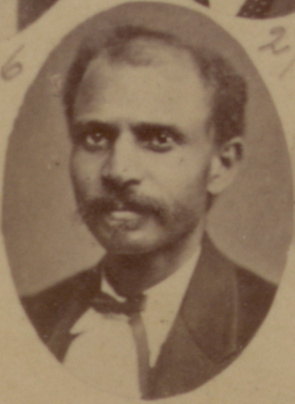

Member of the Mississippi House of Representatives
- In office 1874–1875

Personal details
- Profession: Politician

Walter Boyd was a state legislator in Mississippi. He represented Yazoo County, Mississippi in the Mississippi House of Representatives in 1874 and 1875. J. G. Patterson was the other representative in the House from Yazoo County. In 1875, Julius Allen wrote about a meeting with Boyd in Yazoo City and the armed whites making threats against Republicans and potential African American voters.

== See also ==
- African American officeholders from the end of the Civil War until before 1900
