= Del Rubio Triplets =

American triplet singing trio

The Del Rubio Triplets
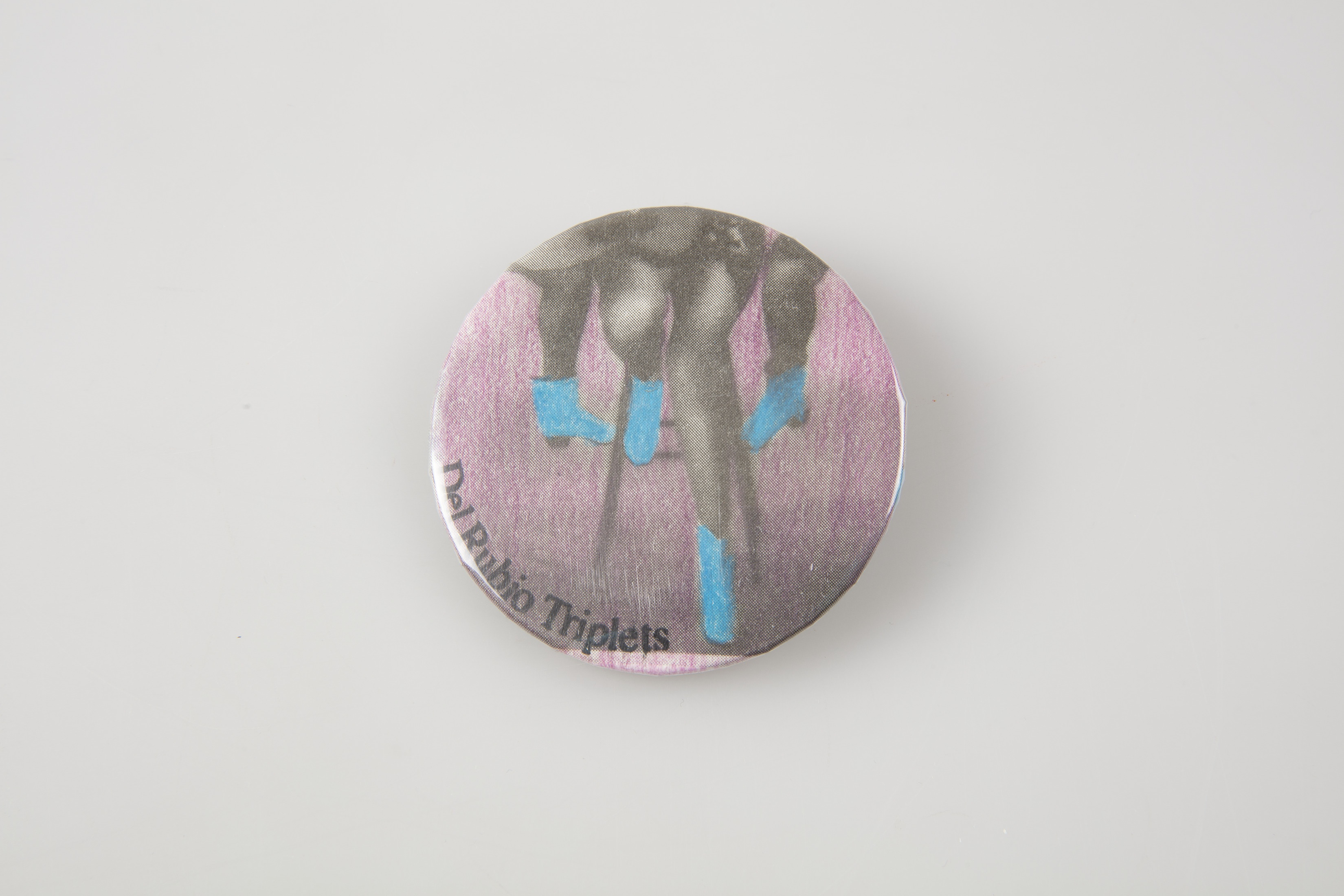
- Pink and Blue Promotional Button for the Band Del Rubio Triplets

Background information
- Also known as: The Boyd Triplets
- Origin: Los Angeles, California, U.S.
- Genres: Folk; acoustic; cover
- Occupation: Singers
- Instruments: Vocals; guitar
- Years active: 1949–1996
- Labels: Karma; Del Rubio
- Members: Edith ("Eadie"), Elena and Milly
- Eadie Del Rubio
- Birth Name: Edith Bolling Boyd
- Died: 16 December 1996 (aged 75); Torrance, California, U.S.
- Elena Del Rubio
- Birth name: Elena Rolfe Boyd
- Died: 21 March 2001 (aged 79); Los Angeles, California, U.S.
- Milly Del Rubio
- Birth name: Mildred Stuart Boyd
- Died: 21 July 2011 (aged 89); Los Angeles, California, U.S.

The Del Rubio Triplets (born 23 August 1921) were an American sister trio who were a folk/acoustic cover group who rose to fame in the 1980s due mostly to their campy style of dress and their cover versions of songs. They earlier performed from the 1940s through the 1960s as The Boyd Triplets as singers in Xavier Cugat's band, in night clubs, and in at least one feature film.

== Biography ==
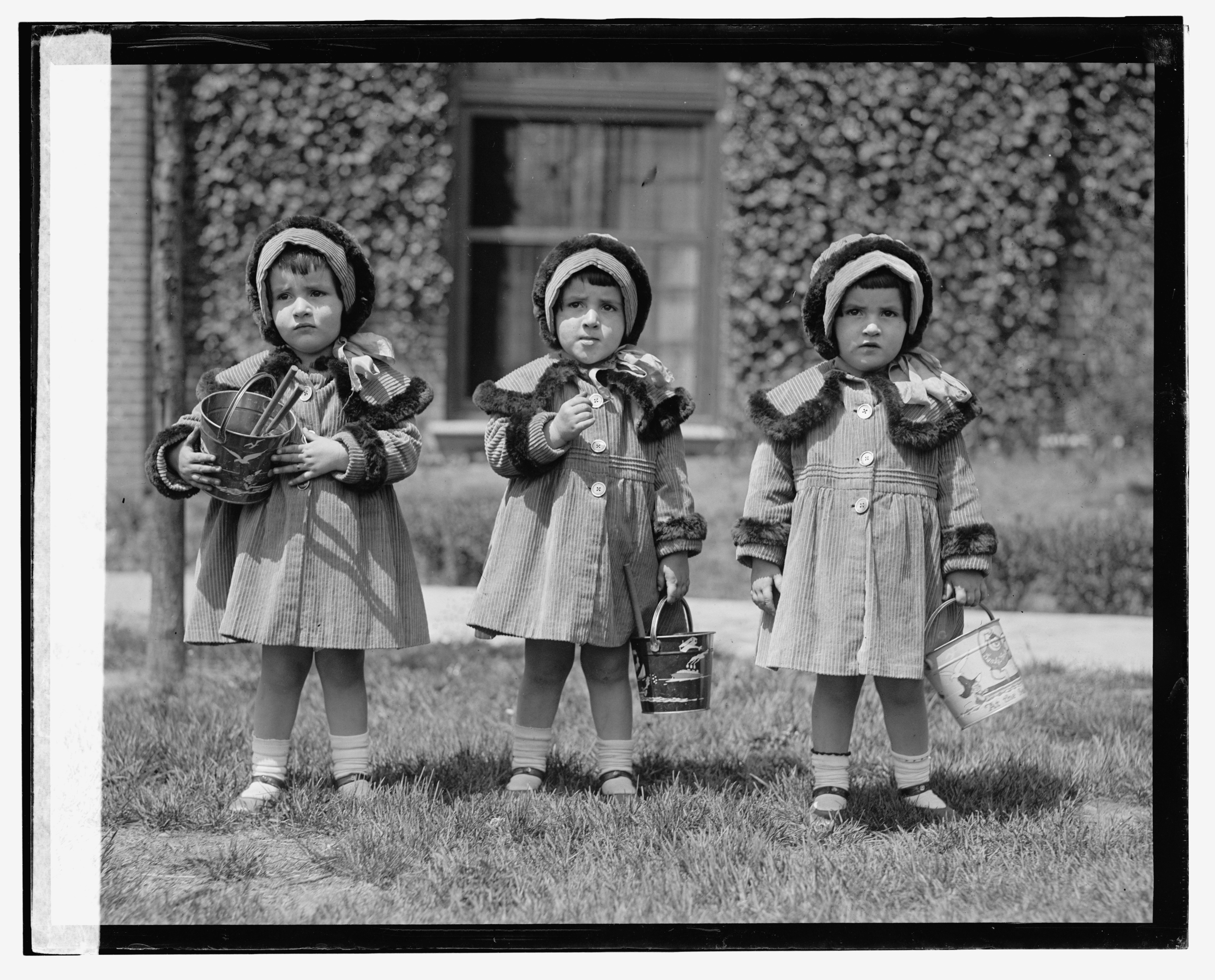
J.E. Boyd triplets, 5-3-24 LOC npcc.11281

The Del Rubio Triplets were born as Edith ("Eadie"), Elena, and Mildred Boyd on August 23, 1921, in the Panama Canal Zone. They were of Scottish, English, and Spanish descent, and were also direct descendants of Pocahontas through the Bolling family lineage. Their grandfather was Rolfe Emerson Bolling, and their great aunt was Edith Bolling Galt Wilson, the wife of United States President Woodrow Wilson. The girls grew up in the Panama Canal Zone and Washington, D.C. They had one older sister, Lola Boyd, who died in 1992.

As the Boyd Triplets, they appeared in the musical, "The Duchess Misbehaves," a play by A.P. Waxman, that premiered in 1946 at the Adelphi Theater in New York City.

Their stage name comes from the color they dyed their hair; the word "rubio" means "blonde" in Spanish. The girls never got married or had children because they didn't want to break up their act. They came up with their stage name The Del Rubio Triplets after their mother died from a stroke in 1965. The triplets were Catholic.

They first achieved fame in the U.S. in the 1950s, when they were popular night club performers, appearing often on television, including several Bob Hope programs on NBC. They appeared on Good Morning America and Late Night with David Letterman.

Grammy-winning songwriter Allee Willis is credited with re-discovering the Del Rubio Triplets in 1985 and presenting them at her parties where they garnered much notable attention. Their biggest hits were cover versions of "Whip It" by Devo, "Neutron Dance" by The Pointer Sisters, "Ding-Dong! The Witch Is Dead" from The Wizard of Oz, "Walk Like an Egyptian" by The Bangles, "These Boots Are Made for Walkin'" by Nancy Sinatra, and "Hey Jude" by The Beatles. They released three albums Three Gals Three Guitars, Whip It, and Jingle Bells: Christmas with the Del Rubio Triplets. In 1999 they released their compilation album Del Rubio Triplets Anthology three years after Eadie died.

They made various television appearances such as Married... with Children playing Peg Bundy's cousins, Full House, Mother Goose Rock 'n' Rhyme, The Golden Girls, Night Court, Hangin' With Mr. Cooper, New Monkees, Videolog with Huell Howser on KCET, Square One TV, Ellen, and Pee-wee's Playhouse wearing bouffant hairdos and gaudy blue eye shadow. They often appeared scantily clad (usually showing off their legs) despite the fact that they were in their 60s at the time. They often are remembered for their contribution of "Winter Wonderland" to the Pee-wee's Playhouse Christmas Special that originally aired in 1988. They briefly appeared in the movie Americathon, playing "America the Beautiful" behind several posing bodybuilders. They also appeared in Sliders, season 1 episode 8, "The King Is Back" as themselves, performing "Whip It". In the late 1980s, they were featured in a McDonald's fast food advertisement.

The three performed until Eadie was diagnosed with cancer in 1996; she died that year at Torrance Memorial Medical Center in Torrance, California. After Eadie's death, Elena and Milly never performed again, but lived together until Elena died of cancer in 2001. Milly died from pneumonia on July 21, 2011. All three triplets are interred in a family plot at Holy Cross Cemetery in Culver City, California next to their father.

== Members ==
The Del Rubio Triplets
Name	Eadie Del Rubio	Elena Del Rubio	Milly Del Rubio
Birth name	Edith Bolling Boyd	Elena Rolfe Boyd	Mildred Stuart Boyd
Born	August 23, 1921		
Location	Ancón, Panama Canal Zone		
Died	December 16, 1996 (aged 75)	March 19, 2001 (aged 79)	July 21, 2011 (aged 89)
Location	Torrance, California	Los Angeles, California	
Resting Place	Holy Cross Cemetery, Culver City, California		
Years Active	1949–1996		

== Albums ==
- Three Gals Three Guitars (1988)
- Jingle Belles: Christmas with the Del Rubio Triplets (1991)
- Whip It (1991)

== Compilation albums ==
- Del Rubio Triplets Anthology (1999)
