= George W. Boyd =

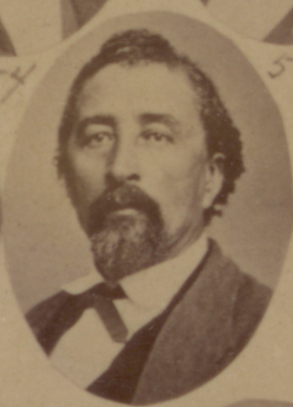

George W. Boyd was an American politician from Mississippi who served on the Warren County board of supervisors and represented the county in the Mississippi House of Representatives in 1874 and 1875.

He was noted after an October 1875 letter describing Democratic Party plans to rig an election.

== See also ==
- African American officeholders from the end of the Civil War until before 1900
