= Billy Boyd (ice hockey) =

Canadian ice hockey player

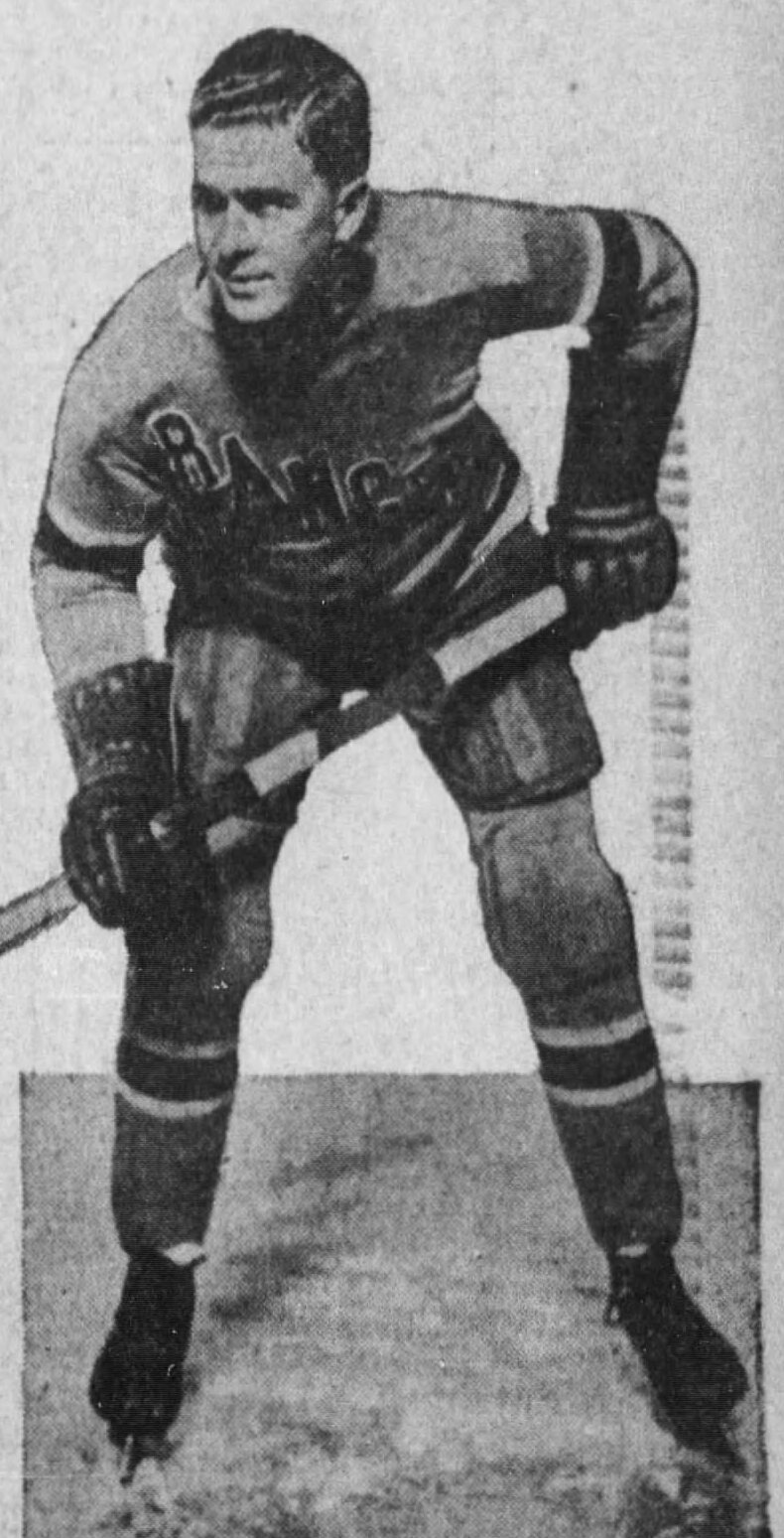
- Born: May 15, 1895 Belleville, Ontario, Canada
- Died: November 16, 1940 (aged 45) Baltimore, Maryland, United States
- Height: 5 ft 10 in (178 cm)
- Weight: 185 lb (84 kg; 13 st 3 lb)
- Position: Right wing
- Shot: Right
- Played for: New York Rangers; New York Americans
- Playing career: 1916–1930

William George Boyd (May 15, 1895 – November 16, 1940) was a Canadian professional ice hockey forward who played 133 games in the National Hockey League with the New York Rangers and New York Americans between 1926 and 1930. With the Rangers he won the Stanley Cup in 1928. Outside of the NHL, Boyd played hockey from 1916 to 1930 in a variety of minor and senior leagues.

Billy Boyd had one son, William Gould.

== Career ==
While growing up, Boyd lived in Hamilton, Ontario. He joined the Hamilton Rowing Club's hockey team in 1915, playing for their junior club and senior club. In Allan Cup competition, Boyd scored two goals in one game for Hamilton. The following season and in 1917–18, Boyd also played for the Hamilton Tigers of the senior OHA. He then served in the military. He returned to the Tigers for the 1919–20 season, then played a season for the Halifax Wanderers of the Halifax City League, before returning to Hamilton for one further season with the Tigers.

In 1922, Boyd moved to the United States, playing one season of hockey for the Milwaukee Athletic Club. The following year, he moved to Minneapolis, Minnesota, where he played three seasons of ice hockey, for the Minneapolis Millers, Minneapolis Rockets and another season with the Millers.

In 1926, Boyd was recruited by Conn Smythe for the new New York Rangers team in the National Hockey League. He played two and a half seasons with the Rangers before being demoted to their Springfield Indians affiliate in the Canadian–American Hockey League. Before the 1929–30 season, the New York Americans claimed him in the intra-league draft. He would play one season with the Americans to end his playing career.

In 1932, Boyd moved to Baltimore, Maryland to coach the Baltimore Orioles minor-league ice hockey team for three seasons. Boyd died in November 1940.

== Career statistics ==
=== Regular season and playoffs ===
			Regular season					Playoffs
Season	Team	League	GP	G	A	Pts	PIM	GP	G	A	Pts	PIM
1916–17	Hamilton Tigers	OHA Sr	—	—	—	—	—	—	—	—	—	—
1917–18	Hamilton Tigers	OHA Sr	5	11	0	11	—	—	—	—	—	—
1919–20	Hamilton Tigers	OHA Sr	6	9	1	10	—	2	0	2	2	—
1920–21	Halifax Wanderers	HCHL	6	6	1	7	16	2	0	0	0	6
1921–22	Hamilton Tigers	OHA Sr	9	8	8	16	—	—	—	—	—	—
1923–24	Minneapolis Millers	USAHA	20	1	0	1	—	—	—	—	—	—
1924–25	Minneapolis Rockets	USAHA	39	4	0	4	—	—	—	—	—	—
1925–26	Minneapolis Millers	CHL	34	11	2	13	30	3	0	0	0	4
1926–27	New York Rangers	NHL	44	4	1	5	42	—	—	—	—	—
1927–28	New York Rangers	NHL	43	4	0	4	11	9	0	0	0	4
1928–29	New York Rangers	NHL	11	0	0	0	5	1	0	0	0	0
1928–29	Springfield Indians	Can-Am	30	3	2	5	16	—	—	—	—	—
1929–30	New York Americans	NHL	44	7	6	13	16	—	—	—	—	—
NHL totals			142	15	7	22	74	10	0	0	0	4
