= Stephen William Boyd =

British academic

Stephen William Boyd is a professor of Tourism at the University of Ulster in Northern Ireland.

== Career ==
Prior to taking this position he was a senior lecturer at Staffordshire University in Stoke-on-Trent, England and at Otago University in Dunedin, New Zealand. He has co-authored the book Heritage Tourism, which appeared as #2 among Top 10 Academic Bestsellers of the Times Higher Education magazine in May 2008.
