= Robert Boyd, 8th Lord Boyd =

Robert Boyd, 8th Lord Boyd (c. 1618 – 17 November 1640), was a Scottish noble and politician.

== Biography ==
Robert Boyd was the only son and heir by second wife of Robert Boyd, 7th Lord Boyd. He was born about 1618. He was made J.P. for Cuningham on 25 November 1634. On 22 February 1638 he was one of the noblemen who ascended the mercat cross in Edinburgh to protest against the proclamation made that day, which contained the royal approbation of the service-book. He subsequently subscribed the National Covenant, when renewed March the following, in the kirkyard of Greyfriars Kirk, and actively co-operated with the Covenanters in their opposition to King Charles. He was present in Parliament 31 August 1639 and 2 June 1640. He died of a fever on 17 November 1640.

== Family ==
Robert Boyd was the only son and heir by second wife of Robert Boyd, 7th Lord Boyd. Although he married Anne, 2nd daughter of John Fleming, 2nd Earl of Wigtown, by Margaret, daughter of Alexander Livingstone, 1st Earl of Linlithgow, they had no sons, and the title passed to his uncle James Boyd, 9th Lord Boyd. His Sister Marion married James Dundas, Lord Arniston.

Peerage of Scotland
Preceded by Robert Boyd	Lord Boyd; 1628–1640	Succeeded by James Boyd
