= Robert Boyd, 7th Lord Boyd =

Scottish noble (1595–1628)

The Right Honourable The Lord Boyd

Personal details
- Born: Robert Boyd; November 1595
- Died: 28 August 1628 (aged 32)
- Spouses: Margaret Montgomerie, Countess of Eglintoun (m. 1614; died 1616) Christian Lindsay, Lady Lindsay (m. 1617)
- Relations: James Boyd, 9th Lord Boyd (brother)
- Children: Christian Scott, Lady Harden; Isabel Grierson, Lady Lag; Robert Boyd, 8th Lord Boyd; Marion Dundas, Lady Arniston
- Parent(s): Jean Kerr; Robert Boyd
- Education: University of Saumur

Robert Boyd, 7th Lord Boyd (November 1595 – 28 August 1628), was a Scottish noble.

== Early life ==
Robert Boyd was born in November 1595. He was the son of Jean (née Kerr) Boyd and Robert Boyd, Master of Boyd, who died v.p. in May 1597 (the son and heir apparent of Thomas Boyd, 6th Lord Boyd). After the death of his father, his mother married David Lindsay, 12th Earl of Crawford. They later divorced and she married Thomas Hamilton, of Robertoun. His maternal grandparents were Mark Kerr, 1st Earl of Lothian, and Margaret Maxwell (a daughter of John Maxwell, Lord Herries).

Boyd was educated at the University of Saumur.

== Career ==
In June 1611 he inherited the title of Lord Boyd on the death of his grandfather Thomas Boyd, 6th Lord Boyd. (Note: Cokayne 1912, p. 262)

== Personal life ==
Lord Boyd was twice married. His first marriage was in c. 1614 to Margaret Montgomerie, Countess of Eglintoun, the widow of Hugh Montgomerie, Earl of Eglintoun. She was the eldest daughter, and, heir of Hon. Robert Montgomerie of Giffen and Jean Campbell (eldest daughter of Sir Matthew Campbell, of Loudoun). (Note: Julian dates with 1 January as the start of year (See Old Style and New Style dates)) Margaret was living as his wife as of 4 March 1616, but died s.p., in 1616.

Lord Boyd married, secondly, Lady Christian Lindsay (née Hamilton), widow of Robert Lindsay, 9th Lord Lindsay, on 9 December 1617. Lady Christian was the eldest daughter of Thomas Hamilton, 1st Earl of Haddington and Margaret Borthwick (a daughter of James Borthwick, of Newbyres). Together they were the parents of:

- Isabel Boyd, who married John Sinclair of Stevenson, a younger son of Sir John Sinclair, 1st Baronet, of Stevenson, in 1638. After his death she married Sir John Grierson of Lag, son of Sir Robert Grierson of Lag, in 1646.
- Christian Boyd, who married Sir William Scott of Harden, a grandson of Walter Scott of Harden, in 1641.
- Jean Boyd, who married Sir Alexander Morison.
- Robert Boyd, 8th Lord Boyd (c. 1618–1640), who married Lady Anne Fleming, daughter of John Fleming, 2nd Earl of Wigtown, in 1639.
- Marion Boyd (1624–1661), who married Sir James Dundas, Lord Arniston, in 1641.

He died on 28 August 1628, aged 33. Boyd's will was dated 17 October 1623, probated 7 May 1632. His widow, an ardent Presbyterian, born between 1588 and 1594, died "very comfortably" at the house of her daughter Lady Scott, of Ardross, in the parish of Elie, shortly before 22 January 1646 and was buried on 6 February.

== Notes ==
Peerage of Scotland
Preceded by Thomas Boyd	Lord Boyd; 1611–1628	Succeeded by Robert Boyd
