= James Boyd, 9th Lord Boyd =

- Born: 1597; Kilmarnock, Scotland
- Died: March 1654 (aged 56–57); Ayrshire, Scotland
- Occupation: Scottish noble
- Known for: adhering to the Royalist cause during the Wars of the Three Kingdoms

James Boyd, 9th Lord Boyd (1597–1654), was a Scottish noble who adhered to the Royalist cause during the Wars of the Three Kingdoms.

== Biography ==
James Boyd was the younger brother of Robert Boyd, 7th Lord Boyd and inherited the title in 1641 on the death of his nephew Robert Boyd, 8th Lord Boyd.

James Boyd was a steadfast Royalist, joined the Association at Cumbernauld in favour of Charles I in January 1641, he was one of the Committee of War for the South 16 April 1644, and for Ayr 24 July 1644, and 18 April 1648.

He was included in the list of the nobility to be summoned to the Committee of Estates, in Cromwell's letter to Lieutenant-General David Leslie 17 January 1650, and was fined £1,500 under the Cromwell's Act of Grace on 12 April 1654, a sum afterwards, 9 March 1655, reduced to £500. His steady support of the royal cause appears to have financially embarrassed him, as he was obliged to wadset several portions of his estate to Sir William Cochrane of Cowdoun.

Lord James is said to have paid great attention to the trade of Kilmarnock, and to have established a school in the town for "the educatioune and learning off zoung ones"[sic]. His will was confirmed at Edinburgh 23 October 1655, and he appears to have died in March 1654.

== Family ==
Lord James married, prior to 1640, a woman named Catherine, the second daughter and co-heir of John Crayke of the city of York, the eldest, but disinherited, son of Ralph Crayke of Marton, Yorkshire. She was baptized at Bridlington on 3 January 1619. In commemoration of this marriage the words "James Boyd and Catherine Craik", with the family arms, were sculptured on one of the towers of Dean Castle, the family seat at Kilmarnock. They had issue:

1. William, Master of Boyd, afterwards first Earl of Kilmarnock, heir and successor.
2. Eva, both styled daughters lawful to the deceased James, Lord Boyd, 24 March 1659.
3. Jean, married David Cunningham, 1st Baronet of Robertland. She died 8 May 1665.
4. Margaret

== Notes ==
Peerage of Scotland
Preceded by Robert Boyd	Lord Boyd; 1640–1654	Succeeded by William Boyd
