= List of NHL players (L) =

This is a list of National Hockey League (NHL) players who have played at least one game in the NHL from 1917 to present and have a last name that starts with "L".

List updated as of the 2018–19 NHL season.

== L'–La ==
- Moe L'Abbe
- Joel L'Esperance
- Teemu Laakso
- Antti Laaksonen
- Mike Labadie
- Kevin Labanc
- Jason LaBarbera
- Joseph LaBate
- Neil LaBatte
- Jean-Francois Labbe
- Marc LaBelle
- Samuel Laberge
- Leo Labine
- Gord Labossiere
- Max Labovitch
- Dan Labraaten
- Yvon Labre
- Patrick Labrecque
- Guy Labrie
- Pierre-Cedric Labrie
- Elmer Lach
- Michel Lachance
- Scott Lachance
- Blaine Lacher
- Eddie Lack
- Francois Lacombe
- Jackson LaCombe
- Normand Lacombe
- Dan LaCosta
- Dan LaCouture
- Alphonse Lacroix
- Andre Lacroix
- Daniel Lacroix
- Eric Lacroix
- Pierre Lacroix
- Tanner Laczynski
- Andrew Ladd
- Randy Ladouceur
- Paul LaDue
- Nathan LaFayette
- Alex Laferriere
- Rick LaFerriere
- Sam Lafferty
- Christian Laflamme
- Guy Lafleur
- Rene Lafleur
- Jack LaFontaine
- Pat LaFontaine
- Ernie Laforce
- Bob LaForest
- Mark Laforest
- Claude LaForge
- Marc Laforge
- Pete Laframboise
- Adelard Lafrance
- Leo Lafrance
- Alexis Lafreniere
- Jason Lafreniere
- Roger Lafreniere
- Jean-Guy Lagace
- Maxim Lagace
- William Lagesson
- Brooks Laich
- Tom Laidlaw
- Kellan Lain
- Patrik Laine
- Quintin Laing
- Rob Laird
- Serge Lajeunesse
- Simon Lajeunesse
- Maxime Lajoie
- Sasha Lakovic
- Hec Lalande
- David Laliberte
- Patrick Lalime
- Bobby Lalonde
- Edward "Newsy" Lalonde
- Ron Lalonde
- Shawn Lalonde
- Mike Lalor
- Joe Lamb
- Mark Lamb
- Brad Lambert
- Dan Lambert
- Denny Lambert
- Lane Lambert
- Yvon Lambert
- Dick Lamby
- Jean Lamirande
- Hank Lammens
- Juho Lammikko
- Marc Lamothe
- Leo Lamoureux
- Mitch Lamoureux
- Bryce Lampman
- Mike Lampman
- Jack Lancien
- Anton Lander
- Gabriel Landeskog
- Larry Landon
- Eric Landry
- Gord Lane
- Myles Lane
- Robert Lang
- Darren Langdon
- Steve Langdon
- Pete Langelle
- Jamie Langenbrunner
- Chris Langevin
- Dave Langevin
- Josh Langfeld
- Marek Langhamer
- Daymond Langkow
- Scott Langkow
- Alain Langlais
- Al Langlois
- Charlie Langlois
- Rod Langway
- Jeff Lank
- Kevin Lankinen
- Jean-Marc Lanthier
- Ted Lanyon
- Rick Lanz
- Daniel Laperriere
- Ian Laperriere
- Jacques Laperriere
- Hendrix Lapierre
- Maxim Lapierre
- Darryl Laplante
- Claude Lapointe
- Guy Lapointe
- Martin Lapointe
- Rick Lapointe
- Nick Lappin
- Peter Lappin
- Edgar Laprade
- Ben "Bun" LaPrairie
- Georges Laraque
- Igor Larionov
- Garry Lariviere
- Dylan Larkin
- Drew Larman
- Jeff Larmer
- Steve Larmer
- Wildor Larochelle
- Denis Larocque
- Mario Larocque
- Michel "Bunny" Larocque
- Michel Larocque
- Chad LaRose
- Charles "Bonner" Larose
- Claude Larose (born 1942)
- Claude Larose (born 1955)
- Cory Larose
- Guy Larose
- Pierre Larouche
- Steve Larouche
- Brad Larsen
- Philip Larsen
- Norm Larson
- Reed Larson
- Adam Larsson
- Jacob Larsson
- Johan Larsson
- Tyler Larter
- Jan Lasak
- Brian Lashoff
- Matt Lashoff
- Gary Laskoski
- Jiri Latal
- Guillaume Latendresse
- James Latos
- Phil Latreille
- David Latta
- Michael Latta
- Marty Lauder
- Michael Lauen
- Brad Lauer
- Craig Laughlin
- Mike Laughton
- Scott Laughton
- Janne Laukkanen
- Jakub Lauko
- Don "Red" Laurence
- Oliver Lauridsen
- Paul Laus
- Jeremy Lauzon
- Kevin LaVallee
- Mark LaVarre
- Brian Lavender
- Eric Lavigne
- Peter Laviolette
- Jack Laviolette
- Dominic Lavoie
- Raphael Lavoie
- Kirby Law
- Paul Lawless
- Mark Lawrence
- Danny Lawson
- Brian Lawton
- Derek Laxdal
- Gordon Laxton
- Hal Laycoe
- Curtis Lazar
- Jeff Lazaro

== Le ==
- Jamie Leach
- Jay Leach
- Larry Leach
- Reggie Leach
- Steve Leach
- Pat Leahy
- Brett Leason
- Jim Leavins
- Brett Lebda
- Patrick Lebeau
- Stephan Lebeau
- Drew LeBlanc
- Fern LeBlanc
- Jean-Paul LeBlanc
- John LeBlanc
- Louis Leblanc
- Peter LeBlanc
- Ray LeBlanc
- Peter Leboutillier
- Al LeBrun
- Bill LeCaine
- Vincent Lecavalier
- Jack LeClair
- John LeClair
- Pascal Leclaire
- Mike Leclerc
- Rene LeClerc
- Doug Lecuyer
- Nick Leddy
- Per Ledin
- Walt Ledingham
- Albert "Battleship" Leduc
- Rich LeDuc
- Grant Ledyard
- Anders Lee
- Brian Lee
- Ed Lee
- Peter Lee
- Brad Leeb
- Greg Leeb
- Gary Leeman
- Brian Leetch
- Guillaume Lefebvre
- Patrice Lefebvre
- Sylvain Lefebvre
- Bryan Lefley
- Chuck Lefley
- Manny Legace
- Roger Leger
- Barry Legge
- Randy Legge
- Claude Legris
- David Legwand
- Artturi Lehkonen
- Hugh Lehman
- Scott Lehman
- Tommy Lehmann
- Robin Lehner
- Yanick Lehoux
- Jori Lehtera
- Jere Lehtinen
- Petteri Lehto
- Antero Lehtonen
- Kari Lehtonen
- Mikko Lehtonen (born 1978)
- Mikko Lehtonen (born 1987)
- Mikko Lehtonen (born 1994)
- Hank Lehvonen
- Edward Leier
- Taylor Leier
- Michael Leighton
- Ville Leino
- Mikko Leinonen
- Brendan Leipsic
- Bob Leiter
- Ken Leiter
- Josh Leivo
- Jacques Lemaire
- Moe Lemay
- Reggie Lemelin
- Roger Lemelin
- Alain Lemieux
- Bob Lemieux
- Brendan Lemieux
- Claude Lemieux
- Jacques Lemieux
- Jean Lemieux
- Jocelyn Lemieux
- Mario Lemieux
- Real Lemieux
- Richard Lemieux
- Tim Lenardon
- Mike Lenarduzzi
- David LeNeveu
- John Leonard
- Jordan Leopold
- Alfred "Pit" Lepine
- Hector Lepine
- Sami Lepisto
- Brett Lernout
- Francois Leroux
- Gaston Leroux
- Jean-Yves Leroux
- Curtis Leschyshyn
- Jake Leschyshyn
- Art Lesieur
- Otto Leskinen
- Francis Lessard
- Junior Lessard
- Mario Lessard
- Rick Lessard
- Lucas Lessio
- Bill Lesuk
- Jack Leswick
- Pete Leswick
- Tony Leswick
- Alan Letang
- Kris Letang
- Mark Letestu
- Pierre-Luc Letourneau-Leblond
- Trevor Letowski
- Vinni Lettieri
- Maxim Letunov
- Joe Levandoski
- Jean-Louis Levasseur
- Normand Leveille
- Guy Leveque
- Don Lever
- Devon Levi
- Craig Levie
- Scott Levins
- Alex Levinsky
- Tapio Levo
- Anton Levtchi
- Danny Lewicki
- Tyler Lewington
- Dale Lewis
- Dave Lewis
- Doug Lewis
- Grant Lewis
- Herbie Lewis
- Trevor Lewis
- Rick Ley

== Li ==
- Mike Liambas
- Igor Liba
- Jeff Libby
- Nick Libett
- Tony Licari
- Bob Liddington
- Doug Lidster
- Nicklas Lidstrom
- Nathan Lieuwen
- David Liffiton
- John-Michael Liles
- Andreas Lilja
- Jakob Lilja
- Timothy Liljegren
- John Lilley
- Juha Lind
- Anders Lindback
- Chris Lindberg
- Oscar Lindberg
- Tobias Lindberg
- Pelle Lindbergh
- Matt Lindblad
- Oskar Lindblom
- Petteri Lindbohm
- Johan Lindbom
- Esa Lindell
- Jamie Linden
- Trevor Linden
- Charlie Lindgren
- Lars Lindgren
- Mats Lindgren
- Perttu Lindgren
- Ryan Lindgren
- Anton Lindholm
- Elias Lindholm
- Hampus Lindholm
- Mikael Lindholm
- Par Lindholm
- Brett Lindros
- Eric Lindros
- Bert Lindsay
- Bill Lindsay
- Ted Lindsay
- Gustav Lindstrom
- Joakim Lindstrom
- Willy Lindstrom
- David Ling
- Charles Linglet
- Ken Linseman
- Richard Lintner
- JC Lipon
- Chris LiPuma
- Carl Liscombe
- Enver Lisin
- Bryan Little
- Neil Little
- David Littman
- Ed Litzenberger
- Mike Liut
- Jake Livingstone
- Blake Lizotte
- Jon Lizotte

== Lo ==
- Lonnie Loach
- Jacques Locas
- Bill Lochead
- Corey Locke
- Ken Lockett
- Howie "Holes" Lockhart
- Norm Locking
- Viktor Lodin
- Darcy Loewen
- Mark Lofthouse
- Bob Logan
- Dave Logan
- Mason Lohrei
- Claude Loiselle
- Martin Lojek
- Andrei Loktionov
- Andrei Lomakin
- Matthew Lombardi
- Ryan Lomberg
- Brian Loney
- Troy Loney
- Barry Long
- Stan Long
- Ross Lonsberry
- Hakan Loob
- Peter Loob
- Viktor Loov
- Pete LoPresti
- Sam LoPresti
- Jim Lorentz
- Steven Lorentz
- Danny Lorenz
- Bob Lorimer
- Matt Lorito
- Rod Lorrain
- Clem Loughlin
- Wilf Loughlin
- Ron Loustel
- Ben Lovejoy
- Ken Lovsin
- Reed Low
- Ron Low
- Dwayne Lowdermilk
- Darren Lowe
- Keegan Lowe
- Kevin Lowe
- Norman "Odie" Lowe
- Ross Lowe
- Eddie Lowrey
- Fred Lowrey
- Gerry Lowrey
- Adam Lowry
- Dave Lowry
- Lynn Loyns
- Larry Lozinski

== Lu–Ly ==
- Dan Lucas
- Dave Lucas
- Jake Lucchini
- Don Luce
- Milan Lucic
- Jan Ludvig
- John Ludvig
- Craig Ludwig
- Steve Ludzik
- Matt Luff
- Warren Luhning
- Bernie Lukowich
- Brad Lukowich
- Morris Lukowich
- Chuck Luksa
- Dave Lumley
- Harry Lumley
- Jyrki Lumme
- Pentti Lund
- Brian Lundberg
- Len Lunde
- Anton Lundell
- Isac Lundestrom
- Bengt Lundholm
- Mike Lundin
- Nils Lundkvist
- Jamie Lundmark
- Henrik Lundqvist
- Joel Lundqvist
- Joe Lundrigan
- Tord Lundstrom
- Pat Lundy
- Tristan Luneau
- Chris Luongo
- Roberto Luongo
- Eetu Luostarinen
- Joona Luoto
- Ross Lupaschuk
- Gilles Lupien
- Gary Lupul
- Joffrey Lupul
- Roman Lyashenko
- Olle Lycksell
- Toni Lydman
- George Lyle
- Jack Lynch
- Vic Lynn
- Alex Lyon
- Steve Lyon
- Ron "Peaches" Lyons
- Brett Lysak
- Tom Lysiak
- Roman Lyubimov
- Ilya Lyubushkin

== See also ==
- hockeydb.com NHL Player List - L
