= Joe Miller (ice hockey) =

Canadian ice hockey player

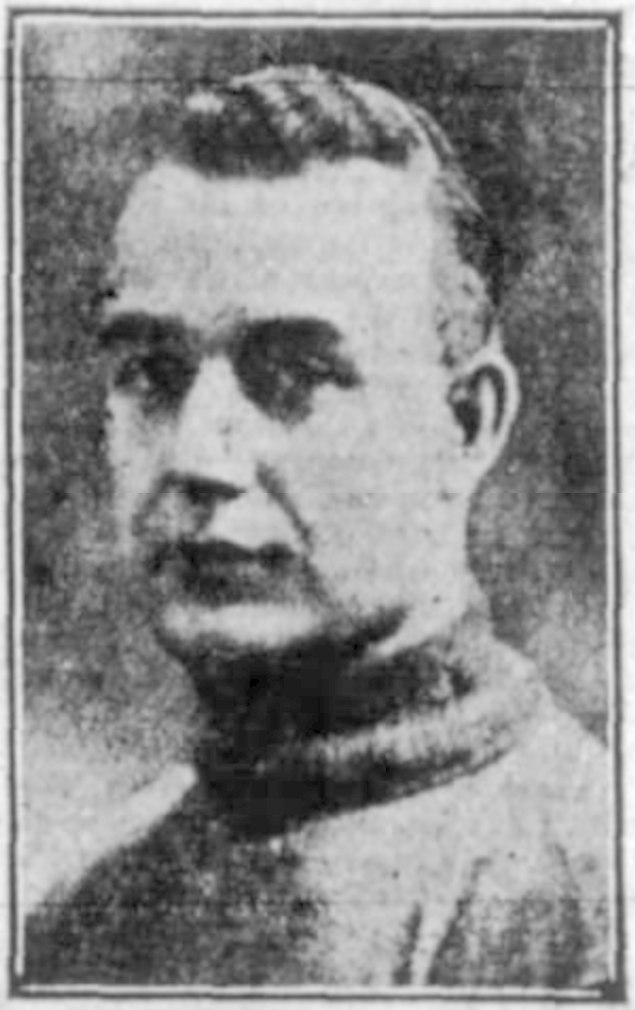
- Born: October 6, 1898 Morrisburg, Ontario, Canada
- Died: August 1, 1963 (aged 64) Toronto, Ontario, Canada
- Height: 5 ft 9 in (175 cm)
- Weight: 170 lb (77 kg; 12 st 2 lb)
- Position: Goaltender
- Caught: Left
- Played for: NHL; New York Americans; New York Rangers; Pittsburgh Pirates; Philadelphia Quakers; AHA; St. Paul Saints; CPHL; Niagara Falls Cataracts
- Playing career: 1916–1932
- Football career

Profile
- Position: Halfback

Career history
- 1924-26: Ottawa Senators

Awards and highlights
- 2× Grey Cup champion, 1925, 1926

Joseph Anthony Miller (October 6, 1898 – August 1, 1963) was a Canadian professional ice hockey player and a Grey Cup champion Canadian football player. Miller was a goaltender for the New York Americans, New York Rangers, Pittsburgh Pirates and Philadelphia Quakers between 1927 and 1931. Miller was a member of the 1928 New York Rangers Stanley Cup championship team.

== Ice hockey ==
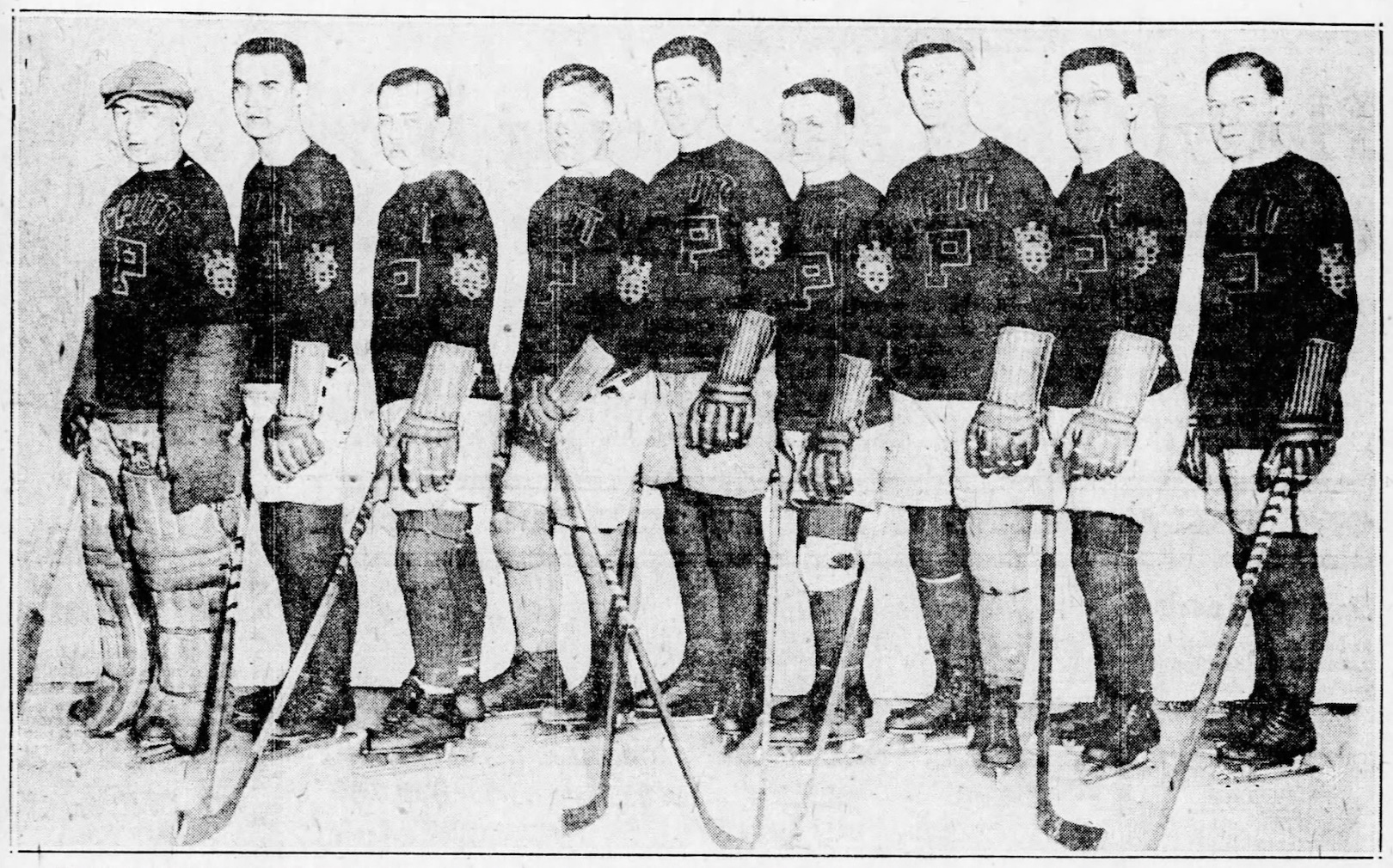
Miller (first player from the left) with the Fort Pitt Hornets in 1924–25

Joe Miller, a native of Morrisburg, Ontario, first came onto the ice hockey scene with the Pittsburgh Athletic Association (PAA) in 1916–17, playing 40 games for the club before heading back to Canada where he would play for seven years with Renfrew and the Ottawa New Edinburghs. He then reappeared in Pittsburgh for the 1924–25 season, to play with the Fort Pitt Hornets in the United States Amateur Hockey Association, and then the two following seasons he played with the St. Paul Saints in Minnesota.

Miller played for the New York Americans in 1928 when he was sent to the minors after being waived by the Americans. By an interesting set of circumstances his Stanley Cup opportunity arose. His season with Niagara Falls over, Miller was at home in Ottawa when New York Rangers goaltender Lorne Chabot was injured in the second game of the Stanley Cup Final. Rangers coach and General manager Lester Patrick asked the Americans and the Maroons for permission to use Miller for the remainder of the series. The Americans agreed but Montreal Maroons head coach Eddie Gerard forced Lester Patrick to play goal for the rest of that game. Miller was the designated backup for all NHL teams at the time, and he was loaned to the Rangers. Miller played three games for the Rangers, winning the Stanley Cup.

Later he played for the Pittsburgh Pirates and the Philadelphia Quakers. He wore uniform number 1.

== Football ==
Miller was a skilled multi-sport athlete and was an accomplished elite football player. Suiting up for three seasons with the Ottawa Senators (an interim name for the Ottawa Rough Riders) he was a star player and part of two Grey Cup championship teams. In 1925 he was integral to his team's success, but missed the Grey Cup due to his hockey commitment in St. Paul. He was the star of the 14th Grey Cup in 1926, scoring three vital late games "rouges" (single points) and staving off two critical potential turnovers.

== Stanley Cup and Grey Cup legacy ==
Miller's two sport championship achievement makes him one of only three people to have their names engraved on both of Canada's premier sport trophies, the Stanley Cup and the Grey Cup, as players. The others are Lionel Conacher and Carl Voss.

In 1967 Joseph ‘Joe’ A. Miller was inducted into the Ottawa Sports Hall of Fame.

== Career statistics ==
=== Regular season and playoffs ===
			Regular season								Playoffs
Season	Team	League	GP	W	L	T	Min	GA	SO	GAA	GP	W	L	T	Min	GA	SO	GAA
1916–17	Pittsburgh Athletic Association	Exhib	40	37	3	0	2447	63	5	1.54	—	—	—	—	—	—	—	—
1917–18	Renfrew Creamery Kings	Exhib	7	4	3	0	432	16	0	2.22	—	—	—	—	—	—	—	—
1918–19	Ottawa New Edinburghs	OCHL	4	3	1	0	240	5	2	1.25	—	—	—	—	—	—	—	—
1919–20	Ottawa New Edinburghs	OCHL	7	4	2	0	400	10	1	1.50	—	—	—	—	—	—	—	—
1920–21	Ottawa New Edinburghs	OCHL	11	4	6	1	675	25	0	2.22	—	—	—	—	—	—	—	—
1921–22	Ottawa New Edinburghs	OCHL	13	4	7	2	780	30	2	2.31	—	—	—	—	—	—	—	—
1922–23	Ottawa New Edinburghs	OCHL	18	10	6	2	1200	43	2	2.15	5	1	3	1	340	8	1	1.41
1923–24	Ottawa New Edinburghs	OCHL	12	9	3	0	720	18	1	1.50	2	0	2	0	120	5	0	2.50
1924–25	Fort Pitt Hornets	USAHA	22	17	5	0	1020	39	1	1.72	4	1	3	0	220	9	0	2.45
1925–26	St. Paul Saints	CHL	38	—	—	—	2280	70	6	1.84	—	—	—	—	—	—	—	—
1926–27	St. Paul Saints	AHA	30	13	12	5	1850	54	10	1.75	—	—	—	—	—	—	—	—
1927–28	New York Americans	NHL	28	8	16	4	1721	77	5	2.68	—	—	—	—	—	—	—	—
1927–28	Niagara Falls Cataracts	Can-Pro	13	—	—	—	780	30	2	2.31	—	—	—	—	—	—	—	—
1927–28	New York Rangers	NHL	—	—	—	—	—	—	—	—	3	2	1	0	180	3	1	1.00
1928–29	Pittsburgh Pirates	NHL	44	9	27	8	2780	80	11	1.73	—	—	—	—	—	—	—	—
1929–30	Pittsburgh Pirates	NHL	43	5	35	3	2630	179	0	4.08	—	—	—	—	—	—	—	—
1930–31	Philadelphia Quakers	NHL	15	2	11	1	821	47	0	3.43	—	—	—	—	—	—	—	—
1929–30	New York Americans	NHL	1	0	0	1	70	1	0	0.86	—	—	—	—	—	—	—	—
1931–32	Syracuse Stars	IHL	20	5	11	4	1260	51	3	2.43	—	—	—	—	—	—	—	—
NHL totals			130	24	89	16	7952	383	16	2.89	3	2	1	0	180	3	1	1.00
