= Bun Cook =

Canadian ice hockey player and coach (1903–1988)

- Hockey Hall of Fame, 1995
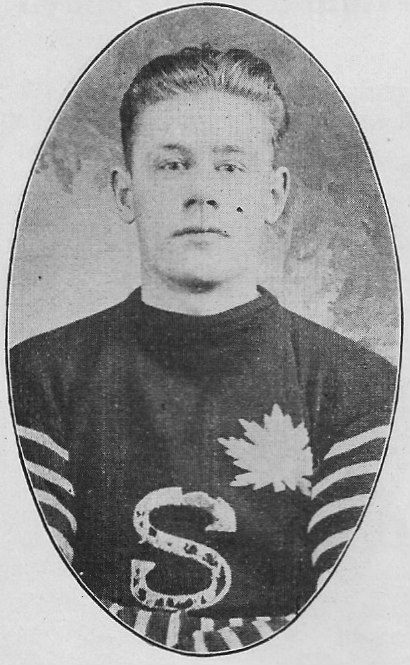
- Cook with the Sault Ste. Marie Greyhounds in 1922
- Born: September 18, 1903 Kingston, Ontario, Canada
- Died: March 19, 1988 (aged 84) Kingston, Ontario, Canada
- Height: 5 ft 11 in (180 cm)
- Weight: 180 lb (82 kg; 12 st 12 lb)
- Position: Left wing
- Shot: Left
- Played for: Saskatoon Crescents; New York Rangers; Boston Bruins
- Playing career: 1926–1937

Frederick Joseph "Bun" Cook (September 18, 1903 – March 19, 1988) was a Canadian professional ice hockey coach and forward. He was an Allan Cup champion with the Sault Ste. Marie Greyhounds in 1924 before embarking on a 13-year professional career. He played for the Saskatoon Crescents in the Western Canada Hockey League (WCHL) and the New York Rangers and Boston Bruins in the National Hockey League (NHL). Cook was a member of two Stanley Cup championship teams with the Rangers, in 1928 and 1933, playing on the "Bread Line" with his brother Bill and Frank Boucher.

Cook turned to coaching in 1937 and spent 19 years in the American Hockey League (AHL), with the Providence Reds for six seasons and the remainder with the Cleveland Barons. His 636 wins as a coach is the second most in AHL history and he led his teams to the playoffs in all but one season. Cook was named an AHL All-Star coach on six occasions, and led his teams to a record seven Calder Cup championships. He was posthumously inducted into the Hockey Hall of Fame in 1995 and to the AHL Hall of Fame in 2007.

He was the last surviving former player of the Saskatoon Crescents.

== Early life ==
Frederick Joseph Cook was born September 18, 1903, in Kingston, Ontario. He was part of a large family, and the second of three brothers, following Bill and preceding Alexander ("Bud"). Despite their eight-year difference age, Bun frequently followed Bill to new teams and the pair spent most of their careers playing together. Bun joined Bill in playing senior hockey with the Sault Ste. Marie Greyhounds in 1921, and while Bill had already left the team by that point, Bun was a member of the Greyhounds squad that won the Allan Cup in 1924 as senior champions of Canada. Following the championship, Bun turned professional by signing with the Saskatoon Crescents of the Western Canada Hockey League (WCHL) for the 1924–25 season. Bill had already played two years in Saskatoon by that point and housed his younger brother during their shared tenure with the team.

== Playing career ==
Cook played two seasons in the Western League. He scored 17 goals in 28 games in 1924–25 and added eight more in 30 games the following season. The league had run into financial difficulty in its final seasons, and after 1926, ceased operations. The Montreal Maroons intended to sign both Cook and his brother Bill to join their team for the 1926–27 NHL season. While the team's manager waited in Montreal to meet the brothers, Conn Smythe, manager of the newly formed New York Rangers, travelled to Winnipeg to reach the pair first. Smythe signed both Cook brothers for $12,000. The brothers convinced Smythe to sign Frank Boucher, who also played in the WCHL, and the trio to form the "Bread Line", one of the early NHL's most prolific scoring lines.

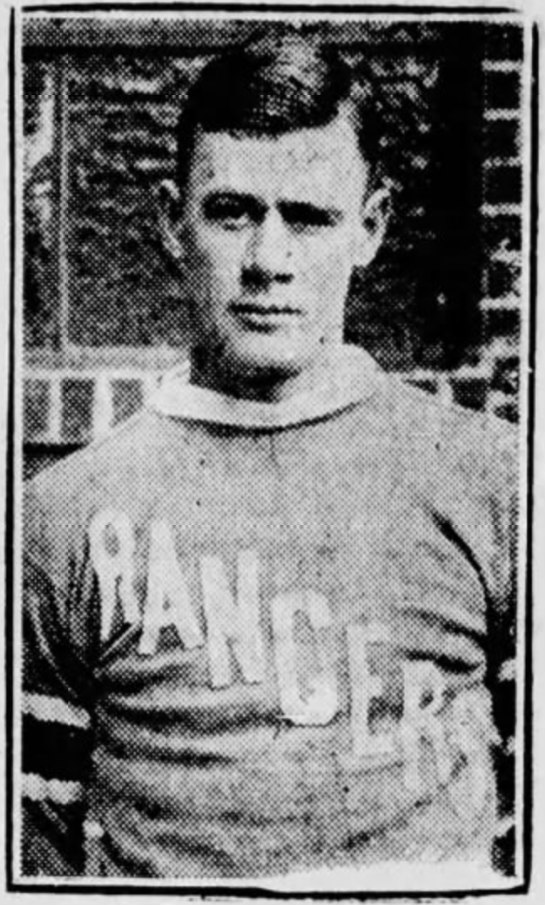
Cook with the New York Rangers in 1926–27

The expansion Rangers made their debut on November 16, 1926. Cook assisted on the first goal in franchise history, scored by his brother, and which stood as the only marker in a 1–0 victory. During the season, Cook earned his nickname "Bun" from a journalist who claimed he was "quick as a bunny" on the ice. He finished the 1926–27 season with 23 points in 44 games then improved to 28 points in 1927–28. Cook led the Rangers with 14 assists on the year. The Rangers finished second in the American Division that season and defeated the Pittsburgh Pirates and Boston Bruins to reach the 1928 Stanley Cup Final against the Maroons. The Bread Line scored every Rangers goal in the series. The second game was notable for having Rangers coach Lester Patrick play goal after regular goaltender Lorne Chabot was injured. New York won that game, 2–1, and went on to capture the franchise's first Stanley Cup championship.

Cook's offence declined in 1928–29 as he recorded only 18 points. Attempting to defend their championship, the Rangers reached the 1929 Stanley Cup Final, but were defeated by the Boston Bruins. The 1929–30 season was statistically Cook's best in professional hockey. He finished tenth in the NHL with 24 goals and totaled 43 points in 44 games. Following a 35-point season in 1930–31, he was named to the inaugural NHL All-Star team as the second team left wing. Cook scored 34 points the following season. The Rangers won the American Division title and reached the 1932 Stanley Cup Final but lost the series to the Toronto Maple Leafs.

With 22 goals in 1932–33, Cook finished fourth in the NHL, while his 37 points were seventh best. The Rangers reached the 1933 Stanley Cup Final, and Cook had two opportunities to end the series in the deciding fourth game: He was unable to score on a breakaway late in regulation time, while he and Bill nearly teamed up to end the contest early in overtime. Bill ultimately scored the winning goal in a 1–0 victory as the Rangers won their second Stanley Cup championship.

Cook was a consistent scorer the following two seasons as he recorded 33 points in 1933–34 and 34 points in 1934–35. However, he missed much of the 1935–36 season due to an arthritic condition. Believing he would not recover, the Rangers sold Cook to the Boston Bruins. The transaction broke up the Bread Line, which had been together for nine seasons. He appeared in 40 games for the Bruins in 1936–37, his final NHL season, and recorded nine points.

In 531 career professional games, Cook scored 183 goals and 335 points. He was also an early innovator of the slapshot and of the drop pass. According to Cook: "I had a dream about the drop pass one night and at our next practice, I told Frank and Bill about it. They thought I was crazy, but they decided to humour me. By gosh, it worked! I'd cross over from left wing to centre as I moved in on defense. I'd fake a shot and leave the puck behind and skate away from it, with Frank or Bill picking it up. We got a lot of goals off the crisscross and drop pass." Ed Sullivan, then of the New York Graphic, praised Cook's creativity: "When Bun Cook is hot, he is one of the most amazing players in hockey. At such moments, he attempts plays that stagger the imagination." In 1995, Cook was inducted into the Hockey Hall of Fame by the veterans committee. Often overshadowed by his linemates, he was the last member of the Bread Line to gain entry into the Hall, as he followed Bill (1952) and Frank Boucher (1958).

== Coaching career ==
After retiring from the NHL in 1937, Cook turned to coaching and became the head coach of the Providence Reds in the International-American Hockey League (IAHL; later the American Hockey League, AHL). He guided the Reds to a 25–16–7 record and a first-place finish in the Eastern Division, as well as a Calder Cup championship after the Reds defeated the Syracuse Stars. Following the 1938–39 season, Cook was named to the IAHL/AHL All-Star team for the first time of four consecutive seasons.

In 1942, Cook served as coach of the Eastern Division team at the first AHL All-Star Game. He coached the Reds for six seasons, until 1942–43. The Reds won three division titles and a second Calder Cup in 1940. Occasionally pressed into playing duty, Cook also appeared in 37 games for the Reds over that time, and recorded what ultimately was his final professional goal, the game-winner in a 3–2 victory over the New Haven Eagles on December 17, 1942.

Cook left Providence to become head coach of the Cleveland Barons in 1943–44. The Barons won their division six times in Cook's first nine seasons as coach. They reached the Calder Cup Final on six occasions in that time and won three championships: in 1944–45, 1947–48 and 1950–51. He was considered a favourite to become head coach of the Boston Bruins in 1950, but never left Cleveland.

In 1952–53, Cook coached the Barons to both the regular season championship and the Calder Cup as the Barons defeated the Pittsburgh Hornets by a 1–0 score in overtime of the seventh, and deciding, game of the series. Cook coached the Barons to a repeat championship in 1953–54, his seventh Calder Cup victory. With a record of 26–31–7, 1955–56 season was the first in 13 seasons with the Barons that Cook coached the team to a losing record. Though the team reached the league championship series, the Barons opted to relieve Cook of his position as coach.

Cook spent one season coaching the Sault Ste. Marie Greyhounds of the Northern Ontario Hockey League, in 1956–57, then spent three seasons with the Kingston Frontenacs of the Eastern Professional Hockey League until his retirement in 1961. Cook retired as the most successful coach in AHL history. His seven Calder Cups are four more than anyone else, and his 636 career wins were the most in league history for a half-century (Roy Sommer would pass him in 2016). He was inducted into the American Hockey League Hall of Fame in 2007.

== Personal life ==
Bill Cook was given a land grant following the First World War, and became a farmer on a half section of land near Lac Vert, Saskatchewan. Bun followed his elder brother to the prairie province and farmed an adjacent half section. Following his career in hockey, Cook ultimately returned to his hometown of Kingston where he died on March 19, 1988.

== Career statistics ==
=== Regular season and playoffs ===
| | | | Regular season | | | | | Playoffs |
| Season | Team | League | GP | G | A | Pts | PIM | GP | G | A | Pts | PIM |
|---|---|---|---|---|---|---|---|---|---|---|---|---|
| 1921–22 | Sault Ste. Marie Greyhounds | NOHA | 3 | 2 | 1 | 3 | 2 | — | — | — | — | — |
| 1922–23 | Sault Ste. Marie Greyhounds | NOHA | 8 | 2 | 3 | 5 | 10 | 2 | 0 | 2 | 2 | 0 |
| 1922–23 | Sault Ste. Marie Greyhounds | Al-Cup | — | — | — | — | — | 3 | 2 | 0 | 2 | 4 |
| 1923–24 | Sault Ste. Marie Greyhounds | NOHA | 8 | 3 | 3 | 6 | 10 | 7 | 1 | 0 | 1 | 8 |
| 1924–25 | Saskatoon Crescents | WCHL | 28 | 18 | 3 | 21 | 48 | 2 | 0 | 1 | 1 | 0 |
| 1925–26 | Saskatoon Sheiks | WHL | 30 | 9 | 5 | 14 | 20 | 2 | 0 | 0 | 0 | 0 |
| 1926–27 | New York Rangers | NHL | 44 | 14 | 9 | 23 | 42 | 2 | 0 | 0 | 0 | 6 |
| 1927–28 | New York Rangers | NHL | 44 | 14 | 14 | 28 | 45 | 9 | 2 | 1 | 3 | 10 |
| 1928–29 | New York Rangers | NHL | 43 | 13 | 5 | 18 | 70 | 6 | 1 | 0 | 1 | 12 |
| 1929–30 | New York Rangers | NHL | 43 | 24 | 18 | 42 | 55 | 4 | 2 | 0 | 2 | 2 |
| 1930–31 | New York Rangers | NHL | 44 | 18 | 17 | 35 | 72 | 4 | 0 | 0 | 0 | 2 |
| 1931–32 | New York Rangers | NHL | 45 | 14 | 20 | 34 | 43 | 7 | 6 | 2 | 8 | 12 |
| 1932–33 | New York Rangers | NHL | 48 | 22 | 15 | 37 | 35 | 8 | 2 | 0 | 2 | 4 |
| 1933–34 | New York Rangers | NHL | 48 | 18 | 15 | 33 | 36 | 2 | 0 | 0 | 0 | 2 |
| 1934–35 | New York Rangers | NHL | 48 | 13 | 21 | 34 | 26 | 4 | 2 | 0 | 2 | 0 |
| 1935–36 | New York Rangers | NHL | 26 | 4 | 5 | 9 | 12 | — | — | — | — | — |
| 1936–37 | Boston Bruins | NHL | 40 | 4 | 5 | 9 | 8 | — | — | — | — | — |
| 1937–38 | Providence Reds | IAHL | 19 | 0 | 1 | 1 | 14 | — | — | — | — | — |
| 1938–39 | Providence Reds | IAHL | 11 | 1 | 3 | 4 | 4 | — | — | — | — | — |
| 1939–40 | Providence Reds | IAHL | 1 | 0 | 0 | 0 | 0 | — | — | — | — | — |
| 1940–41 | Providence Reds | AHL | 1 | 0 | 0 | 0 | 0 | — | — | — | — | — |
| 1941–42 | Providence Reds | AHL | 2 | 0 | 1 | 1 | 0 | — | — | — | — | — |
| 1942–43 | Providence Reds | AHL | 3 | 1 | 1 | 2 | 4 | — | — | — | — | — |
| NHL totals | | | 473 | 158 | 144 | 302 | 444 | 46 | 15 | 3 | 18 | 50 |

=== Coaching career ===
| Season | Team | League | Regular season | | | | | | Postseason |
| Season | Team | League | G | W | L | T | Pct | Division rank | Result |
|---|---|---|---|---|---|---|---|---|---|
| 1937–38 | Providence Reds | IAHL | 48 | 25 | 16 | 7 | .594 | 1st, East | Won Calder Cup |
| 1938–39 | Providence Reds | IAHL | 54 | 21 | 22 | 11 | .491 | 2nd, East | Lost semifinal |
| 1939–40 | Providence Reds | IAHL | 54 | 27 | 19 | 8 | .574 | 1st, East | Won Calder Cup |
| 1940–41 | Providence Reds | AHL | 56 | 31 | 21 | 4 | .589 | 1st, East | Lost semifinal |
| 1941–42 | Providence Reds | AHL | 56 | 17 | 32 | 7 | .366 | 4th, East | Did not qualify |
| 1942–43 | Providence Reds | AHL | 56 | 27 | 27 | 2 | .500 | 5th overall | Lost quarterfinal |
| 1943–44 | Cleveland Barons | AHL | 54 | 33 | 14 | 7 | .676 | 1st, West | Lost final |
| 1944–45 | Cleveland Barons | AHL | 60 | 34 | 16 | 10 | .650 | 1st, West | Won Calder Cup |
| 1945–46 | Cleveland Barons | AHL | 62 | 28 | 26 | 8 | .516 | 3rd, West | Lost final |
| 1946–47 | Cleveland Barons | AHL | 64 | 38 | 18 | 8 | .656 | 1st, West | Lost semifinal |
| 1947–48 | Cleveland Barons | AHL | 68 | 43 | 13 | 2 | .721 | 1st, West | Won Calder Cup |
| 1948–49 | Cleveland Barons | AHL | 68 | 41 | 21 | 6 | .647 | 3rd, West | Lost semifinal |
| 1949–50 | Cleveland Barons | AHL | 70 | 45 | 15 | 10 | .714 | 1st, West | Lost final |
| 1950–51 | Cleveland Barons | AHL | 71 | 44 | 22 | 5 | .655 | 1st, West | Won Calder Cup |
| 1951–52 | Cleveland Barons | AHL | 68 | 44 | 19 | 5 | .684 | 2nd, West | Lost quarterfinal |
| 1952–53 | Cleveland Barons | AHL | 64 | 42 | 20 | 2 | .672 | 1st overall | Won Calder Cup |
| 1953–54 | Cleveland Barons | AHL | 70 | 38 | 32 | 0 | .543 | 3rd overall | Won Calder Cup |
| 1954–55 | Cleveland Barons | AHL | 64 | 32 | 29 | 3 | .523 | 2nd overall | Lost semifinal |
| 1955–56 | Cleveland Barons | AHL | 64 | 26 | 31 | 7 | .461 | 4th overall | Lost final |
| AHL totals | | | 1171 | 636 | 413 | 122 | .595 | | 7 Calder Cups |
