= 1927–28 NHL transactions =

The following is a list of all team-to-team transactions that have occurred in the National Hockey League (NHL) during the 1927–28 NHL season. It lists which team each player has been traded to and for which player(s) or other consideration(s), if applicable.

== Transactions ==
May 16, 1927	To Toronto Maple Leafs Art Duncan	To Detroit Cougars Bill Brydge
May 22, 1927	To Detroit Cougars Harry Meeking	To Boston Bruins Fred Gordon
May 22, 1927	To Boston Bruins Carson Cooper	To Montreal Canadiens Billy Boucher
May 22, 1927	To Detroit Cougars Carson Cooper	To Boston Bruins cash
October 1, 1927	To Toronto Maple Leafs rights to Eric Pettinger	To New York Rangers rights to Yip Foster
October 4, 1927	To Detroit Cougars Reg Noble	To Montreal Maroons $7,500 cash
October 7, 1927	To Montreal Maroons Hooley Smith	To Ottawa Senators Punch Broadbent $22,500 cash
October 10, 1927	To Detroit Cougars Stan Brown	To New York Rangers Archie Briden; Harry Meeking
October 14, 1927	To New York Americans cash	To New York Rangers rights to Laurie Scott
October 17, 1927	To New York Americans Billy Boucher	To Montreal Canadiens cash
October 26, 1927	To Toronto Maple Leafs Edwin Gorman	To Ottawa Senators cash
November 5, 1927	To Toronto Maple Leafs cash	To Pittsburgh Pirates Art Duncan
December 1, 1927	To Toronto Maple Leafs Eddie Rodden	3 team trade with Chicago Blackhawks and Pittsburgh Pirates
December 1, 1927	To Chicago Blackhawks Ty Arbour	3 team trade with Toronto Maple Leafs and Pittsburgh Pirates
December 1, 1927	To Pittsburgh Pirates Bert McCaffrey	3 team trade with Chicago Blackhawks and Toronto Maple Leafs
December 16, 1927	To Pittsburgh Pirates loan of Marty Burke for remainder of 1927–28 season	To Montreal Canadiens loan of Charlie Langlois for remainder of 1927–28 season
December 16, 1927	To Detroit Cougars Gord Fraser $5,000 cash	To Chicago Blackhawks Duke Keats
December 21, 1927	To Toronto Maple Leafs Jimmy Herbert	To Boston Bruins $15,000 cash rights to Eric Pettinger
December 30, 1927	To Montreal Canadiens cash	To Chicago Blackhawks loan of Leo Lafrance
February 8, 1928	To Toronto Maple Leafs cash	To Montreal Canadiens George Patterson
February 13, 1928	To Detroit Cougars cash loan of Pete Palangio	To Montreal Canadiens Stan Brown
April 8, 1928	To Toronto Maple Leafs $12,500 cash rights to Jack Arbour	To Detroit Cougars Jimmy Herbert
April 16, 1928	To Toronto Maple Leafs Alex Gray	To New York Rangers Butch Keeling
