= The Gentle Art of Burglary =

1916 short film by Raymond L. Schrock

- Directed by: Raymond L. Schrock
- Written by: Raymond L. Schrock (Scenario)
- Starring: William Garwood; Violet Mersereau; Paddy Sullivan
- Distributed by: Universal Film Manufacturing Company
- Release date: July 18, 1916
- Country: United States
- Languages: Silent film English intertitles

The Gentle Art of Burglary is a 1916 American silent-short comedy directed by Raymond L. Schrock, starring William Garwood, Violet Mersereau, and Paddy Sullivan.
