= 1928 Stanley Cup Final =

1928 ice hockey championship series

	1	2	3	4	5	Total
New York Rangers	0	2*	0	1	2	3
Montreal Maroons	2	1*	2	0	1	2
- * – Denotes overtime period(s)
- Location(s): Montreal: Montreal Forum
- Format: best-of-five
- Coaches: New York: Lester Patrick; Montreal: Eddie Gerard
- Captains: New York: Bill Cook; Montreal: Dunc Munro
- Dates: April 5–14, 1928
- Series-winning goal: Frank Boucher (3:35, third)
- Hall of Famers: Rangers: Frank Boucher (1958); Bill Cook (1952); Bun Cook (1995); Ching Johnson (1958); Lester Patrick (1947); Maroons: Clint Benedict (1965); Red Dutton (1958); Babe Siebert (1964); Hooley Smith (1972); Nels Stewart (1962); Coaches: Eddie Gerard (1945, player); Lester Patrick (1947, player)

The 1928 Stanley Cup Final was a best-of-five series played entirely in Montreal between the New York Rangers and the Montreal Maroons. It was the first appearance by the Rangers in the Finals in only their second season. The Maroons made their second Finals appearance after winning the Stanley Cup in 1926. The Rangers won the series three games to two to earn their first championship in franchise history; this was also the second Stanley Cup victory by an American-based team, and the first since the Seattle Metropolitans in 1917. This was also the first of only two times that a Montreal-based team lost the clinching game of the Stanley Cup Finals at home in the Montreal Forum, the other occurred in 1989 when the Calgary Flames defeated the Montreal Canadiens. This was the last Stanley Cup Finals to be played in one location until the pandemic shortened season of 2020, when it was held entirely at Rogers Place in Edmonton, Alberta, Canada.

== Paths to the Finals ==
The Montreal Maroons defeated the Ottawa Senators in the quarter-finals total-goals series 3–1. The Maroons then defeated the Montreal Canadiens in the semi-finals total-goals series 3–2 to reach the Finals.

The New York Rangers defeated the Pittsburgh Pirates in the quarter-finals total-goals series 6–4. The Rangers then defeated the Boston Bruins in the semi-finals total-goals series 5–2 to reach the Finals.

== Game summaries ==
The series had to be played in Montreal, as the circus had taken over New York's Madison Square Garden.

The Rangers lost their goalie Lorne Chabot to an eye injury in the second period of game two. Although goaltenders Alex Connell and Hugh McCormick were in the stands, the Maroons refused to allow the Rangers to use either goalie. In one of the most famous incidents in hockey history, 44-year-old coach Lester Patrick took over with the recorded words "Boys, don't let an old man down." Pittsburgh Pirates player/coach Odie Cleghorn, who also happened to be in the stands for the game, was recruited to be on the bench for the Rangers, where he told them to try and not let Montreal get shots. Patrick's efforts inspired the Rangers to a 2–1 victory in overtime. At 44 years, 99 days old, Patrick became the oldest man to play in the Stanley Cup Finals, a record which remains unsurpassed to this day (Chris Chelios in 2008 at the age of 46 became the oldest player with his name on the cup, though he did not log any ice time in the final). He entered with eight minutes remaining in the second period and played the final 35:05 of the game.

For the following matches, the Rangers hired New York Americans goalie Joe Miller, who won two games including a shutout. Miller was available to all NHL teams as a backup after the Americans had put him on waivers. The Boston Bruins had claimed him on waivers, but he was made available to any NHL team. At the time of the Finals, Miller had not played in four weeks, and was home in Ottawa. Miller was cut and suffered two black eyes in game five, but hung on for a 2–1 victory.

April 5	New York Rangers	0–2	Montreal Maroons	Montreal Forum	Recap
No scoring		First period	No scoring
No scoring		Second period	10:48 – Red Dutton (1)
No scoring		Third period	05:56 – Merlyn Phillips (1)
Lorne Chabot		Goalie stats	Clint Benedict

April 7	New York Rangers	2–1	OT	Montreal Maroons	Montreal Forum	Recap
No scoring		First period		No scoring
No scoring		Second period		No scoring
Bill Cook (1) – 00:30		Third period		18:51 – Nels Stewart (1)
Frank Boucher (4) – 07:05		First overtime period		No scoring
Lorne Chabot & Lester Patrick		Goalie stats		Clint Benedict

April 10	New York Rangers	0–2	Montreal Maroons	Montreal Forum	Recap
No scoring		First period	No scoring
No scoring		Second period	09:00 – Nels Stewart (2)
No scoring		Third period	17:20 – Babe Siebert (2)
Joe Miller		Goalie stats	Clint Benedict

April 12	New York Rangers	1–0	Montreal Maroons	Montreal Forum	Recap
No scoring		First period	No scoring
Frank Boucher (5) – 13:13		Second period	No scoring
No scoring		Third period	No scoring
Joe Miller		Goalie stats	Clint Benedict

April 14	New York Rangers	2–1	Montreal Maroons	Montreal Forum	Recap
Frank Boucher (6) – 17:05		First period	No scoring
No scoring		Second period	No scoring
Frank Boucher (7) – 15:16		Third period	17:16 – Merlyn Phillips (2)
Joe Miller		Goalie stats	Clint Benedict

New York won series 3–2

== Stanley Cup engraving ==
The 1928 Stanley Cup was presented to Rangers captain Bill Cook by NHL President Frank Calder following the Rangers 2–1 win over the Maroons in game five.

The following Rangers players and staff had their names engraved on the Stanley Cup

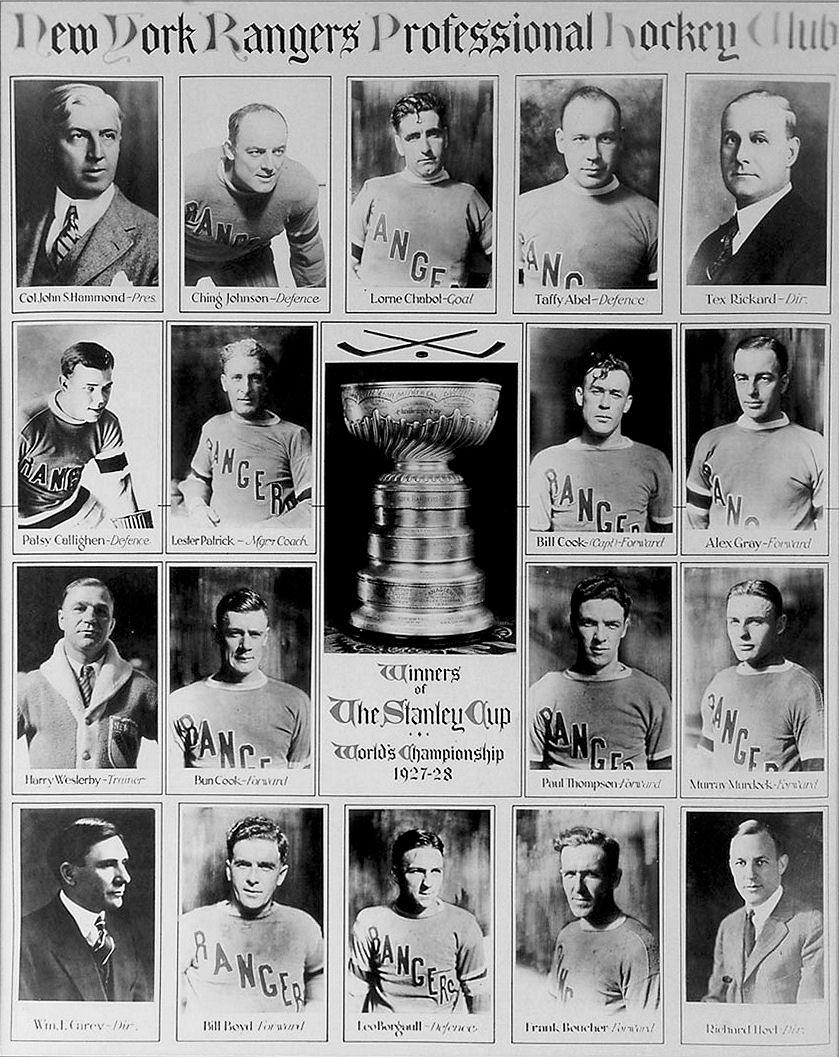
New York Rangers 1928 Stanley Cup champions

Frank Boucher became the fourth member of his family to win the Stanley Cup, after his brother George won it four times with Ottawa, and his brothers Billy and Bobby had won it with Montreal in 1924.

1927–28 New York Rangers

=== Players ===
Centres

- 5 Bill Cook (Captain)
- 7 Frank Boucher

Wingers

- 2 Alex Gray
- 6 Fred “Bun” Cook
- 8 Billy Boyd
- 9 Murray Murdoch
- 10 Paul Thompson

Defencemen

- 3 Ivan “Ching” Johnson
- 4 Clarence “Taffy” Abel
- 12 Leo Bourgeault
- 14 Frank “Patsy” Callighen

Goaltenders

- 1 Lorne Chabot
- 1 Joe Miller (Sub)
- 16 Lester Patrick (Playing-Manager-Coach)

=== Coaching and administrative staff ===
- John Hommond (President/Owner), William Carey (Director)
- Richard Hojt (Director), George Rickard (Director)
- Harry Westerby (Trainer)

=== Stanley Cup engraving ===
- By winning the Stanley Cup in 1928 Joe Miller became first player to win the Grey Cup & Stanley Cup in their career. He had won the Grey Cup 1925, 1926 with the Ottawa Senators. (See Lionel Conacher, Carl Voss, Leo Dandurand, Harold Ballard, Norman Kwong & Wayne Gretzky also won both the Grey Cup and Stanley Cup.)
- #11 Laurie Scott (C) played 23 of 44 regular season games. He was sent to the minors before the playoffs, so his name was left off the Stanley Cup. Scott was included on mid-season team picture, but not on the Stanley Cup winning picture.

== Three champions ==
With the Rangers' triumph, the city of New York became home of the titlists of all three major sports leagues, including the 1927 World Series-winning New York Yankees and the 1927 National Football League champion New York Giants (the Yankees won again in 1928, giving New York bragging rights over MLB, the NFL and NHL for almost 14 months, until the Providence Steamrollers clinched the NFL title in December of that year). The only other city to pull off this feat is Detroit, whose Tigers, Lions and Red Wings reigned over the pro sports scene in 1935.

== See also ==
- 1927–28 NHL season

Preceded by Ottawa Senators; 1927	New York Rangers; Stanley Cup champions 1928	Succeeded by Boston Bruins; 1929
