= Fort Pitt Hornets =

- City: Pittsburgh, Pennsylvania, United States
- League: USAHA
- Division: Eastern Division
- Founded: 1924
- Operated: 1924–1925
- Home arena: Duquesne Garden
- Colors: Black, gold
- President: Garnet Sixsmith
- General manager: H.N. Forner
- Head coach: Dinny Manners
- Captain: Paddy Sullivan

Championships
- Division titles: 1924–25

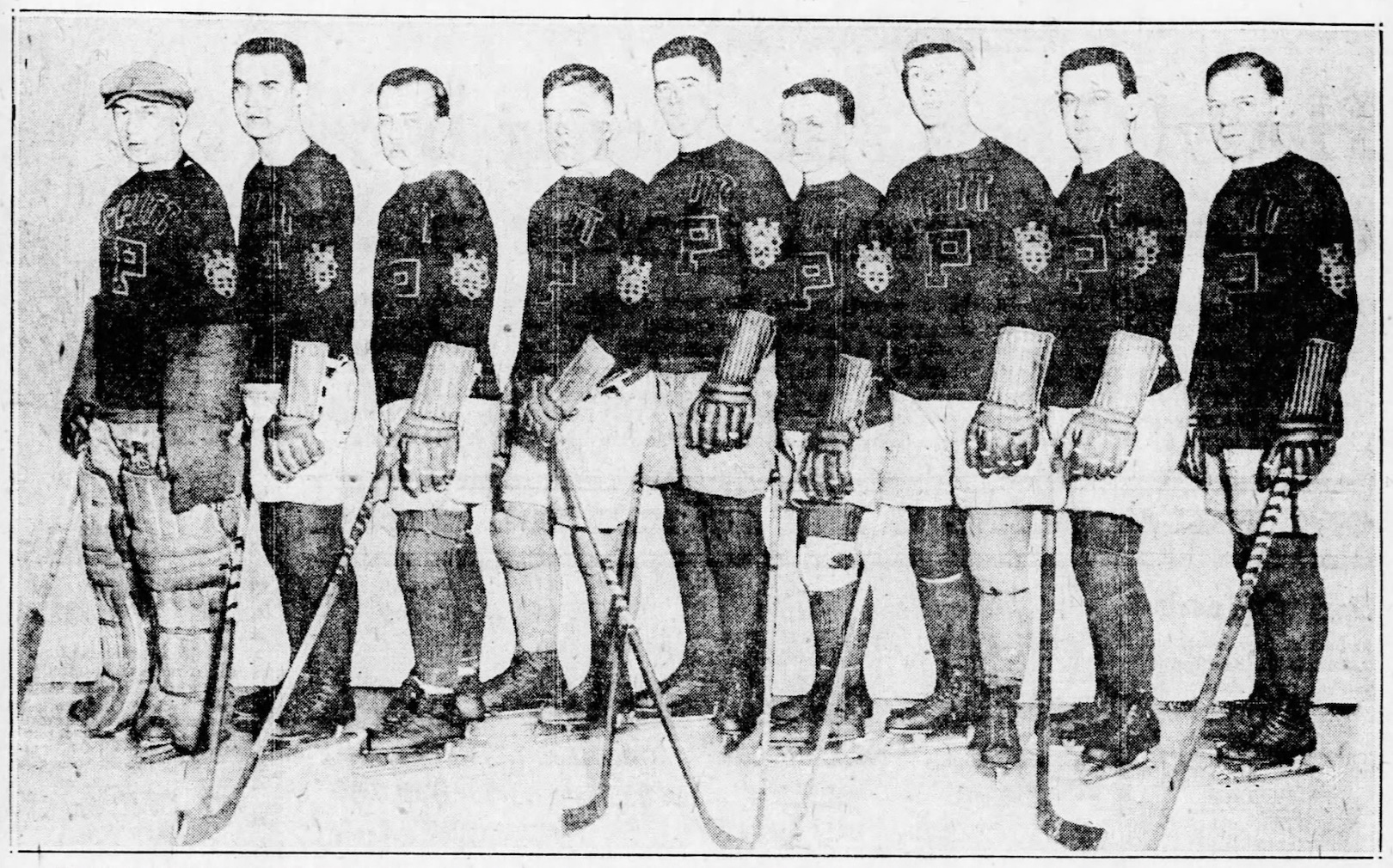
Fort Pitt Hornets in 1924–25, from left to right: Joe Miller, Joe Sills, Bonner Larose, Johnny McKinnon, Hector Lépine, Paddy Sullivan, Lorne Armstrong, Terry McGovern, Dinny Manners

The Fort Pitt Hornets (sometimes incorrectly referred to as the Fort Pitt Panthers) were a semi-professional ice hockey team based in Pittsburgh, Pennsylvania. The team played in the United States Amateur Hockey Association (USAHA), which was technically a semi-pro league by 1924.

== History ==
The Hornets were a spin-off of another USAHA club from Pittsburgh, the Yellow Jackets, and played in the league's Eastern Division. During the 1924–25 season, the Hornets finished their season with a 17–7–0 record for first place in the Eastern Division. However, the club was defeated in the USAHA championship series by their intra-city rivals, the Yellow Jackets, three games to none with one tie. Former Yellow Jackets player-coach Dinny Manners served as a player-coach for the Hornets.

== Rough-play allegations ==
The USAHA teams were known, at this time, for their rough play. During the Hornets' first round of the 1924–25 playoffs, which was against the Boston Athletic Association, Pittsburgh player, Joe Sills reportedly butt-ended Leo Hughes in the face, requiring the removal of one Hughes' eyes, and nearly the other. The Boston AA’s player was a fan favourite and the team's supporters protested the hit. Boston then threatened to quit the league because of the "Unnecessary and willful roughing." However, Pittsburgh's manager, H.N. Forner, contended that injuries that were inflicted to his players, such as the case with the Hornets' Lorne Armstrong, could have been just as serious. During the series, Armstrong was cut in the back of the neck by the skate of a Boston player. The following night, Armstrong received a cut between his eyes which could have taken one of his eyes, if the cut was an inch away in either direction. As for Joe Sills, he was reportedly kneed by a Boston player and unable to play for an entire week. After Leo Hughes had lost his eye against the Hornets, USAHA president William S. Haddock stated that "Hockey, you know, is not a parlour game."

== Prominent players ==
The Hornets featured several future-NHL players such as:

- Joe Miller
- Bernie Brophy
- Hector Lépine
- Charles Larose
- Johnny McKinnon
