= Leo Hughes =

American ice hockey player

- Born: September 6, 1896 Brooklyn, New York, U.S.
- Died: March 25, 1939 (aged 42) Newton, Massachusetts, U.S.
- Position: Forward
- Played for: Maple A. A. Boston A.A.
- Playing career: 1923–1925

Stephen Leo Hughes (September 6, 1896 – March 25, 1939) was an American ice hockey player for Boston College and the Boston Athletic Association. His playing career was cut short when he lost an eye in a 1925 game against the Fort Pitt Hornets.

== Early life ==
Hughes was born in Brooklyn and grew up in Newton, Massachusetts. He played football, hockey, and baseball at Newton High School. In football, he was the team's kicker, a strong runner and leading receiver for quarterback Hank Garrity, and an efficient defensive player. In 1917, Hughes was a member of the NHS hockey team that won the Interscholastic and Triangular League championships.

Hughes served in the United States Naval Reserve during World War I and resumed his education at the Dean Academy.

== Boston College ==
Hughes was a two time captain of the Eagles hockey team and helped lead Boston College to the American Collegiate Hockey Championships in 1922 and 1923. On December 28, 1922, Hughes scored all three goals in BC's 3–1 win over McGill Redbirds.

Hughes also was a four-year letterman in football. He was a reserve back on the undefeated 1920 Boston College Eagles football team.

== Boston Athletic Association ==
Hughes began his club career in 1923 with the Maple Athletic Association. On January 21, 1924, he scored the game–winning goal in the Maples' 2–1 victory over Boston College. In 1924, Hughes was a member of the Neponset Wanderers, an independent football team.

In 1924, Hughes joined the Boston Athletic Association. During the B.A.A.'s January 17, 1925 game against the Fort Pitt Hornets, the end of Hornet player Joe Stills' stick struck Hughes in face, which left him with a bad cut and knocked him unconscious. Doctors at the Eye and Ear Hospital found it necessary to remove Hughes' right eye, but were able to save the vision in his left eye. A benefit game between the B.A.A. and B.C. was held on February 9, 1925, and raised $3,100 for Hughes.

Stills was devastated by Hughes' injury and reportedly broke down in tears when he visited Hughes in the hospital. The two developed a friendship that lasted through Hughes' life. Hughes once stated that he did not suffer "nearly so much as the fellow who unintentionally caused the loss of my eye."

== Later life ==
In 1921, Hughes began working for the Newton playground department, where he held a variety of roles, including lifeguard, director of boy's activities, supervisor of Crystal Lake, and director of skating places.

In 1925, Hughes became the head hockey coach at Brookline High School. That same season, he served as manager and coach of the Pere Marquette team of the Eastern Amateur Hockey League and organized Leo Hughes' Newton Stars, an amateur team consisting of players from his hometown. In 1934, he coached the Berry Hockey Club.

In October 1937, Hughes married Kathleen Kelly of Chestnut Hill, Massachusetts. They had one son, Stephen Leo Hughes Jr.

Hughes died on March 25, 1939, following a long illness. He was buried in Holyhood Cemetery in Brookline, Massachusetts.
