= Bill Cook =

Canadian ice hockey player and coach (1895–1986)

- Hockey Hall of Fame, 1952
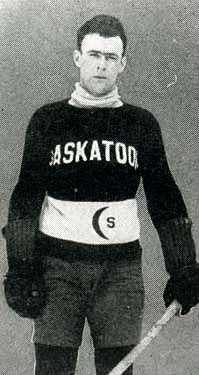
- Cook with the Saskatoon Crescents in the 1920s
- Born: October 8, 1895 Brantford, Ontario, Canada
- Died: May 5, 1986 (aged 90) Kingston, Ontario, Canada
- Height: 5 ft 10 in (178 cm)
- Weight: 172 lb (78 kg; 12 st 4 lb)
- Position: Right wing
- Shot: Right
- Played for: Saskatoon Crescents; New York Rangers
- Playing career: 1922–1937

William Osser Xavier Cook (October 8, 1895 – May 5, 1986) was a Canadian professional ice hockey player who was a right winger for the Saskatoon Crescents of the Western Canada Hockey League (WCHL) and the New York Rangers of the National Hockey League (NHL). A prolific scorer, Cook led the WCHL in goals twice and the NHL three times. He was named an all-star seven times between the two leagues. Known as "The Original Ranger", Cook was the first captain of the New York Rangers, scored the first goal in franchise history and led the team to two Stanley Cup championships.

Turning to coaching following his playing career, Cook led the Cleveland Barons to two Calder Cup championships and the Minneapolis Millers to a United States Hockey League championship. He coached the New York Rangers during the 1951–52 NHL season until his retirement in 1953. Cook was inducted into the Hockey Hall of Fame in 1952 and Canada's Sports Hall of Fame in 1975.

== Early life ==
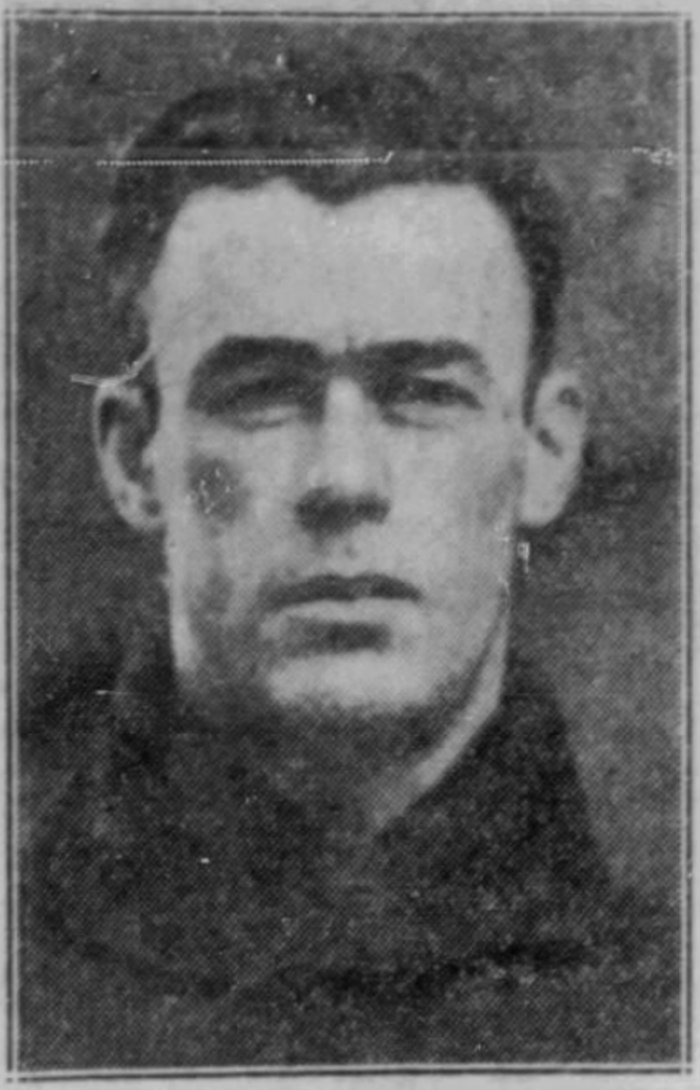
Cook with the Sault Ste. Marie Greyhounds

Cook was born on October 8, 1895, in Brantford, Ontario. He was a middle child of a large family, and the eldest of three sons, preceding his brothers Frederick ("Bun") and Alexander ("Bud"). The family moved to Kingston, Ontario, where he learned to skate on the Rideau Canal. He joined the Kingston Frontenacs' junior hockey team in 1913 and played for two seasons before his career was interrupted by the First World War.

He enlisted in the Canadian Expeditionary Force in December 1915, and served with the 50th Battery, Canadian Field Artillery for nearly two years in France and another year at the Belgian front. Arriving in England in April 1916, Cook was initially promoted to acting Bombardier, but reverted to Gunner so he could serve on the front earlier, and was sent there in July 1916. Cook participated in several engagements, including at Ypres, the Somme, Vimy Ridge and Hill 70. With the end of the First World War Cook was sent to Archangel in northern Russia, part of the allied intervention in the Russian Civil War. He would spend 8 months in Russia, and was awarded the Military Medal for his services in April 1919. He returned to Canada in July 1919 and was discharged shortly after.

Upon his return from the war, Cook rejoined the Frontenacs for one season before joining the Sault Ste. Marie Greyhounds in 1920. He led the Northern Ontario Hockey Association (NOHA) in both goals, 12, and points, 19, while the Greyhounds won the NOHA championship. He won the scoring title again in 1921–22 with 20 goals and 28 points.

== Playing career ==
=== Saskatoon Crescents ===
Spurning offers from National Hockey League (NHL) teams to turn professional in the eastern league, Cook moved to Saskatchewan, where he had been granted land for his service in the war. The Calgary Tigers of the Western Canada Hockey League (WCHL) attempted to recruit him for the 1922–23 season but failed to sign him. Instead, he joined the Saskatoon Crescents. He recorded 25 points in 30 games in his first professional season.

Returning to Saskatoon in 1923–24, Cook led the WCHL with 26 goals and 40 points. He was named the all-star right wing for the first of three consecutive seasons. He scored 22 goals in 1924–25. The WCHL rebranded itself the Western Hockey League (WHL) and the Crescents became the Sheiks in 1925–26. Cook again led in both goals and points with 31 and 44 respectively, and had become known as the best right wing in hockey.

=== New York Rangers ===
The WHL had run into financial difficulty in its final seasons, and after 1926, ceased operations. The Montreal Maroons intended to sign both Cook and his brother Bun to join their team for the 1926–27 NHL season. While the team's manager waited in Montreal to meet the brothers, Conn Smythe, manager of the newly formed New York Rangers, travelled to Winnipeg to reach the pair first. Smythe signed both Cook brothers for $12,000. Bill Cook was officially the first player signed by the Rangers, and was named the team's first captain. The Cook brothers joined Frank Boucher to form the "Bread Line", one of the early NHL's most prolific scoring lines.

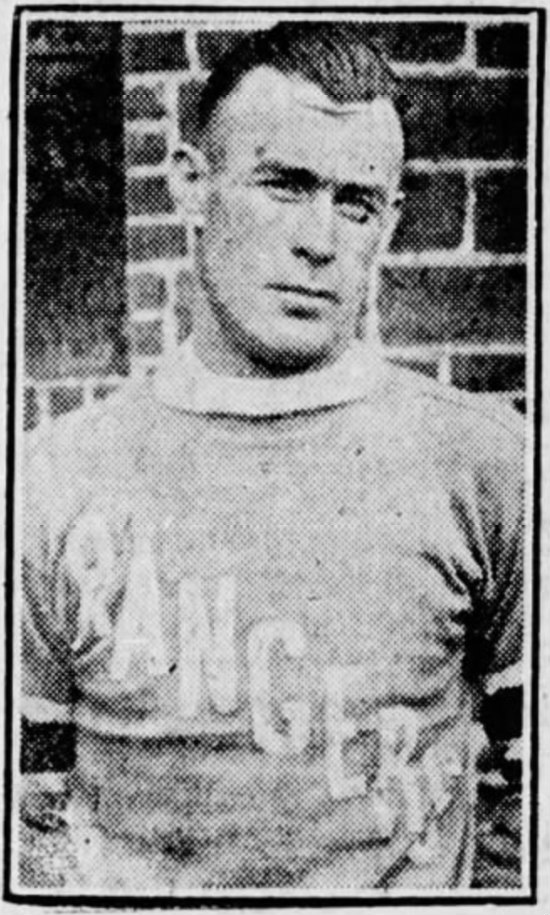
Cook with the New York Rangers in 1926–27

The Rangers made their NHL debut on November 16, 1926, against the Maroons. Cook scored the franchise's first goal, which also stood up as the winner, in a 1–0 victory. Appearing in 44 games, he led the league in both goals, 33, and points, 37. He finished as the runner-up to Herb Gardiner of the Montreal Canadiens for the Hart Trophy as the NHL's most valuable player. The Rangers finished first in the American Division, but were eliminated by the Boston Bruins in the playoffs. Cook recorded 24 points in 1927–28, the seventh highest total in the league. The Rangers again qualified for the playoffs, where they defeated the Pittsburgh Pirates, Boston Bruins and Montreal Maroons to win the franchise's first Stanley Cup championship. The Bread Line scored every Rangers goal in the 1928 Stanley Cup Final.

Twenty-three points in 1928–29 again placed Cook seventh in the league. The Rangers defeated the New York Americans to reach the 1929 Stanley Cup Final, but were defeated by the Montreal Canadiens. Cook led the Rangers and finished fourth in league scoring in 1929–30 and 1930–31 with 59 and 42 points respectively. In 1931, he was named to the NHL's inaugural All-Star team at right wing. It was the first of four consecutive appearances; he was placed on the first team in 1931, 1932 and 1933, and on the second team in 1934. Cook's 34 goals in 1931–32 tied Charlie Conacher for the league lead. The Rangers won the American Division title, and after defeating the Canadians, faced Conacher's Toronto Maple Leafs in the 1932 Stanley Cup Final. Toronto swept the series with three consecutive victories.

Cook was again the top scorer in 1932–33, leading the NHL in both goals, 28, and points, 50. At 36 years, 5 months old, Cook was the oldest player in NHL history to win a scoring title until 2013 when Martin St. Louis of the Tampa Bay Lightning led the NHL in scoring at the age of 37. The Rangers reached the 1933 Stanley Cup Final against the Toronto Maple Leafs. Cook scored the winning goal in the second game, then scored the championship winning goal, in overtime, in the fourth game. It was the first overtime power play goal in NHL playoff history. The trophy was not available on the night the Rangers won, leading the series to become known as the "Forgotten Cup". Cook accepted the Stanley Cup on behalf of his team in November of that year, seven months after the Rangers victory.

After scoring only 13 goals in 1933–34, Cook improved to 20 goals in 1934–35. In a 7–5 victory over the Maple Leafs on January 29, 1935, the Bread line scored four goals and five assists to reach a combined 1,000 points as a unit over their nine seasons together. The Bread Line was broken up in 1935–36 when Bun was forced out of the Rangers lineup by illness. Bill Cook scored just seven goals that season, and at the age of 40, scored one goal in 21 games before retiring as a player during the 1936–37 season. He is believed to be the first NHL player to score a goal after turning 40.

== Coaching career ==
Turning to coaching, Cook took over as the manager of the Cleveland Barons in the International-American Hockey League (IAHL) in the 1937–38 season. He inherited a team that had struggled the season before and led it to a respectable season, winning 34 of 50 games played combined between the regular season and playoffs. Cook was pressed into service as a player as a result of injuries. His team was able to dress only 10 of 17 players in the deciding game of the Barons' playoff series against the Syracuse Stars. Cook played a regular shift in the game, but the Barons lost, 3–2, in the fourth overtime period.

The Barons finished fifth overall in the IAHL standings in 1938–39, but defeated the Springfield Indians and Providence Reds to reach the league championship series against the Philadelphia Ramblers. They won the best-of-five championship three games to one to claim the Calder Cup. Cook coached the Barons to a second Calder Cup in 1940–41, defeating the Hershey Bears in the final. Cook remained behind the Barons' bench until the conclusion of the 1942–43 American Hockey League (AHL) season. He then turned coaching duties over to his brother Bun, but remained the team's general manager.

Cook left the Barons to join the Minneapolis Millers of the United States Hockey League (USHL) in 1947. He coached the team for three seasons, leading the team to the Paul W. Loudon Trophy as league champions in 1949–50. He moved on to coach the Denver Falcons, also of the USHL, in 1950–51 then the Saskatoon Quakers of the Pacific Coast Hockey League (PHCL) the following season. Cook left the Quakers midway through the season when asked by Frank Boucher, general manager of the New York Rangers, to return to the NHL club as its head coach. He coached the final 47 games of the Rangers' 1951–52 season, winning 17, losing 22 and tying 8. He remained behind the Rangers bench in 1952–53, but the Rangers missed the playoffs after winning only 17 of 70 games. Cook was replaced as coach following the season as Boucher named himself head coach. Cook then retired from hockey.

== Legacy ==
A prolific scorer, Cook scored 317 goals and 508 points in 591 games in his 15-year professional career. Known as "The Original Ranger", he led the team in goals six times. He was regarded as being the greatest right wing in the game's history when he retired, an opinion former teammate Frank Boucher retained many years later: "Bill was the finest all-round player in Ranger history. And he's my choice as the best right winger hockey ever knew – despite the fact that others disagree and give their votes to Rocket Richard or Gordie Howe. I say Cook topped them both." Cook was inducted into the Hockey Hall of Fame in 1952, and Canada's Sports Hall of Fame in 1975.

A popular former Ranger, Cook participated in the closing of the old Madison Square Garden and the opening of the new facility in 1968. In recognition of his scoring the first Rangers goal in the old Garden, he was asked to "score" the first goal in the new facility as part of the opening ceremony for the new. In 1986, he was presented with the Rangers' Alumni Association award, the first former Ranger to receive the award through a vote of alumni membership. The Hockey News ranked Cook as the 44th greatest player in NHL history, and highest Ranger on the list, in its 1998 book The Top 100 NHL Players of All Time.

== Personal life ==
Accepting a land grant from the federal government, Cook settled in Saskatchewan following the First World War, taking a half section of land adjacent to a similar holding of his brother Bun's. He established his farm near Lac Vert, Saskatchewan, hunted and played baseball during hockey off-seasons. He later returned to Kingston, Ontario, where he continued to farm and was nearly killed when one of his bulls gored him.

Cook was married and had three children. His grandson, Paul Hoynes, is a beat writer for the Cleveland Guardians of Major League Baseball.

Cook died of cancer in Kingston on May 5, 1986. He was buried at St. Mary's Catholic Cemetery in Kingston, near Bun.

== Career statistics ==
=== Regular season and playoffs ===
			Regular season					Playoffs
Season	Team	League	GP	G	A	Pts	PIM	GP	G	A	Pts	PIM
1914–15	Kingston Frontenacs	OHA	—	—	—	—	—	—	—	—	—	—
1914–15	Kingston Frontenacs	OHA Sr	—	—	—	—	—	—	—	—	—	—
1919–20	Kingston Frontenacs	OHA Sr	—	—	—	—	—	—	—	—	—	—
1920–21	Sault Ste. Marie Greyhounds	NOHA	9	12	7	19	48	5	5	1	6	—
1920–21	Sault Ste. Marie Greyhounds	NMHL	12	12	6	18	—	—	—	—	—	—
1921–22	Sault Ste. Marie Greyhounds	NMHL	12	20	8	28	—	—	—	—	—	—
1921–22	Sault Ste. Marie Greyhounds	NOHA	8	7	5	12	38	2	1	1	2	2
1922–23	Saskatoon Crescents	WCHL	30	9	16	25	19	—	—	—	—	—
1923–24	Saskatoon Crescents	WCHL	30	26	14	40	20	—	—	—	—	—
1924–25	Saskatoon Crescents	WCHL	27	22	10	32	79	2	0	0	0	4
1925–26	Saskatoon Sheiks	WHL	30	31	13	44	26	2	2	0	2	26
1926–27	New York Rangers	NHL	44	33	4	37	58	2	1	0	1	6
1927–28	New York Rangers	NHL	43	18	6	24	42	9	2	3	5	26
1928–29	New York Rangers	NHL	43	15	8	23	41	6	0	0	0	6
1929–30	New York Rangers	NHL	44	29	30	59	56	4	0	1	1	11
1930–31	New York Rangers	NHL	43	30	12	42	39	4	3	0	3	4
1931–32	New York Rangers	NHL	48	34	14	48	33	7	3	3	6	2
1932–33	New York Rangers	NHL	48	28	22	50	51	8	3	2	5	4
1933–34	New York Rangers	NHL	48	13	13	26	21	2	0	0	0	2
1934–35	New York Rangers	NHL	48	21	15	36	23	4	1	2	3	7
1935–36	New York Rangers	NHL	44	7	10	17	16	—	—	—	—	—
1936–37	New York Rangers	NHL	21	1	4	5	6	—	—	—	—	—
1937–38	Cleveland Barons	IAHL	5	0	0	0	5	1	0	0	0	0
WCHL totals			117	88	53	141	144	4	2	0	2	30
NHL totals			474	229	138	367	386	46	13	11	24	68

=== NHL Coaching career ===
Season	Team	League	Regular season						Postseason
Season	Team	League	G	W	L	T	Pct	Division rank	Result
1951–52	New York Rangers	NHL	47	17	22	8	.447	5th overall	Did not qualify
1952–53	New York Rangers	NHL	70	17	37	16	.357	6th overall	Did not qualify
NHL totals			117	34	59	24	.393		

== See also ==
- List of NHL players who spent their entire career with one franchise

== Bibliography ==
- Dryden, Steve, ed. (1997), The Top 100 NHL Players of All Time, Toronto: McClelland & Stewart, ISBN 0-7710-4176-4
- Duplacey, James; Zweig, Eric (2010), Official Guide to the Players of the Hockey Hall of Fame, Richmond Hill, Ontario: Firefly Books, ISBN 978-1-55407-662-8
- MacLeod, Alan Livingstone (2018), From Rinks to Regiments: Hockey Hall-of-Famers and the Great War, Victoria, British Columbia: Heritage House, ISBN 978-1-77203-268-0
- McFarlane, Brian (1990), One Hundred Years of Hockey, Toronto: Summerhill Press, ISBN 0-929091-26-4
- McFarlane, Brian (1997), The Rangers, Toronto: Stoddart Publishing, ISBN 0-7737-3047-8
- Podnieks, Andrew (2003), Players: The ultimate A–Z guide of everyone who has ever played in the NHL, Toronto: Doubleday Canada, ISBN 0-385-25999-9

Sporting positions
Preceded by Position created	New York Rangers captain 1926–37	Succeeded by Art Coulter
Preceded by Neil Colville	Head coach of the New York Rangers; 1951–53	Succeeded by Frank Boucher
Awards and achievements
Preceded by Harvey Jackson	NHL Scoring Champion; 1933	Succeeded by Charlie Conacher
Preceded by Nels Stewart	NHL Scoring Champion; 1927	Succeeded by Howie Morenz
