= 1927–28 NHL season =

Professional ice hockey league season

- League: National Hockey League
- Sport: Ice hockey
- Duration: November 15, 1927 – April 14, 1928
- Games: 44
- Teams: 10

Regular season
- Season champions: Montreal Canadiens
- Season MVP: Howie Morenz (Canadiens)
- Top scorer: Howie Morenz (Canadiens)
- Canadian Division champions: Montreal Canadiens
- American Division champions: Boston Bruins

Stanley Cup
- Champions: New York Rangers
- Runners-up: Montreal Maroons

NHL seasons
- ← 1926–27 1928–29 →

The 1927–28 NHL season was the 11th season of the National Hockey League. Ten teams played 44 games each. This was the first full season that the Toronto club used the Toronto Maple Leafs name following ownership changes in February 1927. The New York Rangers won the Stanley Cup beating the Montreal Maroons, becoming the first NHL team based in the United States to win it.

== League business ==
The O'Brien Cup, which used to go to the National Hockey Association (NHA), later the NHL league champion, would now go to the winner of the Canadian Division. The Prince of Wales Trophy, first awarded to the winner of the first game at Madison Square Garden, and later the NHL league champion, would now go to the winner of the American division.

The first indications that the Ottawa Senators were in financial trouble surfaced when they asked the league for a bigger share of road game income. Though the league entertained the Senators suggestion, the Senators did not receive this income. It was decided by the Ottawa management to sell star right wing Hooley Smith to the Montreal Maroons for an undisclosed amount of money ($22,500 it was believed). At the same time, right wing Punch Broadbent returned to Ottawa.

The Toronto Maple Leafs introduced new sweaters of blue and white, changing from the former green logo on white uniform. They are the first team in the NHL to have a set of white uniforms and a set of dark uniforms.

=== Rule changes ===
The league changed the rule for substitution, allowing "on the fly" changes, as long as the player going off is on the bench before the substitute goes on.

The league implemented new measures to increase scoring. The blue lines were introduced, dividing the rink into three zones: defending, neutral and attacking. Teams with possession in their defending zone could now pass the puck forward, and both teams could pass the puck forward in the neutral zone, although forward passing across the blue lines was still disallowed. New penalties were given for picking up the puck; and for clearing the puck out of play. Goalie leg pads were reduced in width to ten inches from twelve and goalies were disallowed from travelling more than four feet with the puck. However, the new changes did not improve scoring, as the average number of goals per game decreased to 3.8, from 4.0. A new ten-minute sudden-death overtime period was introduced to resolve games tied after 60 minutes. This was also ineffective, and the number of tie games doubled from 36 to 74.

== Arena changes ==
The Detroit Cougars moved from Border Cities Arena in Windsor, Ontario to Olympia Stadium in Detroit.

== Regular season ==
The Chicago Black Hawks fired coach Pete Muldoon before the season, and coaching was split between Hugh Lehman and Barney Stanley. The Black Hawks finished last, recording only seven wins. The firing of Muldoon prompted him to publicly put "a curse" (known as the "curse of the Muldoons") on the Black Hawks, stating that the team would never win the NHL pennant. The Black Hawks would not place first in the NHL until the 1966–67 season.

The Ottawa Senators, the smallest market in the league, were affected by franchises in the U.S. and sold their star right wing Hooley Smith to the Montreal Maroons for $22,500 plus the return of right wing Punch Broadbent, followed by the sale of defenceman Edwin Gorman to Toronto.

Howie Morenz, the NHL's top drawing card, dominated the scoring race and was runaway winner of the Hart Trophy. He scored 33 goals and led the league in assists as well. Despite Ottawa's financial difficulties, Alex Connell, Ottawa goalkeeper, set an all-time record with six consecutive shutouts. His record shutout sequence reached 460 minutes and 59 seconds without being scored on.

Toronto, now the Maple Leafs, showed power early on and it looked like they would make the playoffs. However, injuries to Hap Day and Bill Carson doomed the team, and the Leafs sagged to fourth, out of the playoffs for the third straight year. It would take another 80 years until the Leafs missed the playoffs three straight times again.

Thanks to the great play of Eddie Shore and goaltender Hal Winkler, who tied with Connell for the leader in shutouts with 15, the Boston Bruins finished first for the first time in the American Division, while the Canadiens, who were running away with the Canadian Division at mid-season, slumped after an injury to Pit Lepine but managed to hold onto first place at season's end.

=== Final standings ===
Canadian Division
	GP	W	L	T	GF	GA	PIM	Pts
**Montreal Canadiens**	44	26	11	7	116	48	496	59
**Montreal Maroons**	44	24	14	6	96	77	549	54
**Ottawa Senators**	44	20	14	10	78	57	483	50
Toronto Maple Leafs	44	18	18	8	89	88	436	44
New York Americans	44	11	27	6	63	128	563	28

American Division
	GP	W	L	T	GF	GA	PIM	Pts
**Boston Bruins**	44	20	13	11	77	70	558	51
**New York Rangers**	44	19	16	9	94	79	462	47
**Pittsburgh Pirates**	44	19	17	8	67	76	395	46
Detroit Cougars	44	19	19	6	88	79	395	44
Chicago Black Hawks	44	7	34	3	68	134	375	17

Note: W = Wins, L = Losses, T = Ties, Pts = Points, GF= Goals For, GA = Goals Against, PIM = Penalties in minutes
Note: Teams that qualified for the playoffs are highlighted in bold

== Playoffs ==
In the Canadian Division, the Montreal Maroons beat the Ottawa Senators and then went to the limit against the Canadiens before Russell Oatman put the Maroons into the finals with a goal in overtime.

In the American Division, the New York Rangers knocked off the Pittsburgh Pirates in a rough series, and then beat Boston to go to the finals against the Montreal Maroons.

=== Playoff bracket ===
The top three teams in each division qualified for the playoffs. In the first round, the second-place team in each division played against the third-place team from their division. Each division winner received a first round bye, then met the first round winner from their division in the second round. The two divisional playoff winners then advanced to the Stanley Cup Finals. In the first two rounds, teams competed in a two-game total-goals series. The Stanley Cup Finals was instead competed in a best-of-five format.

Quarterfinals
C2	Mtl Maroons	3G
C3	Ottawa	1G
A2	NY Rangers	6G
A3	Pittsburgh	4G

Semifinals
C1	Mtl Canadiens	2G
C2	Mtl Maroons	3G
A1	Boston	2G
A2	NY Rangers	5G

Finals
C2	Mtl Maroons	2
A2	NY Rangers	3

=== Quarterfinals ===
==== (A2) New York Rangers vs. (A3) Pittsburgh Pirates ====
March 27	Pittsburgh Pirates	0–4	New York Rangers	Madison Square Garden III	Recap
No scoring		First period	04:13 – Frank Boucher (1); 14:36 – Bun Cook (1); 18:34 – Alex Gray (1)
No scoring		Second period	04:21 – Ching Johnson (1)
No scoring		Third period	No scoring
Roy Worters		Goalie stats	Lorne Chabot

March 29	Pittsburgh Pirates	4–2	New York Rangers	Madison Square Garden III	Recap
Marty Burke (1) – 14:04		First period	03:03 – Clarence Abel (1)
Rodger Smith (1) – 07:40		Second period	No scoring
Rodger Smith (2) – 13:47; Baldy Cotton (1) – 18:57		Third period	10:40 – Murray Murdoch (1)
Roy Worters		Goalie stats	Lorne Chabot

New York won series on total goals 6–4

==== (C2) Montreal Maroons vs. (C3) Ottawa Senators ====
March 27	Montreal Maroons	1–0	Ottawa Senators	Ottawa Auditorium	Recap
No scoring		First period	No scoring
Joe Lamb (1) – 09:05		Second period	No scoring
No scoring		Third period	No scoring
Alec Connell		Goalie stats	Clint Benedict

March 29	Ottawa Senators	1–2	Montreal Maroons	Montreal Forum	Recap
No scoring		First period	10:00 – Babe Siebert (1)
No scoring		Second period	05:00 – Hooley Smith (1)
Hec Kilrea (1) – 02:00		Third period	No scoring
Clint Benedict		Goalie stats	Alec Connell

Montreal won series on total goals 3–1

=== Semifinals ===
==== (A1) Boston Bruins vs. (A2) New York Rangers ====
March 31	Boston Bruins	1–1	New York Rangers	Madison Square Garden III	Recap
No scoring		First period	No scoring
No scoring		Second period	No scoring
Harry Oliver (1) – 03:00		Third period	01:48 – Frank Boucher (2)
Hal Winkler		Goalie stats	Lorne Chabot

April 3	New York Rangers	4–1	Boston Bruins	Boston Arena	Recap
Bill Cook (1) – 19:30		First period	No scoring
Murray Murdoch (2) – 11:23; Bun Cook (2) – 16:18; Frank Boucher (3) – 17:32		Second period	No scoring
No scoring		Third period	19:30 – Harry Oliver (2)
Lorne Chabot		Goalie stats	Hal Winkler

New York won series on total goals 5–2

==== (C1) Montreal Canadiens vs. (C2) Montreal Maroons ====
March 31	Montreal Canadiens	2–2	Montreal Maroons	Montreal Forum	Recap
Albert Leduc (1) – 10:10		First period	No scoring
Art Gagne (1) – 03:55		Second period	13:55 – Jimmy Ward (1); 15:00 – Hooley Smith (2)
No scoring		Third period	No scoring
George Hainsworth		Goalie stats	Clint Benedict

April 3	Montreal Maroons	1–0	OT	Montreal Canadiens	Montreal Forum	Recap
No scoring		First period		No scoring
No scoring		Second period		No scoring
No scoring		Third period		No scoring
Russell Oatman (1) – 08:22		First overtime period		No scoring
Clint Benedict		Goalie stats		George Hainsworth

Montreal Maroons won series on total goals 3–2

=== Stanley Cup Finals ===
The circus knocked the Rangers out of Madison Square Garden, and all games were played in the Montreal Forum, even though Boston offered to host the Rangers. The Maroons won game one 2–0, with Nels Stewart and goaltender Clint Benedict the stars.

Drama took over in game two when Nels Stewart fired a hard shot that struck New York goaltender Lorne Chabot in the eye. He could not continue, and the Rangers needed a goaltender. However, when coach Eddie Gerard refused to let the Rangers use Alex Connell or minor league goaltender Hugh McCormick, Lester Patrick, Ranger coach, in anger, decided to don the pads himself. The Rangers then body-blasted any Maroon who got near Patrick. Bill Cook scored, putting the Rangers ahead 1–0, but Nels Stewart was not to be denied and scored, tying the game. In overtime, Frank Boucher got the winner for the Rangers and they carried Patrick, tears streaming down his eyes, off the ice. Patrick stopped 17 of 18 shots he faced.

Joe Miller, New York Americans goalie, was allowed to take Chabot's place in goal and he played well in a 2–0 loss in game three. However, Frank Boucher starred as the Rangers took the next two games, and the Stanley Cup. Drama almost took place in the final game when Miller was badly cut on a shot, but he was able to continue. The crowd became unruly at times and referee Mike Rodden took abuse for disallowed goals by Maroon players. Even NHL president Frank Calder was a target of some fans for not intervening. The Rangers became the second American team to win the Cup and the first NHL American team to do so. In addition, the Rangers became the first opposing team to win the Stanley Cup at the Montreal Forum which was only repeated in 1989

April 5	New York Rangers	0–2	Montreal Maroons	Montreal Forum	Recap
No scoring		First period	No scoring
No scoring		Second period	10:48 – Red Dutton (1)
No scoring		Third period	05:56 – Merlyn Phillips (1)
Lorne Chabot		Goalie stats	Clint Benedict

April 7	New York Rangers	2–1	OT	Montreal Maroons	Montreal Forum	Recap
No scoring		First period		No scoring
No scoring		Second period		No scoring
Bill Cook (1) – 00:30		Third period		18:51 – Nels Stewart (1)
Frank Boucher (4) – 07:05		First overtime period		No scoring
Lorne Chabot, Lester Patrick		Goalie stats		Clint Benedict

April 10	New York Rangers	0–2	Montreal Maroons	Montreal Forum	Recap
No scoring		First period	No scoring
No scoring		Second period	09:00 – Nels Stewart (2)
No scoring		Third period	17:20 – Babe Siebert (2)
Joe Miller		Goalie stats	Clint Benedict

April 12	New York Rangers	1–0	Montreal Maroons	Montreal Forum	Recap
No scoring		First period	No scoring
Frank Boucher (5) – 13:13		Second period	No scoring
No scoring		Third period	No scoring
Joe Miller		Goalie stats	Clint Benedict

April 14	New York Rangers	2–1	Montreal Maroons	Montreal Forum	Recap
Frank Boucher (6) – 17:05		First period	No scoring
No scoring		Second period	No scoring
Frank Boucher (7) – 15:16		Third period	17:16 – Merlyn Phillips (2)
Joe Miller		Goalie stats	Clint Benedict

New York won series 3–2

== Awards ==
The terms for awarding the O'Brien Cup and the Prince of Wales Trophy were changed to honour the top finisher in each of the NHL's divisions. Howie Morenz won the Hart Trophy, the first of three times he would be named most valuable player. Frank Boucher won the Lady Byng, the first of seven times he would win the award. George Hainsworth won the Vezina Trophy for the second consecutive year.

1927–28 NHL awards
Hart Trophy: (Most valuable player)	Howie Morenz, Montreal Canadiens
Lady Byng Trophy: (Excellence and sportsmanship)	Frank Boucher, New York Rangers
O'Brien Cup: (Canadian Division champions)	Montreal Canadiens
Prince of Wales Trophy: (American Division champions)	Boston Bruins
Vezina Trophy: (Fewest goals allowed)	George Hainsworth, Montreal Canadiens

== Player statistics ==
=== Scoring leaders ===
Note: GP = Games played; G = Goals; A = Assists; Pts = Points

Player	Team	GP	G	A	Pts
Howie Morenz	Montreal Canadiens	43	33	18	51
Aurel Joliat	Montreal Canadiens	44	28	11	39
Frank Boucher	New York Rangers	44	23	12	35
George Hay	Detroit Cougars	42	22	13	35
Nels Stewart	Montreal Maroons	41	27	7	34
Art Gagne	Montreal Canadiens	44	20	10	30
Bun Cook	New York Rangers	44	14	14	28
Bill Carson	Toronto Maple Leafs	32	20	6	26
Frank Finnigan	Ottawa Senators	38	20	5	25
Bill Cook	New York Rangers	43	18	6	24
Duke Keats	Detroit Cougars/Chicago Black Hawks	38	14	10	24

Source: NHL

=== Leading goaltenders ===
Note: GP = Games played; Mins = Minutes played; GA = Goals against; SO = Shut outs; GAA = Goals against average

Player	Team	GP	Mins	GA	SO	GAA
George Hainsworth	Montreal Canadiens	44	2730	48	13	1.05
Alex Connell	Ottawa Senators	44	2760	57	15	1.24
Hal Winkler	Boston Bruins	44	2780	70	15	1.51
Roy Worters	Pittsburgh Pirates	44	2740	76	11	1.66
Clint Benedict	Montreal Maroons	44	2690	76	6	1.70

Source: hockey-reference.com

== Coaches ==
=== American Division ===
- Boston Bruins: Art Ross
- Chicago Black Hawks: Barney Stanley and Hughie Lehman
- Detroit Cougars: Jack Adams
- New York Rangers: Lester Patrick
- Pittsburgh Pirates: Odie Cleghorn

=== Canadian Division ===
- Montreal Canadiens: Cecil Hart
- Montreal Maroons: Eddie Gerard
- New York Americans: Shorty Green
- Ottawa Senators: Dave Gill
- Toronto Maple Leafs: Conn Smythe

== Debuts ==
The following is a list of players of note who played their first NHL game in 1927–28 (listed with their first team, asterisk(*) marks debut in playoffs):

- Dit Clapper, Boston Bruins
- Norman Gainor, Boston Bruins
- Cy Wentworth, Chicago Black Hawks
- Charlie Gardiner, Chicago Black Hawks
- Larry Aurie, Detroit Cougars
- Marty Burke, Montreal Canadiens
- Jimmy Ward, Montreal Maroons
- Joe Lamb, Montreal Maroons
- Marty Barry, New York Americans
- Allan Shields, Ottawa Senators
- Joe Primeau, Toronto Maple Leafs

== Last games ==
The following is a list of players of note that played their last game in the NHL in 1927–28 (listed with their last team):* Denotes last game was in the playoffs.

- Sprague Cleghorn, Boston Bruins
- Corb Denneny, Chicago Black Hawks
- Frank Foyston, Detroit Cougars
- Jack Walker, Detroit Cougars
- Billy Boucher, New York Americans
- Odie Cleghorn, Pittsburgh Pirates
- Lester Patrick, New York Rangers*

== See also ==
- 1927–28 NHL transactions
- List of Stanley Cup champions
- Ice hockey at the 1928 Winter Olympics
- Prairie Hockey League
- List of pre-NHL seasons
- 1927 in sports
- 1928 in sports
