= Alex Gray (ice hockey) =

Canadian ice hockey player

- Born: June 21, 1898 Glasgow, Scotland, UK
- Died: April 10, 1986 (aged 87)
- Height: 5 ft 10 in (178 cm)
- Weight: 170 lb (77 kg; 12 st 2 lb)
- Position: Right wing
- Shot: Right
- Played for: New York Rangers; Toronto Maple Leafs
- Playing career: 1921–1933

Alexander Haim Gray (June 21, 1898 – April 10, 1986) was a Canadian ice hockey right winger who played 50 games for the New York Rangers and the Toronto Maple Leafs from 1927 to 1933. With the Rangers he won the Stanley Cup in 1928.

== Early life ==
Although born in Glasgow, Scotland, United Kingdom, Gray grew up in Thunder Bay, Ontario. He played for five years with the Port Arthur Ports of the Thunder Bay Senior Hockey League (TBSHL). According to Legends of Hockey, "he topped the league in goal scoring three times and was its most penalized player twice."

== Playing career ==
In 1928 Gray signed with the New York Rangers of the National Hockey League. Wearing jersey number 2, he played on a line with Paul Thompson and Murray Murdoch. He helped the Rangers win the Stanley Cup that spring.

After his rookie season in New York he was involved in a big trade with the Toronto Maple Leafs, He was traded along with Lorne Chabot for Melville "Butch" Keeling and John Ross Roach.

He played a total of 13 games for the Maple Leafs in the 1928–29 season (7 regular season games and 4 playoff games). After 1 season in Toronto he was sent to the minors where he spent the remainder of his career.

== Career statistics ==
=== Regular season and playoffs ===
			Regular season					Playoffs
Season	Team	League	GP	G	A	Pts	PIM	GP	G	A	Pts	PIM
1920–21	Port Arthur Bruins	TBJHL	—	—	—	—	—	—	—	—	—	—
1921–22	Eveleth Rangers	USAHA	—	—	—	—	—	—	—	—	—	—
1922–23	Port Arthur Ports	TBSHL	14	18	8	26	10	2	0	1	1	0
1923–24	Port Arthur Ports	TBSHL	14	20	5	25	4	2	1	1	2	0
1924–25	Port Arthur Ports	TBSHL	20	17	7	34	9	10	11	4	15	4
1925–26	Port Arthur Ports	TBSHL	18	12	9	21	14	3	0	0	0	0
1925–26	Port Arthur Ports	Al-Cup	—	—	—	—	—	6	4	1	5	0
1926–27	Port Arthur Ports	TBSHL	19	27	6	33	31	9	1	0	1	0
1927–28	New York Rangers	NHL	43	7	1	8	28	9	1	0	1	0
1928–29	Toronto Maple Leafs	NHL	7	0	0	0	2	—	—	—	—	—
1928–29	Toronto Ravinas	Can-Pro	37	11	3	14	51	2	3	0	3	4
1929–30	Cleveland Indians	IHL	42	21	11	32	59	6	4	3	7	4
1930–31	Cleveland Indians	IHL	48	29	8	37	55	6	4	2	6	6
1931–32	Cleveland Indians	IHL	48	16	10	26	35	—	—	—	—	—
1932–33	Cleveland Indians	IHL	39	7	8	15	15	—	—	—	—	—
NHL totals			50	7	1	8	30	9	1	0	1	0

== Awards and achievements ==
- 1928 Stanley Cup Championship (NYR)

== See also ==
- List of National Hockey League players from the United Kingdom
