= Bud Cook =

Canadian ice hockey player

- Born: November 20, 1907; Kingston, Ontario, Canada
- Died: November 13, 1993 (aged 85)
- Height: 5 ft 10 in (178 cm)
- Weight: 160 lb (73 kg; 11 st 6 lb)
- Position: Centre
- Shot: Left
- Played for: Boston Bruins; Ottawa Senators; St. Louis Eagles
- Playing career: 1928–1947

Alexander Leone Lally "Bud" Cook (November 20, 1907 – November 13, 1993) was a Canadian ice hockey centre forward who played 50 games over three seasons in the National Hockey League for the Boston Bruins, Ottawa Senators, and St. Louis Eagles. He spent the majority of his career in the minor leagues, primarily in the International American Hockey League/American Hockey League, before retiring in 1947.

Bud was the younger brother of fellow professional hockey players Bill and Bun Cook, both of whom are inducted in the Hockey Hall of Fame.

== Regular season and playoffs ==
			Regular season					Playoffs
Season	Team	League	GP	G	A	Pts	PIM	GP	G	A	Pts	PIM
1924–25	Saskatoon Pats	N-SJHL	6	5	1	6	—	—	—	—	—	—
1925–26	Saskatoon Wesleys	N-SJHL	10	7	2	9	—	—	—	—	—	—
1926–27	Toronto Imperial Oil	TIHL	—	—	—	—	—	—	—	—	—	—
1927–28	Saskatoon Collegiate	N-SJHL	3	1	0	1	0	—	—	—	—	—
1928–29	Oakland Sheiks	Cal-Pro	20	13	7	20	33	—	—	—	—	—
1929–30	Oakland Sheiks	Cal-Pro	24	24	21	45	34	—	—	—	—	—
1930–31	Providence Reds	Can-Am	33	16	11	27	61	2	0	1	1	4
1931–32	Boston Bruins	NHL	28	4	4	8	14	—	—	—	—	—
1931–32	Boston Cubs	Can-Am	7	1	2	3	9	—	—	—	—	—
1932–33	Boston Cubs	Can-Am	42	16	26	42	70	7	3	4	7	10
1933–34	Ottawa Senators	NHL	18	1	0	1	8	—	—	—	—	—
1933–34	Detroit Olympics	IHL	26	11	6	17	30	6	3	0	3	17
1934–35	St. Louis Eagles	NHL	4	0	0	0	0	—	—	—	—	—
1934–35	Cleveland Falcons	IHL	37	20	21	41	50	2	1	1	2	4
1935–36	Cleveland Falcons	IHL	44	27	19	46	29	—	—	—	—	—
1936–37	Cleveland Barons	IAHL	43	20	16	36	18	—	—	—	—	—
1937–38	Cleveland Barons	IAHL	43	13	27	40	46	2	0	0	0	2
1938–39	Cleveland Barons	IAHL	—	—	—	—	—	—	—	—	—	—
1939–40	Cleveland Barons	IAHL	54	14	15	29	27	—	—	—	—	—
1940–41	Cleveland Barons	AHL	54	9	22	31	26	9	1	5	6	13
1941–42	Cleveland Barons	AHL	54	8	32	40	32	5	0	2	2	4
1942–43	Cleveland Barons	AHL	51	5	21	26	28	4	0	1	1	0
1943–44	Coast Guard Cutters	EAHL	31	16	18	34	2	8	7	5	12	6
1945–46	Oakland Oaks	PCHL	37	17	30	47	30	2	3	2	5	0
1946–47	Oakland Oaks	PCHL	—	—	—	—	—	—	—	—	—	—
IAHL/AHL totals			303	71	136	207	179	20	1	8	9	19
NHL totals			50	5	4	9	22	—	—	—	—	—
