= Frank Boucher =

Canadian ice hockey player (1901–1977)

- Hockey Hall of Fame, 1958
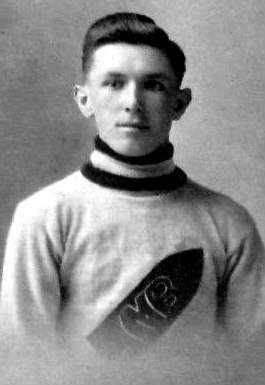
- Boucher with the Ottawa Munitions.
- Born: October 7, 1901 Ottawa, Ontario, Canada
- Died: December 12, 1977 (aged 76) Kemptville, Ontario, Canada
- Height: 5 ft 10 in (178 cm)
- Weight: 175 lb (79 kg; 12 st 7 lb)
- Position: Centre
- Shot: Left
- Played for: Ottawa Senators; Vancouver Maroons; New York Rangers
- Playing career: 1921–1938; 1943–1944

François Xavier Boucher (October 7, 1901 – December 12, 1977) was a Canadian professional ice hockey player and executive. Boucher played the forward position for the Ottawa Senators and New York Rangers in the National Hockey League (NHL) and the Vancouver Maroons in the Pacific Coast Hockey Association (PCHA) between 1921 and 1938, and again from 1943 to 1944. Boucher later became coach and the general manager of the New York Rangers between 1939 and 1955. He won the Stanley Cup three times, all with the Rangers: in 1928 and 1933 as a player, and in 1940 as the coach. Boucher was inducted into the Hockey Hall of Fame in 1958. Three of his brothers also played in the NHL, including Georges, who was also inducted into the Hockey Hall of Fame.

== Personal information ==
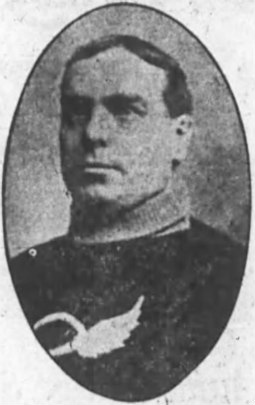
Frank's father Tom Boucher while a rugby football player at Ottawa College in the 1890s.

Born in Ottawa, Ontario, in 1901, Boucher was the youngest son in a family of six sons and two daughters born to Tom Boucher and Annie Carroll. His paternal grandfather, Antoine Boucher was French, while his other grandparents were of Irish descent. Frank Boucher was one of four brothers who played in the NHL. His brother, Georges "Buck" Boucher, played on the Ottawa Senators dynasty of the 1920s, winning four Stanley Cups. Brothers Bobby and Billy also played in the NHL. There were two other brothers, Carroll and Joseph, and two sisters, Irene and Lily. The family lived in the New Edinburgh neighbourhood of Ottawa.

Frank's nephew, Sgt. Frank Boucher, son of Georges, was the head coach of Canada's 1948 Olympic gold medal winning ice hockey team - the Ottawa RCAF Flyers.

=== Early life ===
Frank Boucher inherited some of his athletic ability from his father Tom, who played rugby football both for Ottawa College and for the Ottawa Rough Riders, winning Canadian championships in 1894, 1896, 1897 and 1901, playing alongside Tom "King" Clancy, whose son was the famous hockey player King Clancy. Boucher recalls receiving his first pair of skates at age six for Christmas, double-runners which he promptly fell from and never used again. Frank and the rest of the brothers would play games on outdoor rinks, including rinks on the Rideau River and for local New Edinburgh teams. To pay for team equipment, the team members would canvass the neighbourhood, which included Rideau Hall, where Boucher would first meet Lady Byng. Boucher attended Crichton Public School but dropped out of school at age thirteen. He took a job as an office boy with the federal government munitions department for the duration of World War I. After World War I, Boucher joined the Royal Canadian Mounted Police and moved west.

== Hockey career ==
While in Lethbridge working with the Mounties, Boucher played for the Lethbridge Vets along with Mountie teams he organized. After a year working in Banff, Alberta, Frank returned home to play for the Ottawa Senators for the 1921–22 season, where he would play with his brother George. Because he had played senior hockey out west, his playing rights belonged to the PCHA, but he was allowed to play the season for Ottawa on condition he then play for the Vancouver Maroons in following seasons. In a twist of fate, he joined the Stanley Cup champions but the Senators lost the NHL title that year to the Toronto St. Pats, who would defeat Vancouver in the Stanley Cup Finals.

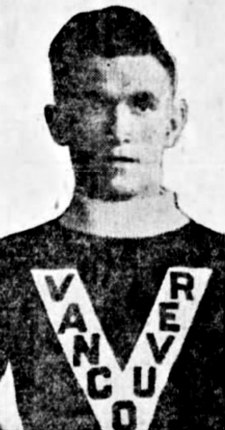
Boucher with the Vancouver Maroons in 1922–23.

Boucher played for the Maroons until 1926. The Maroons would play in the 1923 Stanley Cup Final against the Senators, losing 3-2. His brother George still played for the Senators. That series also featured brothers Cy and Corbett Denneny playing against each other, marking the first time two different sets of brothers faced each other in an NHL or Big Four championship series.

The Maroons played in the 1924 Stanley Cup playoffs against Montreal, who had the other Boucher brothers Billy and Bob, losing to the Canadiens in a best-of-three series 2–0. A highlight of the second game, a Maroons 2–1 loss, was that all goals were scored by the Bouchers, two by Billy and one by Frank.

In 1926, when the western league dissolved, his rights were sold to the Boston Bruins. He never played for the Bruins as Conn Smythe then paid the Bruins $1500 for Boucher, on the advice of Bill Cook, whom he'd played against out west, but would play with during his time with the Rangers. Boucher became a member of the original New York Rangers team.

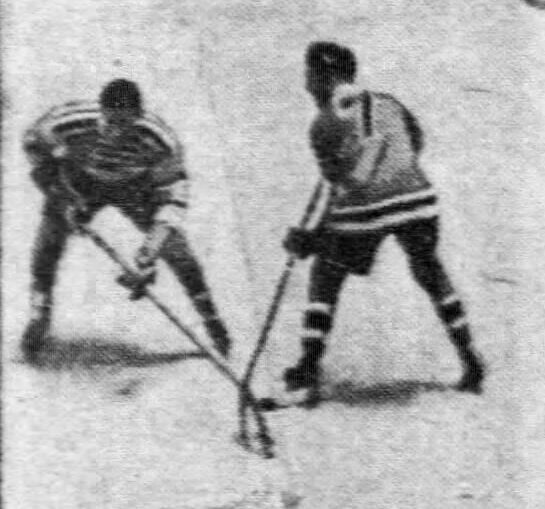
Playing for the NHL New York Rangers, Boucher takes the puck from Babe Dye of the Chicago Black Hawks in a November 30, 1926 game

Boucher played for the Rangers until he retired in 1937–38. Boucher centered the famous Bread Line with the brothers Bill and Bun Cook, and together they helped the Rangers win the Stanley Cup in 1928 and 1933, also reaching the Finals in 1932.

Frank was not only a brilliant forward, but was also one of the game's classiest. Lady Byng, wife of Viscount Byng, the Governor-General of Canada, donated a trophy to be awarded to the NHL's "most gentlemanly player." While playing for the New York Rangers, Boucher won the Lady Byng Memorial Trophy seven times in eight years. He was then given the trophy outright, and Lady Byng donated another trophy to the NHL.

The Rangers hired him to coach the New York Rovers, a minor-league team that also played at Madison Square Garden, as his apprenticeship to coaching the Rangers. When general manager Lester Patrick made the decision to retire from coaching prior to the 1939–40 season, he hired Boucher, who led his Ranger club to the last Stanley Cup. The franchise would be in existence for 68 seasons before they won a Cup without Boucher being directly involved.

After finishing first in the NHL's regular season in 1942, the Rangers lost in the playoffs to the Toronto Maple Leafs. Soon they became victims of the military draft of World War II and went into a steep decline. In 1943–44 NHL season the New York Rangers were so bad that Boucher came out of retirement for 15 games to play where he recorded 14 points; at age 42, he was the oldest position player ever to play in the NHL, a record he held until surpassed by Doug Harvey in 1968. The Rangers finished the 50 game season with only 6 wins. Between appearances in 1940 and 1972 they reached the Stanley Cup Finals only once.

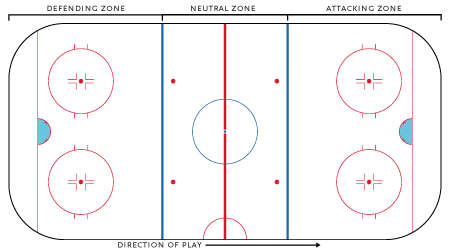
Boucher helped introduce the centre red line to the ice hockey rink during the 1943–44 season.

Boucher and Ottawa District Hockey Association executive Cecil Duncan collaborated on experiments to change the ice hockey rules. In January 1937, they tried a single blue-line at centre ice to cut down on the number of offside infractions in a game. During the 1943–44 NHL season, Boucher and Duncan introduced the centre ice red line to the hockey rink, in an effort to open up the game and allow the defending team to pass the puck out of their own zone and counter-attack quicker.

When Patrick retired, Frank took over as general manager. He got the Rangers into the playoffs in 1947–48 with his trade to get Buddy O'Connor and Frank Eddolls. He stepped down from coaching to concentrate on his manager's job and hired Lynn Patrick, Lester's son and an ex-teammate, to coach the Rangers, and Lynn came very close to winning the Stanley Cup in 1950, proving Boucher astute in hiring him as coach. But the Rangers were an aging team, and eroded. Lynn Patrick resigned to go to Boston, and neither Neil Colville nor Bill Cook, also former teammates of Boucher's, could get the Rangers into the playoffs. General John Kilpatrick, the Rangers' owner, thought about replacing Boucher, but he held off.

During the 1945–46 season, Boucher became the first coach to use two goalies regularly. Alternating Charlie Rayner and Jim Henry every game, and later, every four to six minutes, he proved the usefulness of having two goalies.

Frank went back behind the bench in 1953–54, but could not get the Rangers into the playoffs. He then hired Muzz Patrick, another son of Lester and ex-teammate, to coach the team, but the Rangers won only 17 games and missed the playoffs again. So General Kilpatrick had a talk with Frank and reluctantly expressed that Frank could not build the Rangers into a winner, and recommended Frank resign as general manager. Frank thought it over, realizing that it was better than being fired. He then typed his resignation and handed it in to the General, ending his 29-year association with the Rangers.

He was inducted into the Hockey Hall of Fame in 1958. In 1998, he was ranked number 61 on The Hockey News' list of the 100 Greatest Hockey Players. His uniform number 7 hangs in the rafters of Madison Square Garden, although it was retired for a later Ranger, Rod Gilbert.

Boucher served as commissioner of the Saskatchewan Junior Hockey League from 1959 to 1966. He proposed to establish a junior hockey league of the best twelve teams in Canada sponsored by the NHL, and to compete for a trophy at a higher tier than the Memorial Cup. Canadian Amateur Hockey Association president Art Potter and the resolutions committee were against increasing NHL influence into amateur hockey in Canada and declined to present the proposal at the semi-annual meeting. Boucher and team owners in Saskatchewan and Manitoba accused Potter and the CAHA of disregarding their concerns and favouring the Edmonton Oil Kings. Boucher threatened to withdraw the SJHL from the Memorial Cup playoffs, due to the "unfair domination of western junior hockey by the Edmonton Oil Kings", since they had the pick of all the players from Alberta and used loopholes in rules to import stronger players. The SJHL disbanded following the 1965–66 season, when five of its eight teams joined the newly formed the Canadian Major Junior Hockey League (CMJHL). Boucher served as the first commissioner of the CMJHL, now known as the Western Hockey League.

In 1974, Boucher wrote When the Rangers Were Young, a book about his experiences with the old-time Broadway Blueshirts, giving him one last moment of fame during his lifetime. He died of cancer on December 12, 1977, in the town of Kemptville, Ontario, near Ottawa, at the age of 76.

In the 2009 book 100 Ranger Greats, the authors ranked Boucher at No. 9 all-time of the 901 New York Rangers who had played during the team's first 82 seasons.

== Career statistics ==
=== Regular season and playoffs ===
| | | | Regular season | | | | | Playoffs |
| Season | Team | League | GP | G | A | Pts | PIM | GP | G | A | Pts | PIM |
|---|---|---|---|---|---|---|---|---|---|---|---|---|
| 1916–17 | Ottawa New Edinburghs | OCJHL | 9 | 11 | 0 | 11 | — | 2 | 6 | 0 | 6 | — |
| 1917–18 | Ottawa New Edinburghs | OCJHL | 4 | 1 | 0 | 1 | 0 | — | — | — | — | — |
| 1917–18 | Ottawa Munitions | OCHL | 1 | 0 | 0 | 0 | 0 | 1 | 0 | 0 | 0 | 0 |
| 1918–19 | Ottawa New Edinburghs | OCHL | 7 | 1 | 2 | 3 | 5 | — | — | — | — | — |
| 1919–20 | Lethbridge Vets | ASHL | — | — | — | — | — | — | — | — | — | — |
| 1919–20 | Lethbridge Vets | Al-Cup | — | — | — | — | — | 1 | 1 | 0 | 1 | 0 |
| 1920–21 | Banff | RMSHL | — | — | — | — | — | — | — | — | — | — |
| 1921–22 | Ottawa Senators | NHL | 24 | 8 | 2 | 10 | 4 | 1 | 0 | 0 | 0 | 0 |
| 1922–23 | Vancouver Maroons | PCHA | 28 | 11 | 9 | 20 | 2 | 2 | 0 | 1 | 1 | 2 |
| 1922–23 | Vancouver Maroons | St-Cup | — | — | — | — | — | 4 | 2 | 0 | 2 | 0 |
| 1923–24 | Vancouver Maroons | PCHA | 28 | 15 | 5 | 20 | 10 | 2 | 1 | 0 | 1 | 0 |
| 1923–24 | Vancouver Maroons | West-P | — | — | — | — | — | 3 | 1 | 0 | 1 | 0 |
| 1923–24 | Vancouver Maroons | St-Cup | — | — | — | — | — | 2 | 2 | 1 | 3 | 2 |
| 1924–25 | Vancouver Maroons | WCHL | 27 | 16 | 12 | 28 | 6 | — | — | — | — | — |
| 1925–26 | Vancouver Maroons | WHL | 29 | 15 | 7 | 22 | 14 | — | — | — | — | — |
| 1926–27 | New York Rangers | NHL | 44 | 13 | 15 | 28 | 17 | 2 | 0 | 0 | 0 | 4 |
| 1927–28 | New York Rangers | NHL | 44 | 23 | 12 | 35 | 15 | 9 | 7 | 3 | 10 | 2 |
| 1928–29 | New York Rangers | NHL | 44 | 10 | 16 | 26 | 8 | 6 | 1 | 0 | 1 | 0 |
| 1929–30 | New York Rangers | NHL | 42 | 26 | 36 | 62 | 16 | 3 | 1 | 1 | 2 | 0 |
| 1930–31 | New York Rangers | NHL | 44 | 12 | 27 | 39 | 20 | 4 | 0 | 2 | 2 | 0 |
| 1931–32 | New York Rangers | NHL | 48 | 12 | 23 | 35 | 18 | 7 | 3 | 6 | 9 | 0 |
| 1932–33 | New York Rangers | NHL | 46 | 7 | 28 | 35 | 4 | 8 | 2 | 2 | 4 | 6 |
| 1933–34 | New York Rangers | NHL | 48 | 14 | 30 | 44 | 4 | 2 | 0 | 0 | 0 | 0 |
| 1934–35 | New York Rangers | NHL | 48 | 13 | 32 | 45 | 2 | 4 | 0 | 3 | 3 | 0 |
| 1935–36 | New York Rangers | NHL | 48 | 11 | 18 | 29 | 2 | — | — | — | — | — |
| 1936–37 | New York Rangers | NHL | 44 | 7 | 13 | 20 | 5 | 9 | 2 | 3 | 5 | 0 |
| 1937–38 | New York Rangers | NHL | 18 | 0 | 1 | 1 | 2 | — | — | — | — | — |
| 1943–44 | New York Rangers | NHL | 15 | 4 | 10 | 14 | 2 | — | — | — | — | — |
| PCHA totals | | | 57 | 26 | 14 | 40 | 12 | 4 | 1 | 1 | 2 | 2 |
| WCHL/WHL totals | | | 56 | 31 | 19 | 50 | 20 | — | — | — | — | — |
| NHL totals | | | 557 | 160 | 263 | 423 | 119 | 55 | 16 | 20 | 36 | 12 |

== Coaching record ==
| Team | Year | Regular season | | | | | | | Postseason | | |
| Team | Year | G | W | L | T | Pts | Finish | W | L | Win % | Result |
|---|---|---|---|---|---|---|---|---|---|---|---|
| NYR | 1939–40 | 48 | 27 | 11 | 10 | 64 | 2nd in NHL | 8 | 4 | .667 | Won Stanley Cup (TOR) |
| NYR | 1940–41 | 48 | 21 | 19 | 8 | 50 | 4th in NHL | 1 | 2 | .333 | Lost in quarterfinals (DET) |
| NYR | 1941–42 | 48 | 29 | 17 | 2 | 60 | 1st in NHL | 2 | 4 | .333 | Lost in semifinals (TOR) |
| NYR | 1942–43 | 50 | 11 | 31 | 8 | 30 | 6th in NHL | — | — | — | Missed playoffs |
| NYR | 1943–44 | 50 | 6 | 39 | 5 | 17 | 6th in NHL | — | — | — | Missed playoffs |
| NYR | 1944–45 | 50 | 11 | 29 | 10 | 32 | 6th in NHL | — | — | — | Missed playoffs |
| NYR | 1945–46 | 50 | 13 | 28 | 9 | 35 | 6th in NHL | — | — | — | Missed playoffs |
| NYR | 1946–47 | 60 | 22 | 32 | 6 | 50 | 5th in NHL | — | — | — | Missed playoffs |
| NYR | 1947–48 | 60 | 21 | 26 | 13 | 55 | 4th in NHL | 2 | 4 | | Lost in semifinals (DET) |
| NYR | 1948–49 | 23 | 6 | 11 | 6 | 18 | (resigned) | — | — | — | — |
| NYR | 1953–54 | 40 | 14 | 20 | 6 | 34 | (resigned) | — | — | — | — |
| Total | | 527 | 181 | 263 | 83 | 445 | | 13 | 14 | .481 | 4 playoff appearances 1 Stanley Cup title |

== Sources ==
- Boucher, Frank; Trent Frayne (1973). When The Rangers Were Young. New York, New York: Dodd, Mead & Co. ISBN 0-396-06852-9.

| Preceded by Billy Burch | Winner of the Lady Byng Trophy; 1928, 1929, 1930, 1931 | Succeeded by Joe Primeau |
| Preceded by Joe Primeau | Winner of the Lady Byng Trophy; 1933, 1934, 1935 | Succeeded by Elwyn Romnes |
| Preceded by Lester Patrick | Head coach of the New York Rangers; 1939–48 | Succeeded by Lynn Patrick |
| Preceded by Bill Cook | Head coach of the New York Rangers; 1953-54 | Succeeded by Muzz Patrick |
| Preceded by Lester Patrick | General Manager of the New York Rangers; 1946–55 | Succeeded by Muzz Patrick |
