= Hector Lépine =

Canadian ice hockey player

- Born: December 7, 1897; Sainte-Anne-de-Bellevue, Quebec, Canada
- Died: March 29, 1951 (aged 53)
- Height: 5 ft 11 in (180 cm)
- Weight: 185 lb (84 kg; 13 st 3 lb)
- Position: Centre
- Shot: Right
- Played for: Montreal Canadiens
- Playing career: 1917–1927

Joseph Hector "Hec" Lépine (December 7, 1897 — March 29, 1951) was a Canadian professional ice hockey forward who played 33 games in the National Hockey League for the Montreal Canadiens during the 1925–26 season. The rest of his career, which lasted from 1917 to 1927, was spent in minor leagues. He was born in Sainte-Anne-de-Bellevue, Quebec. Hector is the brother of Alfred Lépine.

== Career statistics ==
=== Regular season and playoffs ===
			Regular season					Playoffs
Season	Team	League	GP	G	A	Pts	PIM	GP	G	A	Pts	PIM
1917–18	Montreal La Casquette	MCHL	8	3	0	3	0	—	—	—	—	—
1918–19	Montreal Garnets	MCHL	6	0	0	0	0	—	—	—	—	—
1921–22	Sainte-Anne-de-Bellevue	QIHA	—	—	—	—	—	—	—	—	—	—
1922–23	Montreal Royals	MCHL	4	14	0	14	—	—	—	—	—	—
1923–24	Montreal Hochelaga	MCHL	7	15	0	15	0	—	—	—	—	—
1924–25	Montreal Nationale	MCHL	3	2	0	2	0	—	—	—	—	—
1924–24	Fort Pitt Hornets	CHL	21	11	0	11	—	8	1	0	1	—
1925–26	Montreal Canadiens	NHL	33	5	2	7	2	—	—	—	—	—
1926–27	Providence Reds	Can-Am	28	6	1	7	28	—	—	—	—	—
NHL totals			33	5	2	7	2	—	—	—	—	—
