= Bonner Larose =

Canadian ice hockey player

- Born: February 14, 1901 Ottawa, Ontario, Canada
- Died: January 23, 1963 (aged 61)
- Height: 5 ft 8 in (173 cm)
- Weight: 170 lb (77 kg; 12 st 2 lb)
- Position: Left wing
- Shot: Right
- Played for: Boston Bruins
- Playing career: 1917–1928

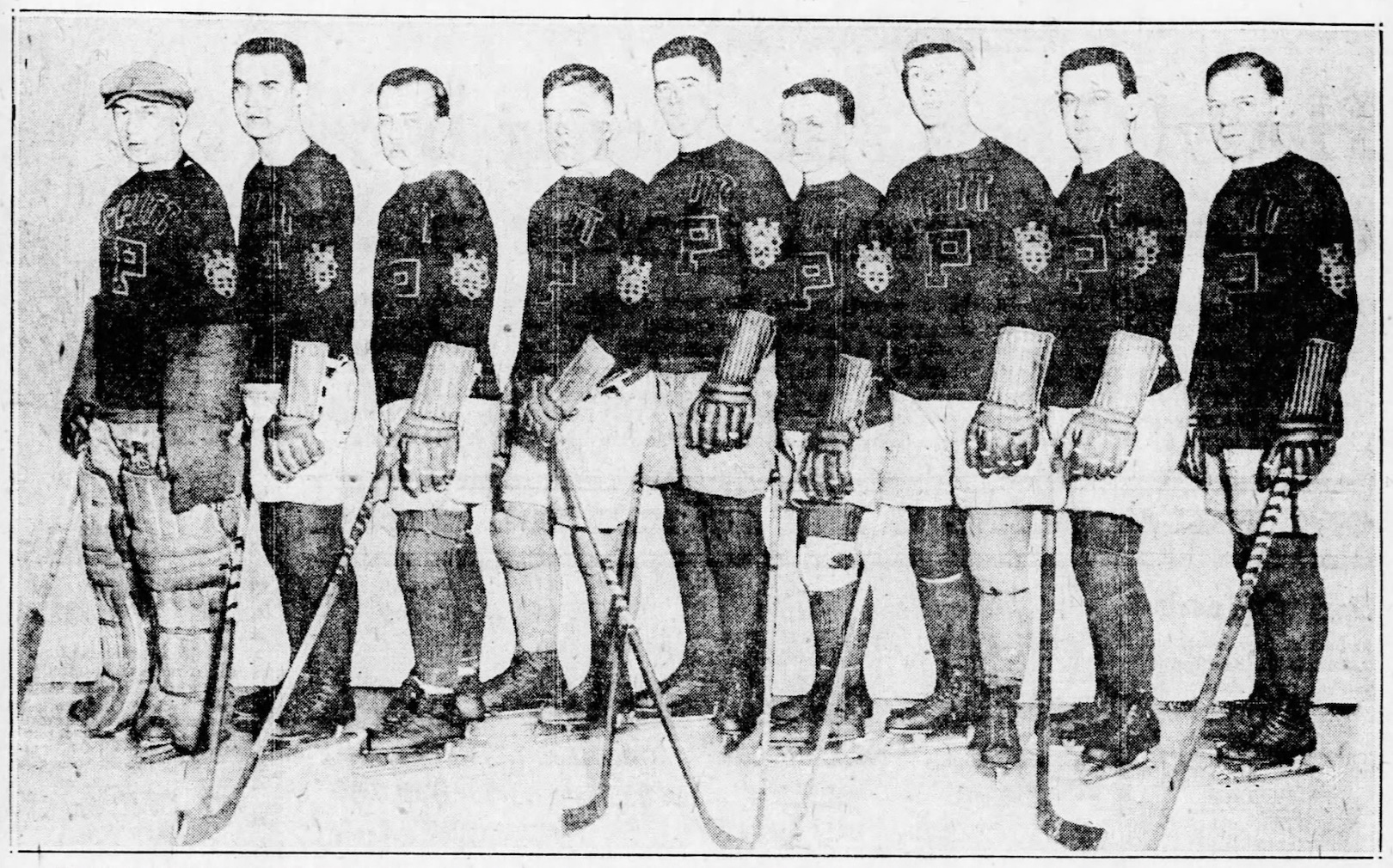
Larose, third from the left, with the Fort Pitt Hornets in 1924–25

Charles Bonner Larose (February 14, 1901, in Ottawa, Ontario – January 23, 1963) was a Canadian ice hockey player who played six games in the National Hockey League with the Boston Bruins during the 1925–26 season. The rest of his career, which lasted from 1917 to 1928, was mainly spent in the Ottawa City Hockey League.

== Career statistics ==
=== Regular season and playoffs ===
			Regular season					Playoffs
Season	Team	League	GP	G	A	Pts	PIM	GP	G	A	Pts	PIM
1917–18	Ottawa St. Brigid	OCHL	5	0	0	0	16	—	—	—	—	—
1917–18	Ottawa St. Brigid	HOHL	3	0	0	0	0	—	—	—	—	—
1919–20	Ottawa St. Pats	OCHL	9	4	0	4	—	—	—	—	—	—
1920–21	Ottawa K of C	OCHL	6	1	0	1	—	—	—	—	—	—
1921–22	Ottawa K of C	OCHL	11	6	5	11	6	—	—	—	—	—
1922–23	Ottawa Royal Canadians	OCHL	14	10	4	14	23	—	—	—	—	—
1923–24	Ottawa Royal Canadians	OCHL	12	5	1	6	—	—	—	—	—	—
1924–25	Fort Pitt Hornets	USAHA	22	7	0	7	—	8	0	0	0	0
1925–26	St. Paul Saints	CHL	10	0	0	0	0	—	—	—	—	—
1925–26	Boston Bruins	NHL	6	0	0	0	0	—	—	—	—	—
1926–27	Boston Tigers	Can-Am	13	0	1	1	4	—	—	—	—	—
1926–27	New Haven Eagles	Can-Am	5	0	1	1	4	3	0	0	0	0
OCHL totals			57	26	10	36	45	—	—	—	—	—
NHL totals			6	0	0	0	0	—	—	—	—	—
