= Paddy Sullivan =

Canadian ice hockey player

- Born: January 19, 1893; Williamstown, Ontario, Canada
- Died: October 7, 1975 (aged 82)
- Height: 5 ft 5 in (165 cm)
- Weight: 155 lb (70 kg; 11 st 1 lb)
- Position: Centre
- Shot: Left
- Played for: Ottawa Senators
- Playing career: 1913–1931

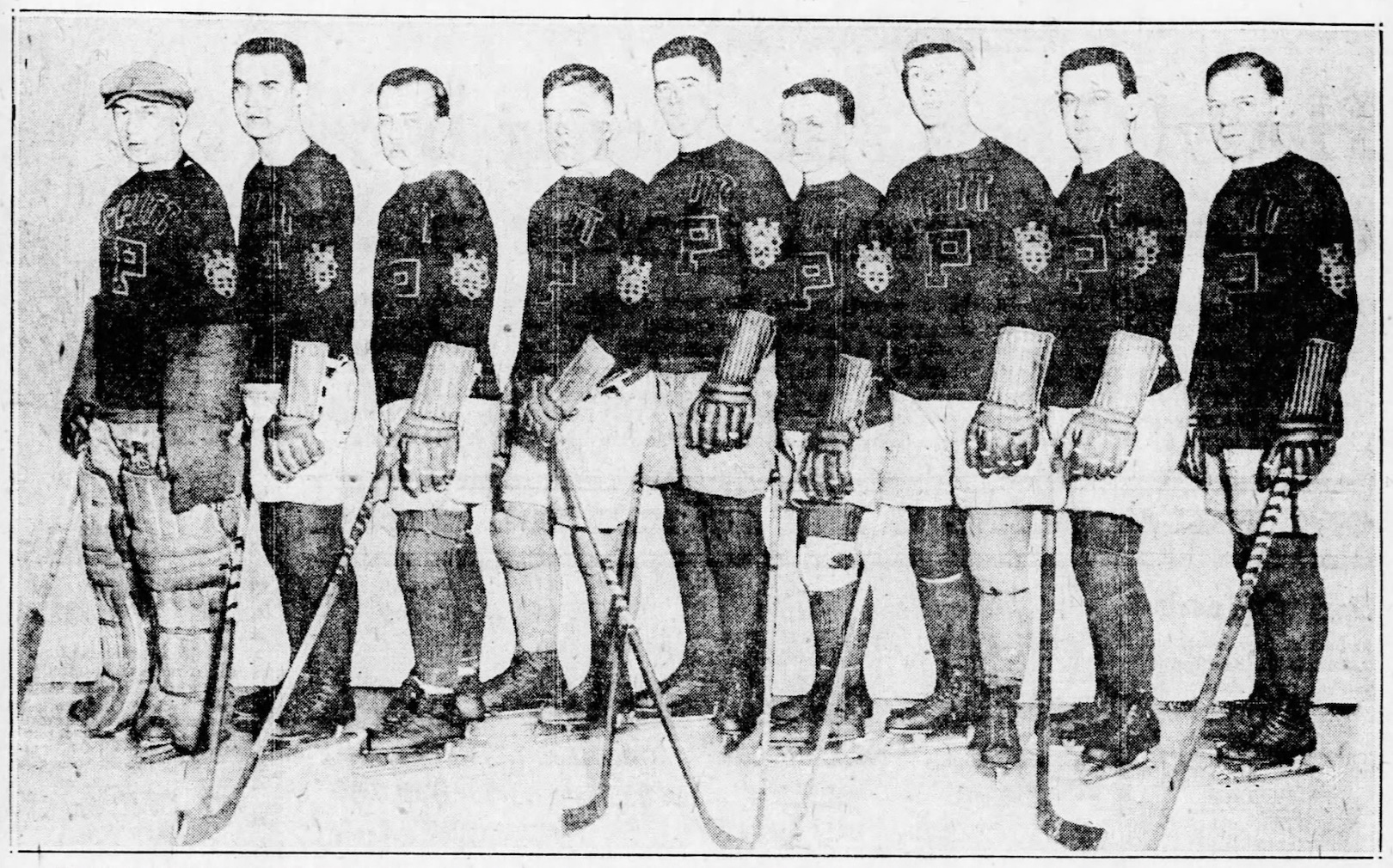
Sullivan (fourth from the right) with the Fort Pitt Hornets in 1924–25

James Arthur Sullivan (January 19, 1893 – October 7, 1975) was a Canadian professional ice hockey player. He played with the Ottawa Senators of the National Hockey Association during the 1914–15 season.

Sullivan was on the Pittsburgh Yellow Jackets team that won the United States Amateur Hockey Association championship in 1924. In the season that followed, he captained the same league's Fort Pitt Hornets.

He practiced dentistry after retiring from hockey.
