= Merlyn Phillips =

Canadian ice hockey player

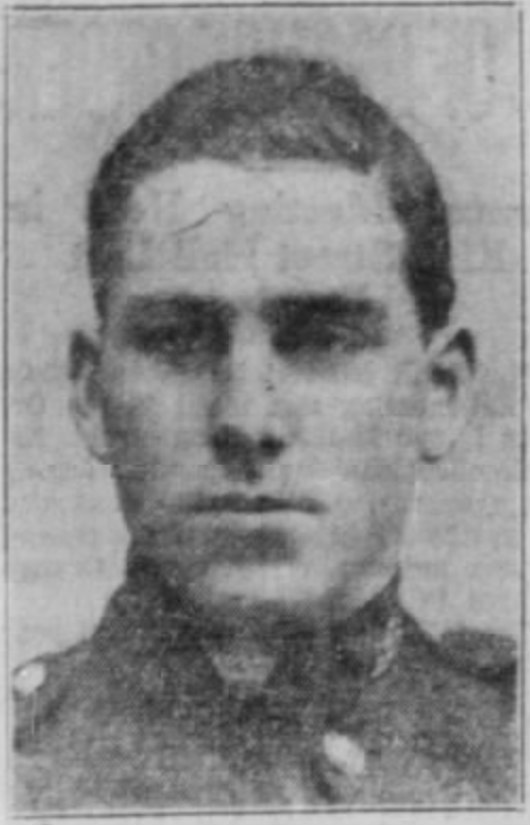
- Born: May 25, 1896 Richmond Hill, Ontario, Canada
- Died: January 10, 1978 (aged 81)
- Height: 5 ft 7 in (170 cm)
- Weight: 160 lb (73 kg; 11 st 6 lb)
- Position: Centre
- Shot: Right
- Played for: Montreal Maroons; New York Americans
- Playing career: 1916–1933

Merlyn Joseph "Bill" Phillips (25 May 1896 – 10 January 1978) was a Canadian professional ice hockey player. He played in the National Hockey League with the Montreal Maroons and New York Americans between 1926 and 1933. With Montreal he won the Stanley Cup in 1926. Prior to his NHL career, Philipps spent several years playing for senior Sault Ste. Marie Greyhounds. Phillips was born in Richmond Hill, Ontario.

== Career statistics ==
=== Regular season and playoffs ===
| | | | Regular season | | | | | Playoffs |
| Season | Team | League | GP | G | A | Pts | PIM | GP | G | A | Pts | PIM |
|---|---|---|---|---|---|---|---|---|---|---|---|---|
| 1914–15 | University of Western Ontario | OHA | — | — | — | — | — | — | — | — | — | — |
| 1915–16 | London Ontarios | OHA | — | — | — | — | — | — | — | — | — | — |
| 1916–17 | London AAB | OHA | — | — | — | — | — | — | — | — | — | — |
| 1916–17 | London 149th | OHA Sr | — | — | — | — | — | — | — | — | — | — |
| 1917–18 | Campbellton Army | NNBHL | — | — | — | — | — | — | — | — | — | — |
| 1919–20 | Sault Ste. Marie Greyhounds | NOHA | 2 | 1 | 1 | 2 | 2 | — | — | — | — | — |
| 1919–20 | Sault Ste. Marie Greyhounds | NMHL-NA | 5 | 5 | 3 | 8 | — | — | — | — | — | — |
| 1920–21 | Sault Ste. Marie Greyhounds | NOHA | 9 | 8 | 9 | 17 | 38 | 5 | 4 | 3 | 7 | — |
| 1920–21 | Sault Ste. Marie Greyhounds | NMHL-NA | 13 | 11 | 11 | 22 | — | 2 | — | 1 | — | 2 |
| 1921–22 | Sault Ste. Marie Greyhounds | NOHA | 8 | 9 | 6 | 15 | 22 | 2 | 0 | 1 | 1 | 2 |
| 1921–22 | Sault Ste. Marie Greyhounds | NMHL-NA | 12 | 10 | 14 | 24 | — | — | — | — | — | — |
| 1922–23 | Sault Ste. Marie Greyhounds | NOHA | 8 | 8 | 3 | 11 | 12 | 2 | 1 | 0 | 1 | 4 |
| 1922–23 | Sault Ste. Marie Greyhounds | Al-Cup | — | — | — | — | — | 5 | 9 | 1 | 10 | 4 |
| 1923–24 | Sault Ste. Marie Greyhounds | NOHA | 8 | 6 | 8 | 14 | 10 | 7 | 5 | 6 | 11 | 8 |
| 1924–25 | Sault Ste. Marie Greyhounds | NOHA | — | — | — | — | — | — | — | — | — | — |
| 1925–26 | Sault Ste. Marie Greyhounds | CHL | 20 | 9 | 4 | 13 | 32 | — | — | — | — | — |
| 1925–26 | Montreal Maroons | NHL | 12 | 3 | 1 | 4 | 6 | 4 | 3 | 0 | 3 | 4 |
| 1925–26 | Montreal Maroons | St-Cup | — | — | — | — | — | 4 | 1 | 1 | 2 | 0 |
| 1926–27 | Montreal Maroons | NHL | 43 | 15 | 1 | 16 | 45 | 2 | 0 | 0 | 0 | 0 |
| 1927–28 | Montreal Maroons | NHL | 40 | 7 | 5 | 12 | 33 | 9 | 2 | 1 | 3 | 9 |
| 1928–29 | Montreal Maroons | NHL | 42 | 6 | 5 | 11 | 41 | — | — | — | — | — |
| 1929–30 | Montreal Maroons | NHL | 44 | 13 | 10 | 23 | 48 | 4 | 0 | 0 | 0 | 2 |
| 1930–31 | Montreal Maroons | NHL | 43 | 6 | 1 | 7 | 38 | 1 | 0 | 0 | 0 | 2 |
| 1930–31 | Windsor Bulldogs | IHL | 3 | 3 | 1 | 4 | 0 | — | — | — | — | — |
| 1931–32 | Montreal Maroons | NHL | 46 | 1 | 1 | 2 | 11 | 4 | 0 | 0 | 0 | 2 |
| 1932–33 | Montreal Maroons | NHL | 2 | 0 | 0 | 0 | 0 | — | — | — | — | — |
| 1932–33 | New York Americans | NHL | 29 | 1 | 7 | 8 | 10 | — | — | — | — | — |
| NHL totals | | | 783 | 163 | 244 | 407 | 436 | 40 | 13 | 9 | 22 | 13 |
