= Lorne Chabot =

Canadian ice hockey player

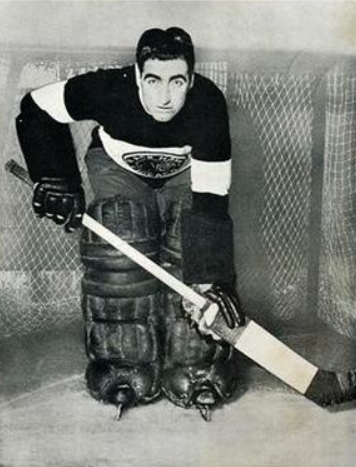
- Chabot with the Chicago Black Hawks in 1934
- Born: October 5, 1900 Montreal, Quebec, Canada
- Died: October 10, 1946 (aged 46) Montreal, Quebec, Canada
- Height: 6 ft 1 in (185 cm)
- Weight: 185 lb (84 kg; 13 st 3 lb)
- Position: Goaltender
- Caught: Left
- Played for: New York Rangers; Toronto Maple Leafs; Montreal Canadiens; Chicago Black Hawks; Montreal Maroons; New York Americans
- Playing career: 1926–1937

Laurent Edward Chabot (October 5, 1900 – October 10, 1946) was a Canadian professional ice hockey player. Chabot played in the National Hockey League (NHL) from 1926 to 1937. He was a member of two Stanley Cup championship teams, the New York Rangers in 1928, and the Toronto Maple Leafs in 1932. Chabot also played for the Montreal Canadiens, Chicago Black Hawks, Montreal Maroons, and New York Americans. Chabot won the Vezina Trophy in 1934–35 for allowing the fewest goals against.

== Playing career ==
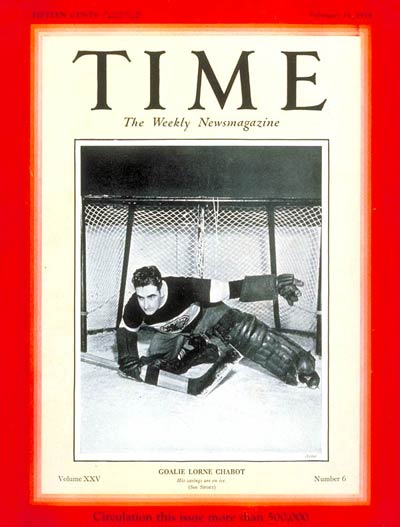
Chabot on the cover of Time Magazine on 11 February 1935

During his stint with the Rangers, he was billed as "Lorne Chabotsky" by Rangers' publicity men Bruno and Blythe, in an attempt to garner more Jewish fans. Chabot was unhappy with the arrangement and the publicity men were soon replaced by Jack Filman. Chabot was also the goalie who was injured during the 1928 playoffs, forcing coach Lester Patrick into the goal for the remainder of the game.

Chabot played in the two longest games in NHL history, losing the longest in 1935–36 as a member of the Montreal Maroons and winning the second longest in 1932–33 as a member of the Toronto Maple Leafs. Both games went into the sixth overtime; both final scores were 1–0. Lorne was traded to the Montreal Canadiens for George Hainsworth on October 1, 1933. He was the first hockey player to appear on the cover of Time Magazine. It was the February 11, 1935 issue, the lone season when Chabot was playing with the Chicago Black Hawks.

Years after his retirement, he suffered from severe arthritis and was bedridden. He developed Bright's Disease and after a long bout with it, he died, five days after his 46th birthday. He was buried in the Notre Dame des Neiges Cemetery in Montreal.

== Legacy ==
In 1998, he was ranked number 84 on a list of the 100 greatest hockey players compiled by The Hockey News. He was the only player on the list then eligible for the Hockey Hall of Fame who has not been elected. Similarly, in two separate editions of the foregoing publication's "The Top 100 Players of All-Time" (2010 and 2018), Chabot was rated as the 20th best goaltender, the only eligible one on the list not inducted into the Hockey Hall of Fame.

The 2009 release 100 Ranger Greats ranked Chabot 95th all-time of the 901 New York Rangers who had played during the team's first 82 seasons.

== Career statistics ==
=== Regular season and playoffs ===
			Regular season								Playoffs
Season	Team	League	GP	W	L	T	Min	GA	SO	GAA	GP	W	L	T	Min	GA	SO	GAA
1919–20	Laval College	MCHL	—	—	—	—	—	—	—	—	—	—	—	—	—	—	—	—
1919–20	Brandon Mounted Police	BrIHL	—	—	—	—	—	—	—	—	—	—	—	—	—	—	—	—
1920–21	Brandon Wheat City	MHL-Sr.	1	1	0	0	60	3	0	3.00	—	—	—	—	—	—	—	—
1920–21	Brandon Columbus Club	BrIHL	—	—	—	—	—	—	—	—	—	—	—	—	—	—	—	—
1921–22	Brandon Wheat City	MHL-Sr.	—	—	—	—	—	—	—	—	—	—	—	—	—	—	—	—
1922–23	Port Arthur Ports	MHL-Sr.	16	11	5	0	960	57	0	3.56	2	1	1	0	120	3	1	1.50
1923–24	Port Arthur Ports	MHL-Sr.	15	11	4	0	900	37	1	2.46	2	0	1	1	120	6	0	3.00
1924–25	Port Arthur Ports	MHL-Sr.	20	12	8	0	1200	51	3	2.55	2	2	0	0	120	4	0	2.00
1924–25	Port Arthur Ports	Al-Cup	—	—	—	—	—	—	—	—	8	6	1	1	480	16	1	2.00
1925–26	Port Arthur Ports	TBSHL	20	14	6	0	1200	42	2	2.10	3	2	0	1	180	4	1	1.33
1925–26	Port Arthur Ports	Al-Cup	—	—	—	—	—	—	—	—	6	5	1	0	360	13	1	2.17
1926–27	New York Rangers	NHL	36	22	9	5	2307	56	10	1.46	2	0	1	1	120	3	1	1.50
1926–27	Springfield Indians	Can-Am	1	1	0	0	60	2	0	2.00	—	—	—	—	—	—	—	—
1927–28	New York Rangers	NHL	44	19	16	9	2730	79	11	1.74	6	2	2	1	321	8	1	1.50
1928–29	Toronto Maple Leafs	NHL	43	20	18	5	2458	66	11	1.61	4	2	2	0	242	5	0	1.24
1929–30	Toronto Maple Leafs	NHL	42	16	20	6	2620	113	6	2.59	—	—	—	—	—	—	—	—
1930–31	Toronto Maple Leafs	NHL	37	21	8	8	2300	80	6	2.09	2	0	1	1	139	4	0	1.73
1931–32	Toronto Maple Leafs	NHL	44	22	16	6	2698	106	4	2.36	7	5	1	1	438	15	0	2.05
1932–33	Toronto Maple Leafs	NHL	48	24	18	6	2946	111	5	2.26	9	4	5	0	686	18	2	1.57
1933–34	Montreal Canadiens	NHL	47	21	20	6	2928	101	8	2.07	2	0	1	1	131	4	0	1.83
1934–35	Chicago Black Hawks	NHL	48	26	17	5	2940	88	8	1.80	2	0	1	1	124	1	1	0.48
1935–36	Montreal Maroons	NHL	16	8	3	5	1010	35	2	2.08	3	0	3	0	297	6	0	1.21
1936–37	New York Americans	NHL	6	2	3	1	370	25	1	4.05	—	—	—	—	—	—	—	—
NHL totals			411	201	148	62	25,307	860	72	2.04	37	13	17	6	2498	64	5	1.54

== Awards and achievements ==
- Allan Cup (1925, 1926)
- Stanley Cup Championship (1928, 1932)
- Vezina Trophy (1935)
- NHL First All-Star Team (1935)

Preceded by Charlie Gardiner	Winner of the Vezina Trophy; 1935	Succeeded by Cecil Thompson
