= Canada at the 1924 Winter Olympics =

- IOC code: CAN
- NOC: Canadian Olympic Committee
- Website: www.olympic.ca (in English and French)

in Chamonix
- Competitors: 12 (11 men, 1 woman) in 3 sports
- Flag bearer: Ernie Collett (ice hockey)
- Medals Ranked 8th: Gold 1 Silver 0 Bronze 0 Total 1

Winter Olympics appearances (overview)
- 1924; 1928; 1932; 1936; 1948; 1952; 1956; 1960; 1964; 1968; 1972; 1976; 1980; 1984; 1988; 1992; 1994; 1998; 2002; 2006; 2010; 2014; 2018; 2022; 2026

Canada competed at the 1924 Winter Olympics in Chamonix, France. They won one gold medal, in ice hockey.

== Medalists ==
Medal	Name	Sport
Gold	Canada men's national ice hockey team (Toronto Granites): Jack Cameron; Ernie Collett; Bert McCaffrey; Harold McMunn; Duncan Munro; Beattie Ramsay; Cyril Slater; Reginald "Hooley" Smith; Harry Watson	Ice hockey

== Figure skating ==
Men

Athlete	Event	CF	FS	Points	Places	Final rank
Melville Rogers	Men's singles	7	8	269.82	51	7

Women

Athlete	Event	CF	FS	Points	Places	Final rank
Cecil Smith	Women's singles	5	5	230.75	44	6

Pairs

Athletes	Points	Score	Final rank
Cecil Smith; Melville Rogers	41	9.11	7

== Ice hockey ==
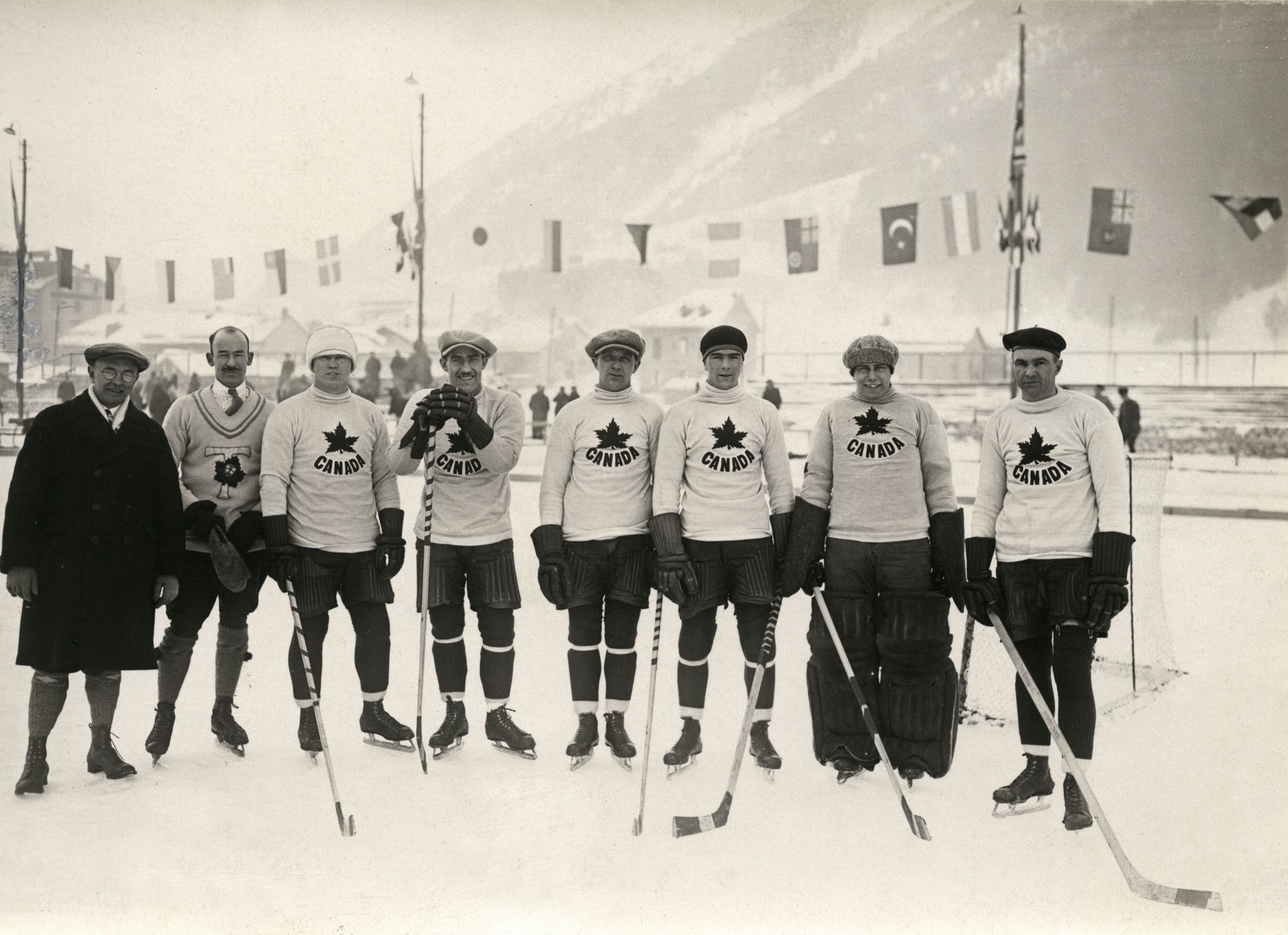
Toronto Granites at the 1924 Winter Olympics

The Canadian Amateur Hockey Association (CAHA) chose the Toronto Granites as the 1923 Allan Cup champions to represent Canada in ice hockey at the 1924 Winter Olympics, and W. A. Hewitt was chosen oversee the national team's finances at the Olympics. Hewitt was empowered by the CAHA to name replacement players as needed, and recruited Harold McMunn and Cyril Slater as replacements when four players from the Granites were unable to travel to the Olympics. In his weekly report to the Toronto Daily Star, Hewitt wrote that the Granites would face multiple changes in conditions compared to hockey games in Canada. He did not feel the team would be affected by playing outdoors on natural ice in the morning or afternoon, despite that the team was accustomed to playing indoors with electric lighting on artificial ice. He also felt that the larger ice surface and lack of boards around the sides of the rink would mean more stick handling and less physical play.

During the Olympics, Hewitt attended the annual meeting and elections for the Ligue Internationale de Hockey sur Glace (LIHG). Since its rules stated that one of the vice-presidents must be from North America, Hewitt and United States Amateur Hockey Association president William S. Haddock opted for a coin toss, which decided that Haddock was elected to the position. When the Olympics organizers wanted to select hockey referees by drawing names out of a hat, Hewitt and Haddock agreed to another coin toss to decide on the referee for the game between Canada and the United States men's national team. Hewitt feared having an inexperienced referee for the game, and his suggested to have LIHG president Paul Loicq officiate the game was confirmed by the coin toss. The Granites defeated the United States team by a 6–1 score, and won all six games played to be the Olympic gold medallists.

=== Group A ===
The top two teams (highlighted) advanced to the medal round.

Team	GP	W	L	GF	GA
Canada	3	3	0	85	0
Sweden	3	2	1	18	25
Czechoslovakia	3	1	2	14	41
Switzerland	3	0	3	2	53

28 Jan	Canada	30:0 (8:0,14:0,8:0)	Czechoslovakia
29 Jan	Canada	22:0 (5:0,7:0,10:0)	Sweden
30 Jan	Canada	33:0 (8:0,11:0,14:0)	Switzerland

=== Medal round ===
Results from the group round (Canada-Sweden and United States-Great Britain) carried forward to the medal round.

Team	GP	W	L	GF	GA
Canada (gold)	3	3	0	47	3
United States	3	2	1	32	6
Great Britain	3	1	2	6	33
Sweden	3	0	3	3	46

1 Feb	Canada	19:2 (6:2,6:0,7:0)	Great Britain
3 Feb	Canada	6:1 (2:1,3:0,1:0)	United States

=== Top scorer ===
Team	GP	G	A	Pts
(Canada) Harry Watson	5	37	9	46

Gold:
Canada

Jack Cameron
Ernie Collett
Bert McCaffrey
Harold McMunn
Dunc Munro
Beattie Ramsay
Cyril Slater
Hooley Smith
Harry Watson
Henry Louis Hudson

== Speed skating ==
Men

Event	Athlete	Race	
Event	Athlete	Time	Rank
500 m	Charles Gorman	45.4	7
1500 m	Charles Gorman	2:35.4	11
5000 m	Charles Gorman	DNF	–

All-round
Distances: 500m; 5000m; 1500m & 10,000m.

Athlete	Until distance 1			Until distance 2			Until distance 3			Total		
Athlete	Points	Score	rank	Points	Score	rank	Points	Score	rank	Points	Score	rank
Charles Gorman	5	45.40	5	DNF								

== Sources ==
- Podnieks, Andrew (1997). Canada's Olympic Hockey Teams: The Complete History 1920–1998. Toronto, Ontario: Doubleday Canada. ISBN 0-385-25688-4.
- M. Avé, Comité Olympique Français (ed.). Les Jeux de la VIII^{e} Olympiade Paris 1924 - Rapport Officiel (PDF) (in French). Paris: Librairie de France. Archived from the original (PDF) on 2011-05-05.
- "Olympic Medal Winners". International Olympic Committee. Archived from the original on 2008-05-09.
- Olympic Winter Games 1924, full results by sports-reference.com
