= Toronto National Sea Fleas =

Defunct Canadian ice hockey team

- Sport: Ice hockey
- League: OHA Senior A League
- Location: Toronto, Ontario, Canada
- Championships: 1

The Toronto National Sea Fleas were a senior men's amateur ice hockey team that won the 1932 Allan Cup, and also represented Canada at the 1933 World Ice Hockey Championships held in Prague, Czechoslovakia where the team lost the final game to the United States in overtime to capture the silver medal for Canada.

The 1932 team which won the Allan Cup was coached by Harry Watson, who as a player had won an Olympic gold medal with a 1924 Toronto Granites. Watson stepped down as head coach prior to the 1933 World Championships, to be replaced by Harold Ballard for the 1933 tournament and season.

The Toronto National Sea Fleas played as part of the Ontario Hockey Association (OHA) in the OHA Senior A League. The team were finalists for the league championship in 1930, and won the J. Ross Robertson Cup as league champions in 1932.
