= Ice hockey at the 1924 Winter Olympics =

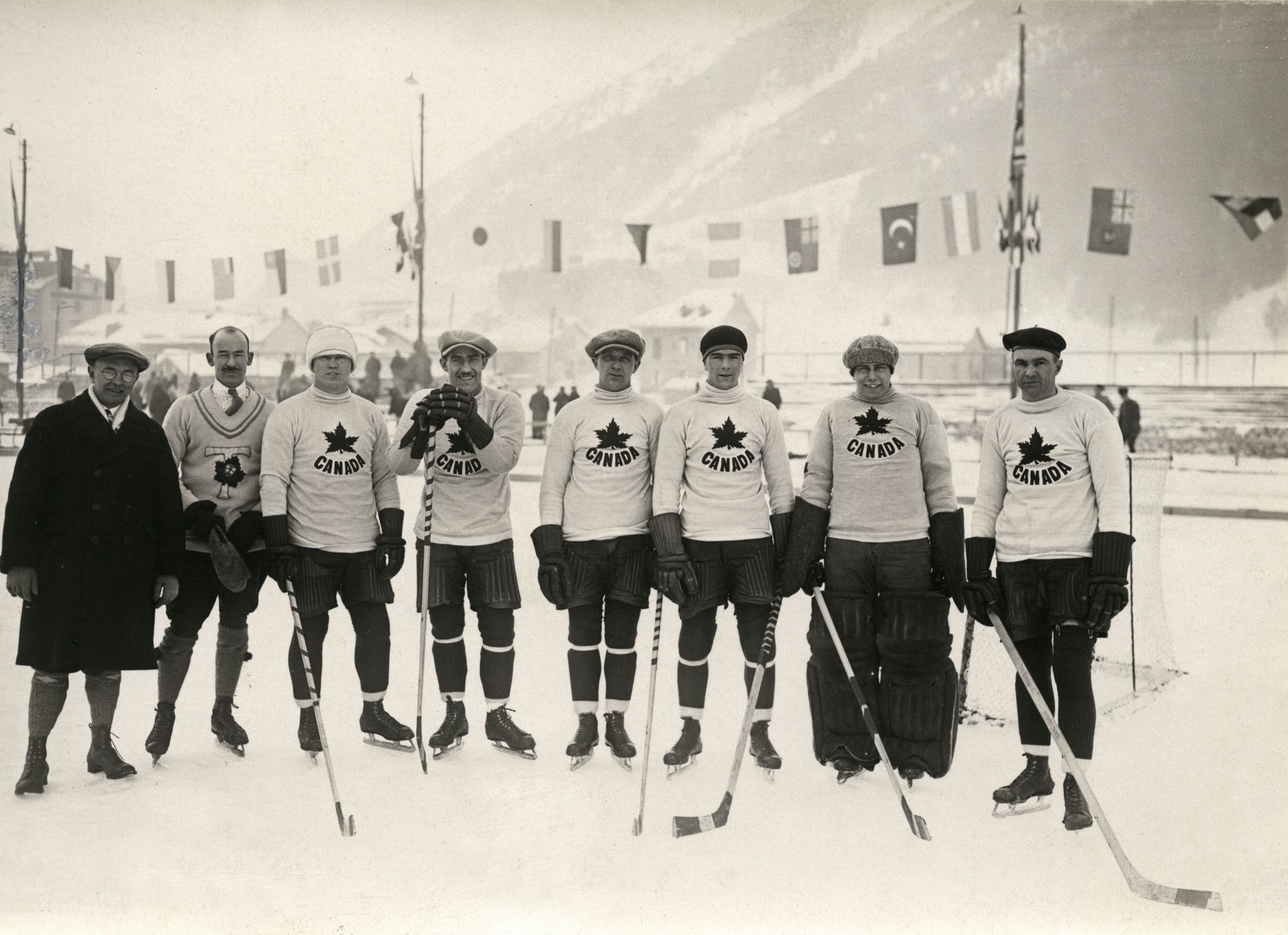
- The Toronto Granites, representing Canada, won the gold medal

Tournament details
- Host country: France
- Venue: Stade Olympique de Chamonix (outdoors)
- Dates: January 28 – February 3, 1924
- Teams: 8

Final positions
- Champions: Canada (2nd title)
- Runners-up: United States
- Third place: Great Britain
- Fourth place: Sweden

Tournament statistics
- Games played: 16
- Goals scored: 310 (19.38 per game)
- Scoring leader: (Canada) Harry Watson (46 points)

The men's ice hockey tournament at the 1924 Winter Olympics in Chamonix, France, was the second Olympic Championship, also serving as the second World Championships. The competition was held from Monday, January 28, 1924, to Sunday, February 3, 1924. Canada, represented by the Toronto Granites, defended its championship from the 1920 Summer Olympics. The United States and Great Britain took the silver and bronze respectively, while other contenders included Czechoslovakia, France, and Sweden.

The Bergvall system used in the 1920 Olympics was discarded in favor of a two-level round-robin tournament. Qualifying teams were placed in pools for the opening round, with the top two teams in each pool advancing to the final round. The medals were awarded based on the record in the final round. This format would remain in use until the 1992 Winter Olympics, when the final round-robin was replaced with a medal-round single-elimination tournament.

The Canadian Amateur Hockey Association (CAHA) chose the Toronto Granites as the 1923 Allan Cup champions to represent Canada, and W. A. Hewitt was chosen oversee the national team's finances at the Olympics. Hewitt was empowered by the CAHA to name replacement players as needed, and recruited Harold McMunn and Cyril Slater as replacements when four players from the Granites were unable to travel to the Olympics. In his weekly report to the Toronto Daily Star, Hewitt wrote that the Granites would face multiple changes in conditions compared to hockey games in Canada. He did not feel the team would be affected by playing outdoors on natural ice in the morning or afternoon, despite that the team was accustomed to playing indoors with electric lighting on artificial ice. He also felt that the larger ice surface and lack of boards around the sides of the rink would mean more stick handling and less physical play.

Austria was eligible to compete after having been excluded in 1920, but they withdrew just before the tournament due to the ineligibility of three international players.

== Medalists ==
Gold	Silver	Bronze
Canada Jack Cameron; Ernie Collett; Bert McCaffrey; Harold McMunn; Dunc Munro; Beattie Ramsay; Cyril Slater; Hooley Smith; Harry Watson	United States Clarence Abel; Herbert Drury; Alphonse Lacroix; Art Langley; John Lyons; Justin McCarthy; Willard Rice; Irving Small; Frank Synott	Great Britain William Anderson; Lorne Carr-Harris; Colin Carruthers; Eric Carruthers; Guy Clarkson; Ross Cuthbert; Geoffrey Holmes; Hamilton Jukes; Edward Pitblado; Blane Sexton

== Participating nations ==
A total of 82(*) ice hockey players from eight nations competed at the Chamonix Games:

- Belgium (10)
- Canada (9)
- Czechoslovakia (11)
- France (12)
- Great Britain (10)
- Sweden (10)
- Switzerland (11)
- United States (9)

(*) NOTE: Only counts players who participated in at least one game. Not all reserve players are known.

== First round ==
=== Group A ===
Pos	Team	Pld	W	L	GF	GA	GD	PCT	Qualification
1	Canada	3	3	0	85	0	+85	1.000	Advanced to Final Round
2	Sweden	3	2	1	18	25	−7	.667	Advanced to Final Round
3	Czechoslovakia	3	1	2	14	41	−27	.333	
4	Switzerland	3	0	3	2	53	−51	.000	

Source: HockeyCanada.ca

Date		Result		P1	P2	P3
28 Jan	Sweden	9 - 0	Switzerland	3 - 0	3 - 0	3 - 0
28 Jan	Canada	30 - 0	Czechoslovakia	8 - 0	14 - 0	8 - 0
29 Jan	Canada	22 - 0	Sweden	5 - 0	7 - 0	10 - 0
30 Jan	Canada	33 - 0	Switzerland	8 - 0	11 - 0	14 - 0
31 Jan	Sweden	9 - 3	Czechoslovakia	5 - 1	1 - 1	3 - 0
01 Feb	Czechoslovakia	11 - 2	Switzerland	4 - 0	3 - 2	4 - 0

=== Group B ===
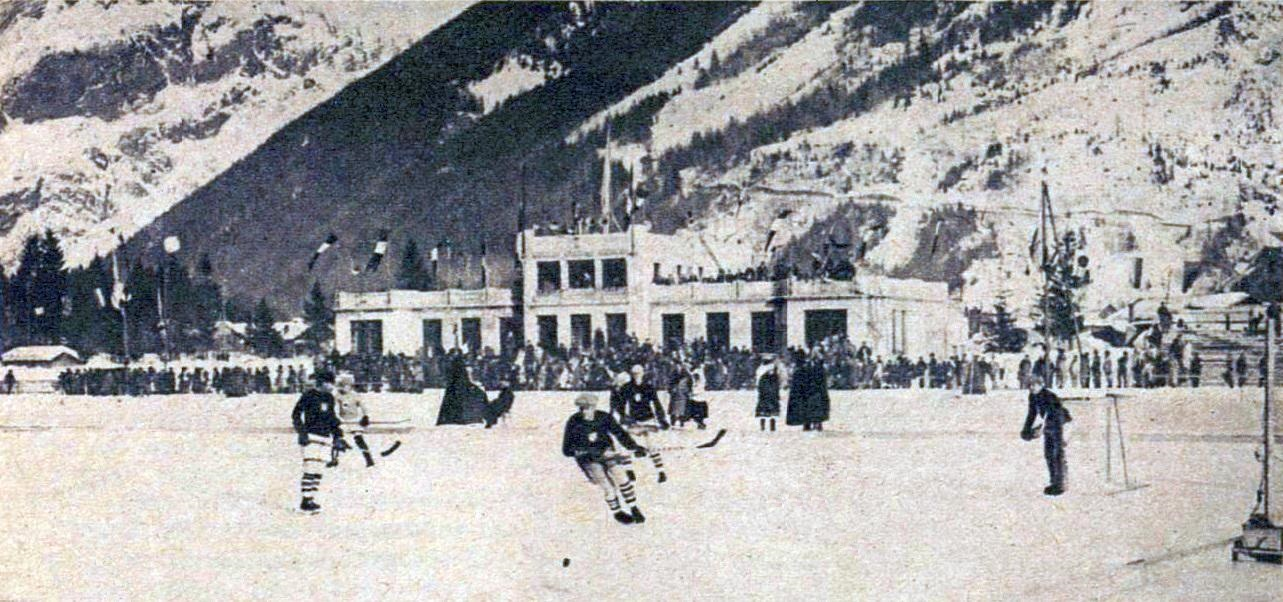
Match between France and the United States

Pos	Team	Pld	W	L	GF	GA	GD	PCT	Qualification
1	United States	3	3	0	52	0	+52	1.000	Advanced to Final Round
2	Great Britain	3	2	1	34	16	+18	.667	Advanced to Final Round
3	France	3	1	2	9	42	−33	.333	
4	Belgium	3	0	3	8	45	−37	.000	

Source: HockeyCanada.ca

Date		Result		P1	P2	P3
28 Jan	United States	19 - 0	Belgium	9 - 0	6 - 0	4 - 0
29 Jan	Great Britain	15 - 2	France	5 - 1	3 - 1	7 - 0
30 Jan	Great Britain	19 - 3	Belgium	8 - 1	6 - 1	5 - 1
30 Jan	United States	22 - 0	France	12 - 0	1 - 0	9 - 0
31 Jan	France	7 - 5	Belgium	3 - 3	3 - 1	1 - 1
31 Jan	United States	11 - 0	Great Britain	6 - 0	2 - 0	3 - 0

== Final round ==
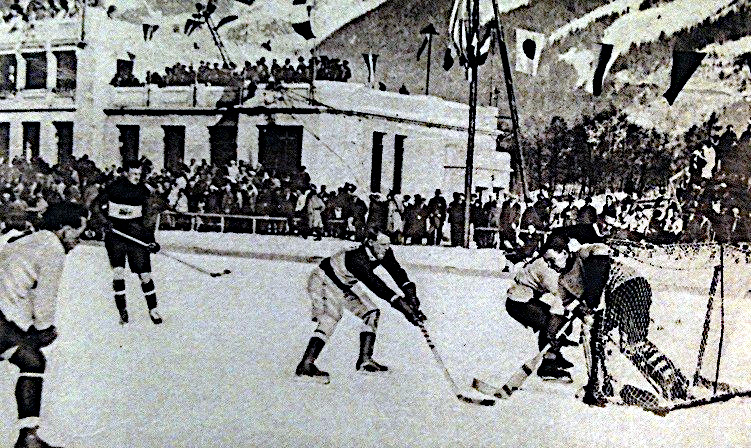
Canada and Great Britain in the final round.

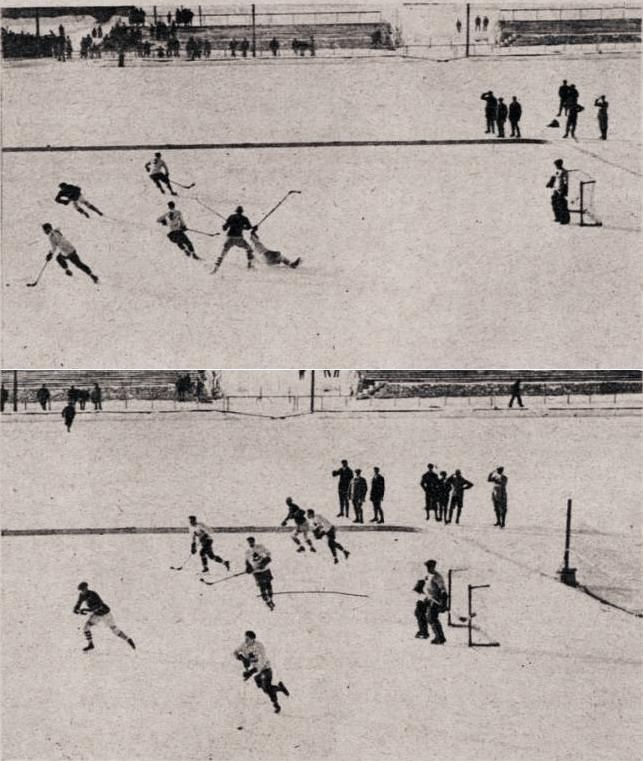
The final game, between Canada and the United States.

Pos	Team	Pld	W	L	GF	GA	GD	PCT
1st place, gold medalist(s)	Canada	3	3	0	47	3	+44	1.000
2nd place, silver medalist(s)	United States	3	2	1	32	6	+26	.667
3rd place, bronze medalist(s)	Great Britain	3	1	2	6	33	−27	.333
4	Sweden	3	0	3	3	46	−43	.000

Source: HockeyCanada.ca

Note: The CAN v SWE and USA v GBR games were carried forward from the previous round.

When the Olympics organizers wanted to select hockey referees by drawing names out of a hat, the Canadian Amateur Hockey Association's W. A. Hewitt and United States Amateur Hockey Association president William S. Haddock agreed to a coin toss to decide on the referee for the game between Canada and the United States men's national team. Hewitt feared having an inexperienced referee for the game, and his suggestion to have Ligue Internationale de Hockey sur Glace (LIHG) president Paul Loicq officiate the game was confirmed by the coin toss. The Toronto Granites defeated the United States team by a 6–1 score, and won all six games played to be the Olympic gold medallists.

Date		Result		P1	P2	P3
01 Feb	Canada	19 - 2	Great Britain	6 - 2	6 - 0	7 - 0
01 Feb	United States	20 - 0	Sweden	5 - 0	7 - 0	8 - 0
02 Feb	Great Britain	4 - 3	Sweden	0 - 1	2 - 2	2 - 0
03 Feb	Canada	6 - 1	United States	2 - 1	3 - 0	1 - 0

== Statistics ==
=== Average age ===
Team Czechoslovakia was the oldest team in the tournament, averaging 31 years and 5 months. Team Belgium was the youngest team in the tournament, averaging 24 years and 1 months. Gold medalists Canada averaged 25 years and 2 months. Tournament average was 27 years and 11 months.

=== Top scorer ===
Team	GP	G	A	Pts
(Canada) Harry Watson	5	37	9	46

== Final ranking ==
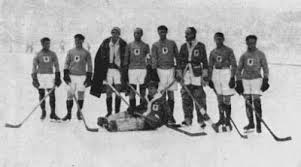
The French national team.

1	Canada
2	United States
3	Great Britain
4	Sweden
5	Czechoslovakia
5	France
7	Belgium
7	Switzerland

These standings are presented as the IIHF has them, however the IOC does not rank the teams below 4th

== Sources ==
- Podnieks, Andrew (1997). Canada's Olympic Hockey Teams: The Complete History 1920–1998. Toronto, Ontario: Doubleday Canada. ISBN 0-385-25688-4.
