= Canada at the Winter Olympics =

- IOC code: CAN
- NOC: Canadian Olympic Committee
- Website: www.olympic.ca (in English) www.olympique.ca (in French)
- Medals Ranked 4th: Gold 82 Silver 79 Bronze 85 Total 246

Winter Olympics appearances (overview)
- 1924; 1928; 1932; 1936; 1948; 1952; 1956; 1960; 1964; 1968; 1972; 1976; 1980; 1984; 1988; 1992; 1994; 1998; 2002; 2006; 2010; 2014; 2018; 2022; 2026

Flag used from 1924–1956

Flag used from 1960–1964

Canada (IOC country code CAN) has competed at every Winter Olympic Games, and has won at least one medal each time, one of only six nations to do so (along with Austria, Finland, Norway, Sweden and the United States). By total medals, the country's best performance was in the 2018 Winter Olympic Games where Canadian athletes won 29 medals. Canada set a new record for most gold medals won by a country in a single Winter Olympics with 14 at the 2010 Winter Olympics in Vancouver, Canada. This achievement surpassed the previous record of 13 gold medals held by the Soviet Union (1976) and Norway (2002). Both Germany and Norway matched the record total of 14 gold medals in Pyeongchang in 2018. This record has since been surpassed by Norway with 16 at the 2022 Winter Olympics.

Canada has hosted the winter games twice: in Calgary in 1988, and in Vancouver in 2010. Canada has also hosted the Summer Olympic Games once, in 1976 in Montreal.

== Medal tables ==
Medals by year

Host country

Games	Athletes	Gold	Silver	Bronze	Total	Gold medal	Total medal
(France) 1924 Chamonix	12	1	0	0	1	8	9
(Switzerland) 1928 St. Moritz	23	1	0	0	1	5	6
(United States) 1932 Lake Placid	42	1	1	5	7	4	3
(Nazi Germany) 1936 Garmisch-Partenkirchen	29	0	1	0	1	9	9
(Switzerland) 1948 St. Moritz	28	2	0	1	3	6	8
(Norway) 1952 Oslo	39	1	0	1	2	6	8
(Italy) 1956 Cortina d'Ampezzo	37	0	1	2	3	10	9
(United States) 1960 Squaw Valley	44	2	1	1	4	7	8
(Austria) 1964 Innsbruck	55	1	1	1	3	9	10
(France) 1968 Grenoble	70	1	1	1	3	13	14
(Japan) 1972 Sapporo	47	0	1	0	1	17	17
(Austria) 1976 Innsbruck	59	1	1	1	3	11	11
(United States) 1980 Lake Placid	59	0	1	1	2	14	13
(Socialist Federal Republic of Yugoslavia) 1984 Sarajevo	67	2	1	1	4	8	8
(Canada) 1988 Calgary	112	0	2	3	5	13	12
(France) 1992 Albertville	108	2	3	2	7	9	9
(Norway) 1994 Lillehammer	95	3	6	4	13	7	6
(Japan) 1998 Nagano	144	6	5	4	15	4	5
(United States) 2002 Salt Lake City	150	7	3	7	17	4	4
(Italy) 2006 Turin	191	7	10	7	24	5	3
(Canada) 2010 Vancouver	201	14	7	5	26	1	3
(Russia) 2014 Sochi	217	10	10	5	25	3	4
(South Korea) 2018 Pyeongchang	225	11	8	10	29	3	3
(China) 2022 Beijing	215	4	8	14	26	11	4
(Italy) 2026 Milano Cortina	205	5	7	9	21	11	8
(France) 2030 French Alps	future event						
(United States) 2034 Utah	future event						
Total (25/25)	2,474	82	79	85	246	4	5

Medals by sport

Leading in that sport

Sport	Gold	Silver	Bronze	Total
Freestyle skiing	14	13	8	35
Ice hockey	14	8	3	25
Speed skating	11	17	19	47
Short track speed skating	11	15	16	42
Curling	7	3	4	14
Figure skating	6	11	13	30
Snowboarding	5	6	7	18
Bobsleigh	5	2	4	11
Alpine skiing	4	1	7	12
Skeleton	2	1	1	4
Cross-country skiing	2	1	0	3
Biathlon	2	0	1	3
Luge	0	1	1	2
Ski jumping	0	0	1	1
Totals (14 entries)	83	79	85	247

*One of Canada's ice hockey gold medals was won during the 1920 Summer Olympics. This table includes this medal, resulting in the discrepancy between the medals by games and medals by sports tables.

Nordic combined and ski mountaineering are the only current winter sports and disciplines that Canada has never won a medal in.

- Canada has finished with the highest Canadian Winter medals total at the 2018 Winter Olympic Games with 29 medals. This represents Canada's second highest medal haul at the Olympics, behind the 44 of the Soviet-bloc-boycotted 1984 Summer Games.
- Canada has finished the 2010 Winter Olympics at the first place at the medal table, with 14 gold medals.
- Canada was the first nation to win 14 gold medals at a single Winter Games. In 2018, Germany and Norway matched this record. Then in 2022, Norway set a new record with 16.

== Olympians ==
- The Canadian with the most times at the Winter Olympics is Jasey-Jay Anderson, who appeared at 6 Olympics; 1998, 2002, 2006, 2010, 2014, 2018.
- The Canadian with the most Winter medals is Cindy Klassen, who has 6 medals; 1 gold, 3 silver, 2 bronze. While Canadian Winter Olympian Clara Hughes also has 6, her medals are split across Winter (4 medals) and Summer (2 medals) Games.
- The Canadian with the most medals at a single Winter Games is Cindy Klassen, who won 5 at the 2006 Games.

== Biathlon ==
Canada's only medals in biathlon were won by Myriam Bedard in the Albertville and Lillehammer games.

Games	Gold	Silver	Bronze	Total
1992 Albertville	0	0	1	1
1994 Lillehammer	2	0	0	2
Totals (2 entries)	2	0	1	3

== Bobsleigh ==
=== Bobsleigh ===
Canada has won five gold medals in bobsleigh. The first, a surprising victory by Vic Emery's four-man team in Innsbruck (1964). The second was won by Pierre Lueders and Dave MacEachern in the two-man event in Nagano (1998) - a race that produced a rare tie in which both the Canadian pair and an Italian pair were awarded gold (a German pair won bronze). The Canadian men's duo of Justin Kripps and Alexander Kopacz would repeat the feat in 2018, tying for gold with a German sled. In the first back to back wins by a two-woman team, Kaillie Humphries and Heather Moyse won gold medals in Vancouver (2010) and Sochi (2014).

Games	Gold	Silver	Bronze	Total
1964 Innsbruck	1	0	0	1
1998 Nagano	1	0	0	1
2006 Turin	0	1	0	1
2010 Vancouver*	1	1	1	3
2014 Sochi	1	0	0	1
2018 Pyeongchang	1	0	1	2
2022 Beijing	0	0	2	2
Totals (7 entries)	5	2	4	11

=== Skeleton ===
In the 2006 Turin games Mellisa Hollingsworth-Richards won Canada's first medal in skeleton and later Duff Gibson became the first Canadian to win a gold medal in skeleton in the men's event. At the 2010 Vancouver games, Jon Montgomery won a gold in the men's event.

Games	Gold	Silver	Bronze	Total
2006 Turin	1	1	1	3
2010 Vancouver*	1	0	0	1
Totals (2 entries)	2	1	1	4

== Curling ==
Curling is one of the most popular sports in Canada, and both the men's and women's teams have won a medal at each of the five Olympics curling has been held at so far. Canadian curlers also finished in the top 3 places when curling was a demonstration sport in 1988 and 1992. The women's team in 1998, led by skip Sandra Schmirler, the men's team in 2006, led by skip Brad Gushue, the men's team in 2010, led by Kevin Martin, the women's team in 2014 led by Jennifer Jones and the men's team in 2014 led by Brad Jacobs have won gold medals. In 2018, Kaitlyn Lawes and John Morris won gold in the first mixed doubles tournament at a Winter Olympics.

Games	Gold	Silver	Bronze	Total
1998 Nagano	1	1	0	2
2002 Salt Lake City	0	1	1	2
2006 Turin	1	0	1	2
2010 Vancouver*	1	1	0	2
2014 Sochi	2	0	0	2
2018 Pyeongchang	1	0	0	1
2022 Beijing	0	0	1	1
2026 Milano Cortina	1	0	1	2
Totals (8 entries)	7	3	4	14

== Ice hockey ==
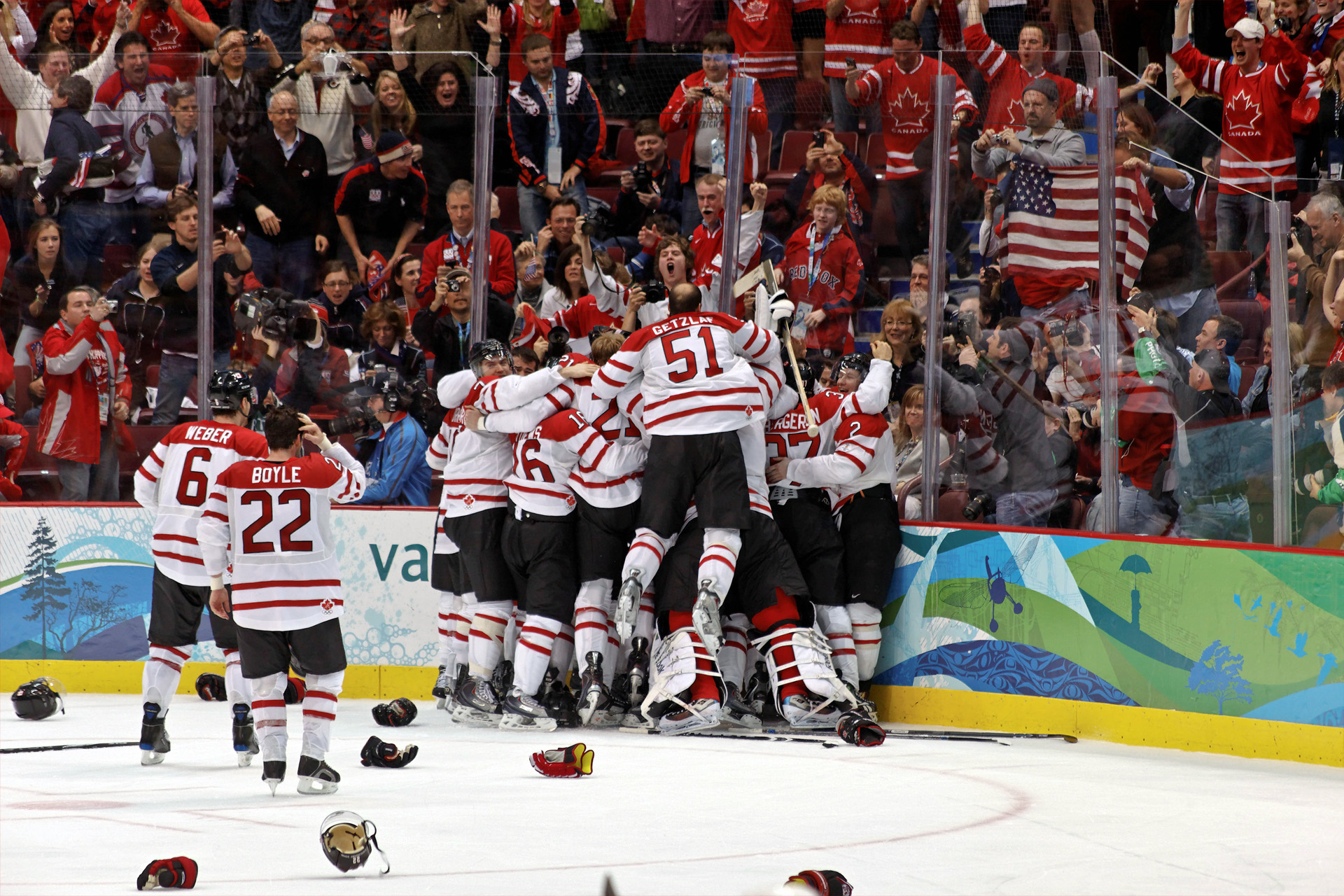
Canada men's national hockey team celebrating after winning the gold medal against USA in Vancouver 2010.

Hockey is Canada's national winter sport, and Canadians are extremely passionate about the game. The nation has traditionally done very well at the Olympic games, winning 6 of the first 7 gold medals. However, by 1956 its amateur club teams and national teams could not compete with the teams of government-supported players from the Soviet Union. When Canada's best players (from the National Hockey League) were able to compete starting in 1998, expectations were high for the country's return to glory, but the Czech Republic won gold and the team fell to Finland in the bronze medal game. Canada finally won its first hockey gold in 50 years in Salt Lake City in 2002, sparking national celebrations.

The 2010 games were the first Olympics to take place in an NHL market since the league's players started to compete in the games, as Vancouver is home to the Vancouver Canucks.

Women's ice hockey was introduced at the Nagano Olympics in 1998, with Canada winning the silver medal. Canada has appeared in every Olympic gold medal game, facing the United States six times (1998, 2002, 2010, 2014, 2018, 2022) and Sweden once (2006). Canada has topped the podium five times (2002, 2006, 2010, 2014, 2022), taking silver against the United States twice (1998, 2018).

Games	Gold	Silver	Bronze	Total
1920 Antwerp	1	0	0	1
1924 Chamonix	1	0	0	1
1928 St. Moritz	1	0	0	1
1932 Lake Placid	1	0	0	1
1936 Garmisch-Partenkirchen	0	1	0	1
1948 St. Moritz	1	0	0	1
1952 Oslo	1	0	0	1
1956 Cortina d'Ampezzo	0	0	1	1
1960 Squaw Valley	0	1	0	1
1968 Grenoble	0	0	1	1
1992 Albertville	0	1	0	1
1994 Lillehammer	0	1	0	1
1998 Nagano	0	1	0	1
2002 Salt Lake City	2	0	0	2
2006 Turin	1	0	0	1
2010 Vancouver*	2	0	0	2
2014 Sochi	2	0	0	2
2018 Pyeongchang	0	1	1	2
2022 Beijing	1	0	0	1
2026 Milano Cortina	0	2	0	2
Totals (20 entries)	14	8	3	25

Note: Ice hockey was part of the Summer Olympic program for the 1920 games in Antwerp, but is listed here for completeness. As it was held at a Summer Games, it is not counted in the total for Canada's performance at the Winter games.

== Luge ==
Following the announcement on December 22, 2017 that the 2014 luge team relay results of the silver medallists Russian team were voided due to team members being banned for doping violations, Canada was expected to be upgraded from fourth to bronze. However, the bans and annulment of results were successfully appealed at the Court of Arbitration for Sport, and on 1 February 2018 the results were restored. The IOC intended to appeal the decision to the Federal Supreme Court of Switzerland, however following the Court's upholding of the CAS' decision in the related case of Alexander Legkov, the IOC decided not to proceed with the appeal.

Alex Gough won Canada's first ever Olympic medal (Bronze) in Luge at the 2018 Winter Olympics in Pyeongchang.

Games	Gold	Silver	Bronze	Total
2018 Pyeongchang	0	1	1	2
Totals (1 entries)	0	1	1	2

== Skating ==
=== Figure skating ===
Canada has won at least one medal in figure skating in 14 of the 17 post-war Winter Olympic games (since 1948). Canada's gold medalists are Barbara Ann Scott (1948) and the pairs of Barbara Wagner and Robert Paul (1960); Jamie Salé and David Pelletier (2002); and Tessa Virtue and Scott Moir (2010 and 2018). Canada also won gold in the team event at the 2018 Winter Olympics in Pyeongchang. Virtue and Moir celebrated a number of firsts at the Vancouver 2010 Winter Olympics when they won the gold medal for Ice Dancing: their first gold medal at their first Olympics, and the first North Americans as well as the youngest pair to win gold in this event. Other notable Canadian skaters include 1976 Bronze medalist Toller Cranston, as well as Brian Orser and Elvis Stojko, both of whom won silver medals in successive games.

At the 1964 games, Canadians Debbi Wilkes and Guy Revell won bronze in the pairs event. However, the silver medalists from Germany were later disqualified when it was discovered that they had signed professional contracts prior to the Games. At the time, only amateurs were allowed to compete at the Olympics. As a result, the silver medals were transferred to Wilkes/Revell. The Germans were later re-awarded the silver medal in 1987 after an appeal. In December 2013, the IOC clarified that the Canadian pair had not been stripped of their silver medals when the Germans regained their medals. In November 2014, the IOC stated that both the German and Canadian pairs were silver medalists.

At the 2002 games, Canadians Jamie Salé and David Pelletier were initially awarded the silver medal in the pairs event. However, after the event had concluded allegations of vote swapping and buying of the votes of the French judge resulted in the IOC deciding that Salé and Pelletier would also be awarded gold medals, with the first place Russian skaters keeping their gold medals as joint champions.

At the 2022 games, Canada finished in fourth in the women's team event. After a positive doping test by a member of the gold medallist Russian team, the Court of Arbitration for Sport (CAS) disqualified her. As a result, Canada's team was expected to be upgraded to a bronze medal. However, on 30 January 2024 the ISU announced the medal reallocation, downgrading Russia to bronze and leaving Canada at fourth. This decision was appealed by Canada to the CAS, but the court dismissed the case with no changes to the rankings.

Games	Gold	Silver	Bronze	Total
1932 Lake Placid	0	0	1	1
1948 St. Moritz	1	0	1	2
1956 Cortina d'Ampezzo	0	1	0	1
1960 Squaw Valley	1	0	1	2
1964 Innsbruck	0	1	1	2
1972 Sapporo	0	1	0	1
1976 Innsbruck	0	0	1	1
1984 Sarajevo	0	1	0	1
1988 Calgary*	0	2	1	3
1992 Albertville	0	0	1	1
1994 Lillehammer	0	1	1	2
1998 Nagano	0	1	0	1
2002 Salt Lake City	1	0	0	1
2006 Turin	0	0	1	1
2010 Vancouver*	1	0	1	2
2014 Sochi	0	3	0	3
2018 Pyeongchang	2	0	2	4
2026 Milano Cortina	0	0	1	1
Totals (18 entries)	6	11	13	30

=== Short track speed skating ===
Canada has benefitted from the addition of short track speed skating to the Olympic program in 1992, winning multiple medals at each games since. Marc Gagnon, who won 3 gold and 2 bronze medals between 1994 and 2002 and François-Louis Tremblay, who has collected 2 gold, 2 silver and 1 bronze medals from 2002 to 2010, are among only 5 Canadian Olympians to win a total of 5 medals.

Games	Gold	Silver	Bronze	Total
1992 Albertville	1	2	0	3
1994 Lillehammer	0	2	1	3
1998 Nagano	2	0	2	4
2002 Salt Lake City	2	1	3	6
2006 Turin	0	3	1	4
2010 Vancouver*	2	2	1	5
2014 Sochi	1	1	1	3
2018 Pyeongchang	1	1	3	5
2022 Beijing	1	1	2	4
2026 Milano Cortina	1	2	2	5
Totals (10 entries)	11	15	16	42

=== Speed skating ===
Gaetan Boucher (1000 m and 1500 m in 1984), Catriona Le May Doan (500 m in 1998 and 2002), Cindy Klassen (1500 m in 2006), Clara Hughes (5000 m in 2006), Christine Nesbitt (1000 m in 2010) and Ted-Jan Bloemen (10000 m in 2018) are Canada's gold medalists in speed skating. In 2006, Cindy Klassen became the first Canadian to ever win five medals in one winter games, winning one gold (1500 m), two silver (Team Pursuit and 1000 m) and two bronze medals (3000 m and 5000 m). She also won a bronze medal in the 2002 games, giving her 6 medals, surpassing short track speed skater Marc Gagnon for the title of most decorated Canadian Winter Olympian. However, Clara Hughes was able to tie Klassen's record following her bronze medal in 2010. In addition to this, Hughes won 2 bronze medals at the 1996 Summer Olympics, one in 2002 Winter Olympics (making her the first Canadian to have won a medal in both the Summer and Winter Olympics), and two in 2006.

Games	Gold	Silver	Bronze	Total
1932 Lake Placid	0	1	4	5
1952 Oslo	0	0	1	1
1976 Innsbruck	0	1	0	1
1980 Lake Placid	0	1	0	1
1984 Sarajevo	2	0	1	3
1994 Lillehammer	0	1	0	1
1998 Nagano	1	2	2	5
2002 Salt Lake City	1	0	2	3
2006 Turin	2	4	2	8
2010 Vancouver*	2	1	2	5
2014 Sochi	0	1	1	2
2018 Pyeongchang	1	1	0	2
2022 Beijing	1	3	1	5
2026 Milano Cortina	1	1	3	5
Totals (14 entries)	11	17	19	47

== Skiing ==
=== Alpine skiing ===
Canada's most celebrated alpine skier is Nancy Greene, who won gold and silver at the 1968 games in Grenoble.

Games	Gold	Silver	Bronze	Total
1956 Cortina d'Ampezzo	0	0	1	1
1960 Squaw Valley	1	0	0	1
1968 Grenoble	1	1	0	2
1976 Innsbruck	1	0	0	1
1980 Lake Placid	0	0	1	1
1988 Calgary*	0	0	2	2
1992 Albertville	1	0	0	1
1994 Lillehammer	0	0	1	1
2014 Sochi	0	0	1	1
2022 Beijing	0	0	1	1
Totals (10 entries)	4	1	7	12

=== Cross country skiing ===
Canada's first medal in cross country skiing was won by Beckie Scott in the women's 2 × 5 km pursuit event at the 2002 games in Salt Lake City. This represented the first time a North American woman won an Olympic medal in the sport. While she was originally awarded the bronze medal, after the first and second place finishers were disqualified for doping violations she was upgraded to gold.

Chandra Crawford followed this up at the next games with a gold medal in the sprint event, and the team of Scott and Sara Renner also won a silver medal in Turin (2006).

Games	Gold	Silver	Bronze	Total
2002 Salt Lake City	1	0	0	1
2006 Turin	1	1	0	2
Totals (2 entries)	2	1	0	3

=== Freestyle skiing ===
Canada has enjoyed success in freestyle skiing after its introduction to the Winter Olympics in 1992. Jean-Luc Brassard (1994), Jennifer Heil (2006), Alexandre Bilodeau (2010 & 2014), Justine Dufour-Lapointe (2014), and Mikael Kingsbury (2018) have won gold in the moguls event. Canada has won gold in the women's ski cross at every olympics that featured it (Ashleigh McIvor, 2010; Marielle Thompson, 2014; and Kelsey Serwa, 2018). Brady Leman (2018) won gold in the men's ski cross event. In 2014 and 2018 the Canadian women also took the silver medals (Serwa in 2014, and Brittany Phelan in 2018). Dara Howell took gold in the slopestyle event in 2014. Cassie Sharpe added a halfpipe gold in 2018.

Games	Gold	Silver	Bronze	Total
1994 Lillehammer	1	1	1	3
2002 Salt Lake City	0	1	1	2
2006 Turin	1	0	0	1
2010 Vancouver*	2	1	0	3
2014 Sochi	4	4	1	9
2018 Pyeongchang	4	2	1	7
2022 Beijing	0	3	2	5
2026 Milano Cortina	2	1	2	5
Totals (8 entries)	14	13	8	35

Canadian skiers also finished in the top 3 positions in aerials at the 1988 and 1992 games, when it was a demonstration sport.

=== Nordic combined ===
Canada has never won an Olympic medal in the Nordic combined competition. Their best finish was tenth in the individual normal hill competition at the 1932 games.

=== Ski jumping ===
Canada won the bronze medal in the mixed team ski jumping event at the 2022 Winter Olympics.

Games	Gold	Silver	Bronze	Total
2022 Beijing	0	0	1	1
Totals (1 entries)	0	0	1	1

=== Snowboarding ===
Ross Rebagliati won a gold medal in giant slalom snowboarding when the sport made its Olympic debut at the 1998 Nagano games. Initially he was stripped of the medal when traces of marijuana were found in his blood during a drug test. However, a few days later the IOC reversed its decision after an appeal, because marijuana was only a restricted substance, not a banned substance.

Games	Gold	Silver	Bronze	Total
1998 Nagano	1	0	0	1
2006 Turin	0	0	1	1
2010 Vancouver*	2	1	0	3
2014 Sochi	0	1	1	2
2018 Pyeongchang	1	2	1	4
2022 Beijing	1	1	4	6
2026 Milano Cortina	0	1	0	1
Totals (7 entries)	5	6	7	18

== Ski mountaineering ==
Canada has never qualified to compete in ski mountaineering at the Olympic games since its addition to the program in 2026.

== See also ==
- Canada at the Summer Olympics
- Own the Podium - Canada's government-sponsored program to win more medals
