= Bert McCaffrey =

Canadian ice hockey player (1893–1955)

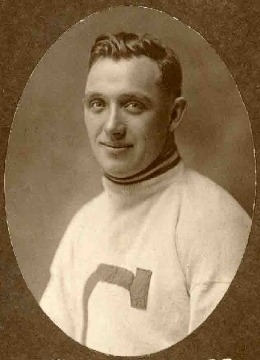
- McCaffrey with the Toronto Granites.
- Born: April 12, 1893 Lockton, Albion Township, Peel County, Ontario, Canada
- Died: April 15, 1955 (aged 62) Toronto, Ontario, Canada
- Height: 5 ft 10 in (178 cm)
- Weight: 180 lb (82 kg; 12 st 12 lb)
- Position: Right wing/Defence
- Shot: Right
- Played for: Pittsburgh Pirates; Toronto St. Pats; Toronto Maple Leafs; Montreal Canadiens
- National team: Canada
- Playing career: 1916–1933
Medal record
Men's ice hockey
Representing Canada
Gold medal – first place	1924 Chamonix	Team competition

John Albert McCaffrey (April 12, 1893 — April 15, 1955) was a Canadian ice hockey defenceman who played seven seasons in the National Hockey League for the Toronto St. Pats, Toronto Maple Leafs, Pittsburgh Pirates and Montreal Canadiens.

McCaffrey won a Stanley Cup in 1930 with the Montreal Canadiens. He played in 22 of 44 regular season for Montreal during the 1930–31 NHL season.

Prior to joining the NHL, McCaffrey played eight seasons of senior hockey in the Ontario Hockey Association, including four with the Toronto Granites, winning two Allan Cups in 1922 and 1923. By virtue of playing for the reigning senior amateur champions, McCaffrey and the Granites represented Canada at the 1924 Winter Olympics in Chamonix, France. He scored 20 goals in five games as the Canadians dominated the tournament, winning the gold medal.

McCaffrey was born in Lockton, Albion Township, Peel County, Ontario in 1893 but is erroneously listed in numerous resources as being from Chesley. and died in Toronto in 1955.

In 2024 he was inducted in the Caledon Sports Hall of Fame.

== Career statistics ==
=== Regular season and playoffs ===
			Regular season					Playoffs
Season	Team	League	GP	G	A	Pts	PIM	GP	G	A	Pts	PIM
1915–16	Chelsea ACC	OHA Int	—	—	—	—	—	—	—	—	—	—
1916–17	Toronto Riversides	OHA Sr	8	9	0	9	—	2	1	0	1	4
1917–18	Toronto Crescents	OHS Sr	9	23	0	23	—	—	—	—	—	—
1918–19	Toronto Dentals	OHA Sr	6	7	1	8	—	2	0	0	0	—
1919–20	Parkdale Canoe Club	OHA Sr	6	6	3	9	—	1	1	1	2	—
1920–21	Toronto Granites	OHA Sr	10	1	3	4	—	2	0	2	2	—
1921–22	Toronto Granites	OHA Sr	10	5	8	13	—	2	3	2	5	—
1921–22	Toronto Granites	Al-Cup	—	—	—	—	—	6	5	2	7	—
1922–23	Toronto Granites	OHA Sr	12	10	4	14	—	2	0	0	0	2
1922–23	Toronto Granites	Al-Cup	—	—	—	—	—	6	6	2	8	6
1923–24	Toronto Granites	Exhib	14	18	10	28	—	—	—	—	—	—
1924–25	Toronto St. Pats	NHL	30	10	6	16	12	2	1	0	1	4
1925–26	Toronto St. Pats	NHL	36	14	7	21	42	—	—	—	—	—
1926–27	Toronto St. Pats/Maple Leafs	NHL	43	5	5	10	43	—	—	—	—	—
1927–28	Toronto Maple Leafs	NHL	9	1	1	2	9	—	—	—	—	—
1927–28	Pittsburgh Pirates	NHL	35	6	3	9	14	—	—	—	—	—
1928–29	Pittsburgh Pirates	NHL	42	1	0	1	34	—	—	—	—	—
1929–30	Pittsburgh Pirates	NHL	15	3	4	7	12	—	—	—	—	—
1929–30	Montreal Canadiens	NHL	28	1	3	4	26	6	1	1	2	6
1930–31	Montreal Canadiens	NHL	22	2	1	3	10	—	—	—	—	—
1930–31	Providence Reds	Can-Am	20	6	2	8	24	2	2	1	3	2
1931–32	Philadelphia Arrows	Can-Am	35	7	9	16	26	—	—	—	—	—
1932–33	Philadelphia Arrows	Can-Am	7	1	0	1	2	—	—	—	—	—
NHL totals			260	43	30	73	202	8	2	1	3	10

=== International ===
Year	Team	Event	GP	G	A	Pts	PIM
1924	Canada	OLY	5	21	15	36	—
Senior totals			5	21	15	36	—
