= Romeril =

Romeril is a surname. Notable people with the surname include:

- Alex Romeril (1893–1968), Canadian ice hockey player, football player, referee, and coach
- Herbert Romeril (1881–1963), English politician
- John Romeril (born 1945), Australian playwright
