= Dunc Munro =

Scottish-Canadian ice hockey player (1901–1958)

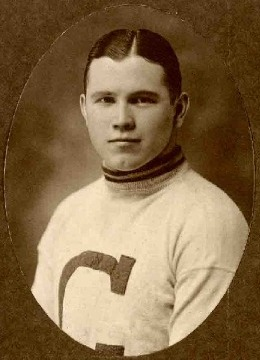
- Munro with the Toronto Granites.
- Born: January 19, 1901 Moray, Scotland, U.K.
- Died: January 3, 1958 (aged 56) Montreal, Quebec, Canada
- Height: 5 ft 8 in (173 cm)
- Weight: 190 lb (86 kg; 13 st 8 lb)
- Position: Defence
- Shot: Left
- Played for: Montreal Maroons; Montreal Canadiens
- National team: Canada
- Playing career: 1920–1932
Medal record
Olympic Games
| Gold medal – first place | 1924 Chamonix | Team |

Duncan Brown Munro (January 19, 1901 – January 3, 1958) was a Canadian Olympic ice hockey player who played with and coached the Montreal Maroons. He was born in Moray, Scotland. When he was still a child his family moved to Toronto, Ontario, where he learned to play hockey. He is the first European born player to win the Stanley Cup. In his youth Munro also excelled in track events as a runner. He attended the University of Toronto Schools, where he played on the hockey team that won the first Memorial Cup.

== Playing career ==
=== 1924 Winter Olympics ===
Before the NHL, he played for the Toronto Granites, a team that featured future Hockey Hall of Famer Hooley Smith. This team won the gold medal in the 1924 Winter Olympics. Team Captain Munro scored 18 goals in the Olympic tournament, which saw the Canadians outscore their combined opponents by a total of 110 to 3. As a result of the team's winning the gold medal, there was considerable interest to sign players from the team and Munro was quickly signed up by the newly formed Montreal Maroons.

=== NHL ===
The Montreal Maroons won the Stanley Cup in their inaugural season. The Maroons had a strong defense, led by the team's captain Munro and featuring Red Dutton and Reg Noble. They gave up few chances to opposing players. The Maroons went on to make the finals in 1928, but lost to the New York Rangers.

The following season Munro suffered a heart attack that hospitalized him, and while in hospital contracted pneumonia. His absence was felt and the Maroons fell to the bottom of the Canadian Division of the NHL. It was said that the Maroons players were as interested in the stock market as they were in hockey and Munro was amongst the most avid of the speculators. He had signed a large contract and was a shrewd investor, but ultimately lost a fortune when the stock market crashed.

Munro recovered his health in time for the 1929–30 season and was named player-coach upon his return. He took the Maroons from worst to first in the Canadian Division that year. The following year the Maroons signed nearly the entire Montreal A.A.A. Allan Cup team and the team sagged, and before the season ended, he was fired as coach, replaced by George "Buck" Boucher. He played his last season with the Montreal Canadiens in 1931–32.

== Later life ==
Having suffered several heart attacks over the years, Dunc Munro died in Montreal on January 3, 1958, at age 56.

== Career statistics ==
| | | | Regular season | | | | | Playoffs |
| Season | Team | League | GP | G | A | Pts | PIM | GP | G | A | Pts | PIM |
|---|---|---|---|---|---|---|---|---|---|---|---|---|
| 1918–19 | U. of Toronto Schools | OHA-Jr. | — | — | — | — | — | — | — | — | — | — |
| 1918–19 | U. of Toronto Schools | M-Cup | — | — | — | — | — | — | — | — | — | — |
| 1919–20 | U. of Toronto Schools | OHA-Jr. | — | — | — | — | — | — | — | — | — | — |
| 1920–21 | Toronto Granites | OHA-Sr. | 8 | 4 | 5 | 9 | — | 2 | 1 | 0 | 1 | — |
| 1921–22 | Toronto Granites | OHA-Sr. | 10 | 4 | 6 | 10 | — | 2 | 2 | 1 | 3 | — |
| 1921–22 | Toronto Granites | A-Cup | — | — | — | — | — | 6 | 3 | 3 | 6 | — |
| 1922–23 | Toronto Granites | OHA-Sr. | 12 | 7 | 7 | 14 | — | 2 | 2 | 0 | 2 | 4 |
| 1923–24 | Toronto Granites | Exhib. | 15 | 9 | 5 | 14 | — | — | — | — | — | — |
| 1924–25 | Montreal Maroons | NHL | 27 | 5 | 1 | 6 | 16 | — | — | — | — | — |
| 1925–26 | Montreal Maroons | NHL | 33 | 4 | 6 | 10 | 55 | 2 | 0 | 0 | 0 | 0 |
| 1925–26 | Montreal Maroons | St-Cup | — | — | — | — | — | 4 | 1 | 0 | 1 | 6 |
| 1926–27 | Montreal Maroons | NHL | 43 | 6 | 5 | 11 | 42 | 2 | 0 | 0 | 0 | 4 |
| 1927–28 | Montreal Maroons | NHL | 43 | 5 | 2 | 7 | 35 | 9 | 0 | 2 | 2 | 8 |
| 1928–29 | Montreal Maroons | NHL | 1 | 0 | 0 | 0 | 0 | — | — | — | — | — |
| 1929–30 | Montreal Maroons | NHL | 40 | 7 | 2 | 9 | 10 | 4 | 2 | 0 | 2 | 4 |
| 1930–31 | Montreal Maroons | NHL | 4 | 0 | 1 | 1 | 0 | — | — | — | — | — |
| 1931–32 | Montreal Canadiens | NHL | 48 | 1 | 1 | 2 | 14 | 4 | 0 | 0 | 0 | 2 |
| OHA-Sr. totals | | | 30 | 15 | 18 | 33 | — | 6 | 5 | 1 | 6 | — |
| NHL totals | | | 239 | 28 | 18 | 46 | 172 | 21 | 2 | 2 | 4 | 18 |

== NHL coaching record ==
| Team | Year | Regular season | | | | | | Postseason |
| Team | Year | G | W | L | T | Pts | Division rank | Result |
|---|---|---|---|---|---|---|---|---|
| Montreal Maroons | 1929–30 | 44 | 23 | 16 | 5 | 51 | 1st in Canadian | Lost in semi-finals |
| Montreal Maroons | 1930–31 | 32 | 14 | 13 | 5 | 33 | 3rd in Canadian | Fired |
| NHL Total | | 76 | 37 | 29 | 10 | | | |

== See also ==
- List of National Hockey League players from the United Kingdom

| Preceded by Punch Broadbent | Montreal Maroons captain 1925–28 | Succeeded by Nels Stewart |
| Preceded by Eddie Gerard | Head coach of the Montreal Maroons; 1929–30 | Succeeded by Georges Boucher |
