= Beattie Ramsay =

Canadian ice hockey player (1895–1952)

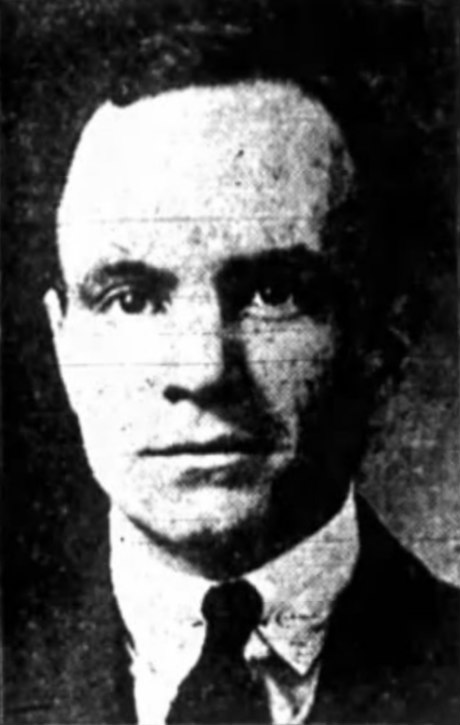
- Beattie Ramsay
- Born: December 12, 1895 Lumsden, Saskatchewan, Canada
- Died: September 30, 1952 (aged 56) Regina, Saskatchewan, Canada
- Height: 5 ft 7 in (170 cm)
- Weight: 145 lb (66 kg; 10 st 5 lb)
- Position: Defence
- Shot: Left
- National team: Canada
- Playing career: 1922–1928
Medal record
Olympic Games
Gold medal – first place	1924 Chamonix	Team

William Beattie Ramsay (December 12, 1895 – September 30, 1952) was a Canadian ice hockey player. He won an Olympic gold medal as a member of the Toronto Granites ice hockey team that represented Canada in ice hockey at the 1924 Winter Olympics. He later played 43 games in the National Hockey League with the Toronto Maple Leafs during the 1927–28 season.

Ramsay great granddaughter Shannon Woeller is a professional soccer player and represents Canada at international level.

== Career statistics ==
=== Regular season and playoffs ===
			Regular season					Playoffs
Season	Team	League	GP	G	A	Pts	PIM	GP	G	A	Pts	PIM
1919–20	University of Toronto	CIAUC	6	3	2	5	—	6	4	4	8	—
1920–21	University of Toronto	CIAUC	10	5	4	9	—	3	0	1	1	—
1920–21	University of Toronto	Al-Cup	—	—	—	—	—	5	6	2	8	—
1921–22	University of Toronto	CIAUC	10	11	4	15	—	—	—	—	—	—
1922–23	Toronto Granites	OHA Sr	—	—	—	—	—	2	0	0	0	0
1922–23	University of Toronto	Al-Cup	—	—	—	—	—	6	3	3	6	0
1923–24	Toronto Granites	Exhib	12	7	7	14	—	—	—	—	—	—
1927–28	Toronto Maple Leafs	NHL	43	0	2	2	10	—	—	—	—	—
NHL totals			43	0	2	2	10	—	—	—	—	—

=== International ===
Year	Team	Event	GP	G	A	Pts	PIM
1924	Canada	OLY	5	10	0	10	—
Senior totals			5	10	0	10	—

== Head coaching record ==
Record table
Season	Team	Overall	Conference	Standing	Postseason
Princeton Tigers (THL) (1924–1926)
1924–25	Princeton	8–9–0	0–4–0		
1925–26	Princeton	7–9–0			
Princeton Tigers Independent (1926–1927)
1926–27	Princeton	5–7–1			
Total:		20–25–1			
National champion Postseason invitational champion Conference regular season champion Conference regular season and conference tournament champion Division regular season champion Division regular season and conference tournament champion Conference tournament champion
