= Colin Carruthers =

British ice hockey player

- Born: 17 September 1890; Ontario, Canada
- Died: 10 November 1957 (aged 67); Canada
- Relatives: Eric Carruthers (brother)
Ice hockey career
- Played for: British Olympic team (1924 and 1928)
- National team: United Kingdom
Medal record
Men's ice hockey
Representing Great Britain
Olympic Games
Bronze medal – third place	1924 Chamonix	Team competition

Colin Gordon Carruthers (17 September 1890 – 10 November 1957) was a British ice hockey player who competed in the 1924 Winter Olympics and in the 1928 Winter Olympics.

He was born in Ontario, Canada and died in Canada.

In 1924 he was a member of the British ice hockey team, which won the bronze medal.

Four years later he finished fourth with the British team in the 1928 Olympic tournament.

His younger brother Eric was also a team member in both competitions.
