= S Line (ice hockey) =

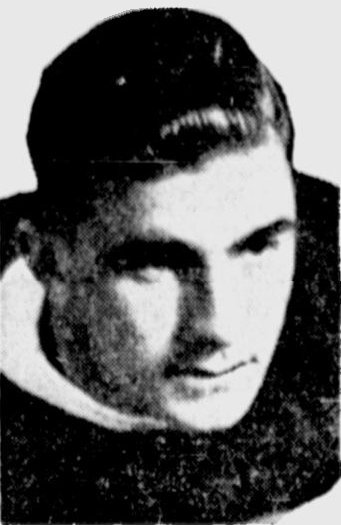
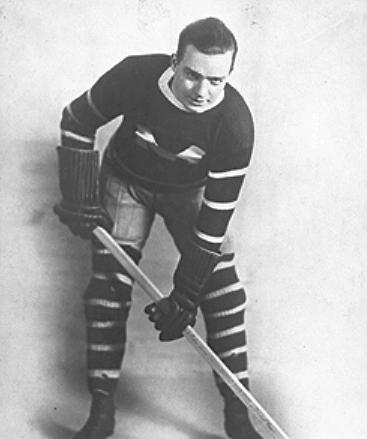
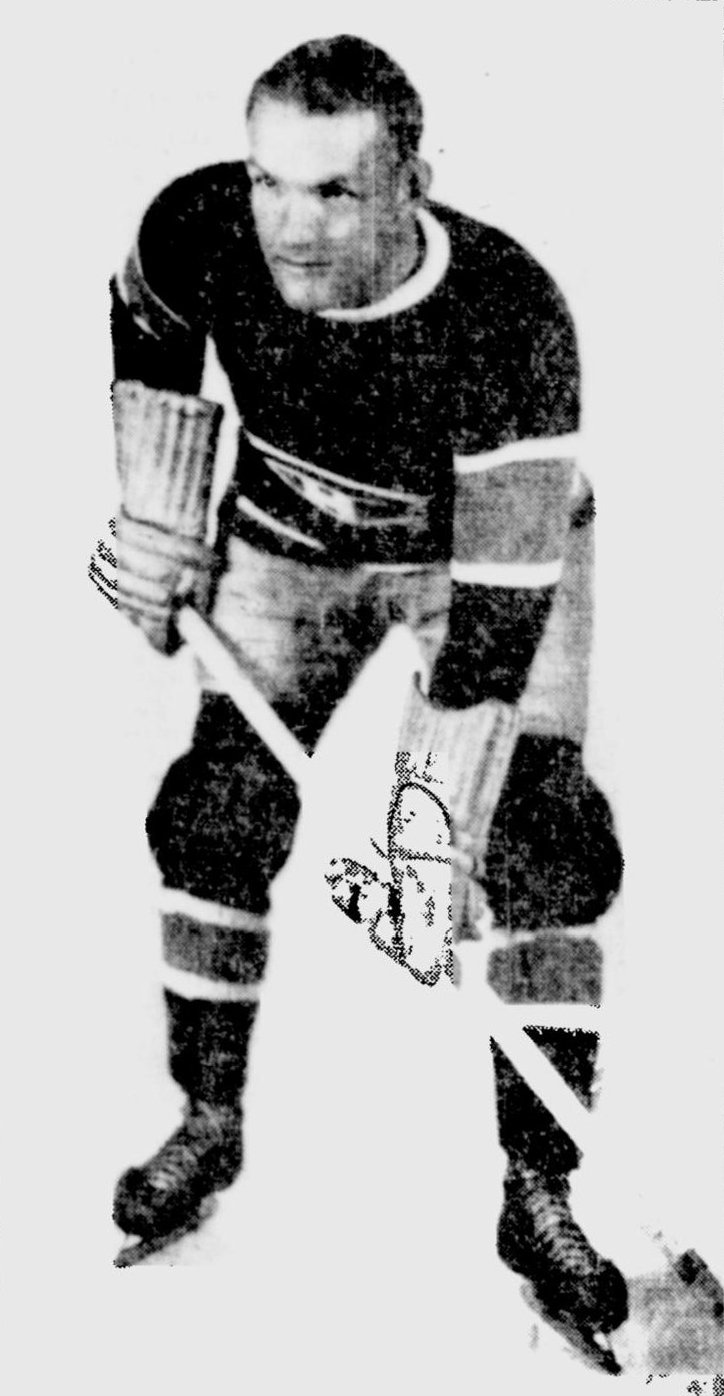
Left-to-right: Smith, Stewart, Siebert

The S Line was a line of professional ice hockey forwards who played together for the Montreal Maroons in the National Hockey League from the late 1920s to the early 1930s. The nickname was a reference to the players' last names: centre Nels Stewart played with Babe Siebert and Hooley Smith on his wings. All three are in the Hockey Hall of Fame.

The line was also sometimes called the "Three S Line", "Triple S Line", or "Big S Line".

== Beginnings ==
Both Stewart and Siebert started their careers with the Maroons in 1925, and won the 1926 Stanley Cup with them at the end of that season. Smith started with the original Ottawa Senators, and won a Stanley Cup with them in 1927, but by that time the club was in financial trouble and began selling off their stars. Smith was sold to the Maroons, where he was put on a line with Stewart and Siebert. Sportswriters immediately dubbed them the "Three S Line".

== A line feared by all ==
From their first season together, the trio was an offensive force feared by opposing netminders and players alike. They were not only the top three scorers on the Maroons that season (Stewart with 34 points, Smith 19, and Siebert 17), but Siebert and Stewart also led the team in penalty minutes, with 119 and 106, respectively, and ranked 4th and 5th in the entire NHL.

Over the next three seasons, the S line was easily the Maroons' most productive in terms of points, and the three players combined for over 200 penalty minutes every year.

Stewart once stated that Siebert and Smith "did most of the digging [for the puck] work. They knew I was out there waiting, and if they freed the puck, I'd do the rest."

== End of the line ==
By the 1931–32 NHL season, the Maroons were struggling financially amid the Great Depression. It was also the first season of Stewart's career in which he did not lead his team in scoring; that statistic went to Dave Trottier. The team finished the year 19-22-7 with 45 points, 6th-best of the 8 teams in the NHL at that point. At the end of the season, Stewart and Siebert were both sold to other teams for cash, and the S Line was no more. Smith stayed with the Maroons and was their captain when the team won its final Stanley Cup in 1935.

All three players were posthumously inducted into the Hockey Hall of Fame.
