= Alex Romeril =

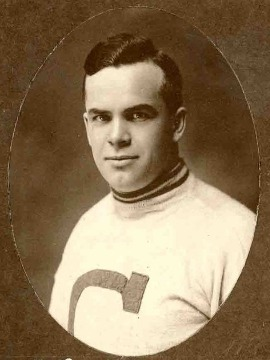
Romeril with the Toronto Granites.

Alexander Edward "Porky" Romeril (December 29, 1893 – May 17, 1968) was a Canadian amateur ice hockey player, football player, National Hockey League referee, and the first coach of the Toronto Maple Leafs.

== Career ==
Romeril played junior hockey with the Toronto Canoe Club, winning the Ontario Hockey Association championship in 1912 with Romeril playing rover. He was offered $70 a week to turn professional with the Toronto Blueshirts in 1912–13, but declined and played for the TCC senior team. During the First World War, Romeril played senior hockey with the Winnipeg 61st Battalion, winning the Allan Cup in 1916.

After the war, Romeril played left wing for the senior OHA team from the Toronto Granite Club, called the Toronto Granites. Led by centre Harry Watson, the Granites won the Allan Cup in 1922 and 1923 (Romeril was injured and couldn't play in the 1923 series). In 1923–24, Romeril played for Toronto Aura Lee, and then played for the Parkdale Canoe Club team in 1924–25.

At the same time, Romeril was playing football before the start of hockey season for the Toronto Argonauts. He played from 1920 to 1922 and then returned to manage the team in 1924.

In February 1927, Romeril was named head coach of the Toronto Maple Leafs of the National Hockey League after the Toronto St. Patricks were acquired by a group headed by Conn Smythe and renamed the Maple Leafs. He coached the team through the rest of the 1926–27 season. Romeril then became an NHL referee until retiring in 1934.

He was also a strong golfer, competing in Toronto-area tournaments and serving as captain at the Rosedale Golf Club.

Romeril is buried at Park Lawn Cemetery in Toronto.

== Coaching record ==
Team	Year	Regular Season							Post Season
Team	Year	G	W	L	T	OTL	Pts	Finish	Result
TOR	1926–27	13	7	5	1	-	(35)	5th in Canadian	Did not qualify

Preceded by Mike Rodden	Head coach of the Toronto Maple Leafs; 1927	Succeeded by Conn Smythe
