= Nels Stewart =

Canadian ice hockey player (1899–1957)

- Hockey Hall of Fame, 1962
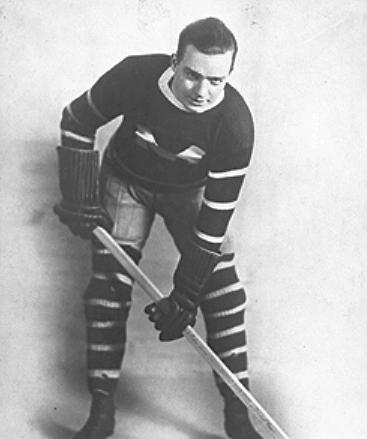
- Nels Stewart in a Montreal Maroons uniform
- Born: December 29, 1899 Montreal, Quebec, Canada
- Died: August 21, 1957 (aged 57) Wasaga Beach, Ontario, Canada
- Height: 6 ft 1 in (185 cm)
- Weight: 200 lb (91 kg; 14 st 4 lb)
- Position: Centre
- Shot: Left
- Played for: Montreal Maroons; Boston Bruins; New York Americans
- Playing career: 1925–1940

Robert Nelson "Old Poison" Stewart (December 29, 1899 – August 21, 1957) was a Canadian professional ice hockey player who played for the Montreal Maroons, New York Americans and Boston Bruins in the National Hockey League (NHL). He is an Honoured Member of the Hockey Hall of Fame. He was the first player to win the NHL's Hart Trophy multiple times, and is considered the NHL's greatest goalscorer in the pre-World War II era, holding the league record for career goals from 1937 to 1952.

== Playing career ==
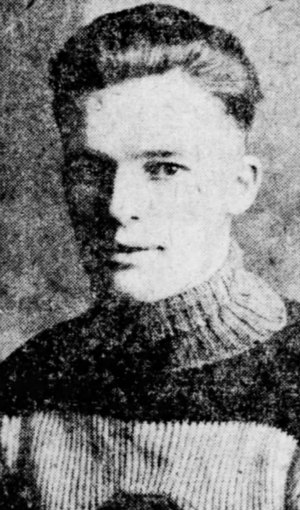
Stewart while a member of the Cleveland HC in the USAHA.

Born in Montreal, Quebec, Nels Stewart moved to Toronto as a boy, learning his hockey in the city leagues and outdoor ponds. At 18, he signed with the Cleveland Indians of the United States Amateur Hockey Association, leading the league in goals scored in four out of the five seasons he played before he and Babe Siebert were signed by the expansion Montreal Maroons of the NHL in 1925.

Nicknamed "Old Poison," and with Siebert and veteran stars Clint Benedict, Punch Broadbent and Reg Noble, he would lead the Maroons to the Stanley Cup championship that season. Stewart himself led the league in goal- and point-scoring that year, and became one of the few rookies in history to win the Hart Memorial Trophy as the NHL's Most Valuable Player.

Stewart would later center the legendary "S Line", with Hooley Smith and Siebert, and star for the Maroons for seven seasons in all, winning a second Hart Trophy in 1930, having led the league once more with 39 goals in 44 games. As the Great Depression deepened, though, the Maroons had increasing financial problems — eventually folding in 1938 — and sold Stewart to the Boston Bruins for cash. His glittering play continued for the Bruins, finishing second in team scoring each of his three full seasons with the team, despite being moved back to defense a fair bit.

In 1935, he was traded to the New York Americans, with whom he played for most of his final five seasons in the league. Stewart starred through his penultimate season (in which he was fourth on the Amerks in scoring) with 35 points in 46 games at age 36. The season following, in 1939, his foot speed (never regarded as fast) deserted him entirely. He retired thereafter as the NHL's career leading goal scorer, a mark he set in the 1937 season and held until Maurice Richard broke it in 1952.

On August 21, 1957, he was found dead at his summer home in Wasaga Beach, Ontario, apparently of natural causes, possibly a heart attack.

Stewart was inducted into the Hockey Hall of Fame in 1952.

In 1998, he was ranked number 51 on The Hockey News' list of the 100 Greatest Hockey Players.

== Playing style ==
I cannot recall any great pro who seemingly put less effort into his play and yet who came up with as much success as this 200-pound star...I would have to rate Nels Stewart the brainiest player I have ever known.

— Frank Selke describes Stewarts intelligence and reputation as a “coaster”

Hampered throughout his career by sluggish skating ability, which was often mistaken for a lack of effort, Stewart was rarely prone to the end-to-end rushes favoured by the other greats of the 1920s and 30s. Unlike Howie Morenz, Frank Fredrickson or Aurèle Joliat, he resorted to – and perfected – a hard-hitting style of play, with emphasis on collecting rebounds and scoring from bad angles around the crease. Bruins goaltender Tiny Thompson claimed that Stewart was hockey's most dangerous goal scorer around the net – when the latter was 34 years old and near retirement – while Art Ross referred to him as “the greatest inside player in the game”. A few players from previous decades like Pud Glass, similarly lacking in finesse or all-around talent but possessing strength, good balance and a hard shot, had made their living by playing a hard-nosed “garbage-collector” style. However, Stewart was the first to gain superstar status via this mode of play, and he paved the way for future garbage men like Gordie Drillon, Wally Hergesheimer, Phil Esposito and Tim Kerr.

Notwithstanding his reputation as a cumbersome skater, Stewart was used as a defenseman by the Maroons in his rookie season before making the transition to centre. For eight playoff games, including four in the 1926 Stanley Cup Final, Stewart served ably on the back end, where his physical presence and shiftiness kept the opposition hemmed in. His skating was often described as “lazy”, “careless” and “lackadaisical”. Nevertheless, as a defenceman Stewart was able to score 7 of his team's 11 goals during their Finals matchup against the Victoria Cougars, including all four game-winning tallies, and several of his rushes were remarked upon. In general, it appears that Stewart was at worst a middling skater, and at best quite an agile and deceptive one, using “long, swerving strokes” to deke opposing defencemen.

Stewart's fame, however, rested squarely on his abilities as a clutch goal scorer around the net. He frequently had multiple-goal games, once marking 4 tallies against the Toronto St. Pats, and was often at the top of the scoring race in his early seasons. This was partially due to his exceptionally hard and “heavy” shot, which was known to have injured several goalies due to its high trajectory. Notably, during the 1928 postseason, a Stewart shot caught Rangers goaltender Lorne Chabot in the left eye, giving him a hemorrhage.

Stewart used his shot frequently from close-in, drifting around the crease and waiting patiently to receive a pass before burying it in the net. He had remarkable balance on his skates, as well as tremendous hand-eye coordination. This was demonstrated perfectly in his inaugural Stanley Cup Final against Victoria. In the first game of the series, Stewart was rushing the puck up ice when he was knocked flat by a heavy check from Cougars captain Clem Loughlin. Separated from the puck by five feet and sliding prone across the ice, Stewart nevertheless managed to hook the rubber with his stick and poke it past Victoria goalie Hap Holmes for the leading goal. In the second game, Stewart was body checked by two Victoria players at once. Wildly off-balance, he managed to stay on one foot and fire another hard shot past Holmes.

Thereafter, Stewart was notoriously difficult to knock off the puck, and could even propel it into the net one-handed – sometimes by steadying himself on the crossbar with his other hand and much to the irritation of opposing goaltenders. This was aided further by his use of a heavy stick with a lie of 10", almost L-shaped, enabling him to keep the puck close to his feet.

Notwithstanding Stewart's accuracy and power, his best asset – and one that added to his reputation as a coaster – was an ability to collect rebounds. In the second period of the fourth and deciding game against Victoria in 1926, Stewart joined a rush which saw Hap Holmes stop four shots in rapid succession, all from the left side. With the entire Victoria defence having moved over to block for Holmes, Stewart corralled a rebound, skirted behind the right side of the net and picked the top-left corner with a backhand shot. Sixteen minutes later in the period, he grabbed one of his own rebounds and repeated the feat, again hitting the left corner.

I remember we had an old-timers game for charity, and I was playing with Nels. The puck came to Nels from behind the net, and he was out in front – where he usually was when he was playing in the National Hockey League. And what he did to that goalkeeper was just shameful, it made him look so silly. He just turned him inside out…it was a masterpiece, something I’d never seen before.

— Ted “Teeder” Kennedy on Stewart’s net-front presence

As a large, heavy centre who used his size and grit to complement his scoring touch, Nels Stewart soon developed a ferocious reputation as both a fighter and an effective pest. He chewed tobacco constantly, and while hovering around the crease would spit the juice into opposing goaltenders’ eyes. Stewart would readily stand up for his teammates, and fought consistently as a result – he led the NHL in penalty minutes with 133 in 1927, edging out famed bruiser Eddie Shore by 3 minutes. He was equally infamous for using his stick to ward off opponents, liberally dishing out two-handed slashes across the wrists and ankles of those who he felt were being too rough. This resulted in several famous bouts, including one with Hall of Fame defenceman and Maple Leafs strongman Red Horner.

== Influence on Ted Kennedy ==
After retirement, Stewart spent a period of time coaching the Port Colborne Sailors, where he encountered a young Ted Kennedy in 1942-43. As was the case with Stewart, Kennedy was not a particularly fast skater, but like Stewart he also possessed fine balance and stickhandling ability. Stewart confided in his young trainee that to compensate for his lack of speed, he would need to become an expert playmaker, learning how to work from the corners. He drilled Kennedy prodigiously in passing, as well as how to have an effective net-front presence. These two skillsets would become hallmarks of Kennedy's game, leading him to captaincy of the Maple Leafs, a Stanley Cup dynasty and lasting fame as one of the greatest Leafs to ever play. Stewart's use of an upright lie on his blade also seems to have had an influence on Kennedy, who used a similarly L-shaped stick.

== Career achievements and facts ==
- Won the Hart Trophy in 1926 and 1930.
- Led NHL in scoring in 1926.
- Played in the 1934 Ace Bailey Benefit All-Star Game.
- Led the playoffs in scoring in 1926 with six goals and three assists for nine points in eight games.
- Led the league in penalty minutes in 1927 with 133.
- Holds the NHL record for fastest two goals (four seconds apart) set on January 3, 1931, against the Boston Bruins (matched by Deron Quint in 1995–96).

== Career statistics ==
			Regular season					Playoffs
Season	Team	League	GP	G	A	Pts	PIM	GP	G	A	Pts	PIM
1918–19	Toronto Beaches	OHA-Jr.	—	—	—	—	—	—	—	—	—	—
1919–20	Parkdale Canoe Club	OHA-Sr.	8	18	2	20	—	1	1	0	1	—
1920–21	Cleveland Indians	USAHA	10	23	0	23	—	8	6	0	6	—
1921–22	Cleveland Indians	USAHA	12	13	0	13	—	—	—	—	—	—
1922–23	Cleveland Indians	USAHA	20	22	0	22	—	—	—	—	—	—
1923–24	Cleveland Indians	USAHA	20	21	8	29	—	8	5	2	7	—
1924–25	Cleveland Blues	USAHA	40	21	0	21	—	8	6	3	9	24
1925–26	Montreal Maroons	NHL	36	34	8	42	119	4	0	2	2	10
1925–26	Montreal Maroons	St-Cup	—	—	—	—	—	4	6	1	7	16
1926–27	Montreal Maroons	NHL	43	17	4	21	133	2	0	0	0	4
1927–28	Montreal Maroons	NHL	41	27	7	34	104	9	2	2	4	13
1928–29	Montreal Maroons	NHL	44	21	8	29	74	—	—	—	—	—
1929–30	Montreal Maroons	NHL	44	39	15	55	81	4	1	1	2	2
1930–31	Montreal Maroons	NHL	42	25	14	39	75	2	1	0	1	6
1931–32	Montreal Maroons	NHL	38	22	11	33	61	4	0	1	1	2
1932–33	Boston Bruins	NHL	47	18	18	36	62	5	2	0	2	4
1933–34	Boston Bruins	NHL	48	22	17	39	68	—	—	—	—	—
1934–35	Boston Bruins	NHL	47	21	18	39	45	4	0	1	1	0
1935–36	New York Americans	NHL	48	14	15	29	16	5	1	2	3	4
1936–37	Boston Bruins	NHL	10	3	2	5	6	—	—	—	—	—
1936–37	New York Americans	NHL	33	20	10	30	31	—	—	—	—	—
1937–38	New York Americans	NHL	48	19	17	36	29	6	2	3	5	2
1938–39	New York Americans	NHL	46	16	19	35	43	2	0	0	0	0
1939–40	New York Americans	NHL	35	6	7	13	6	3	0	0	0	0
NHL totals			650	324	191	515	953	50	9	12	21	47

Sporting positions
Preceded by Dunc Munro	Montreal Maroons captain 1928–32	Succeeded by Hooley Smith
Preceded by Marty Barry	Boston Bruins captain 1934–35	Succeeded by Eddie Shore
Awards
Preceded by Billy Burch	Winner of the Hart Memorial Trophy; 1926	Succeeded by Herb Gardiner
Preceded by Roy Worters	Winner of the Hart Memorial Trophy; 1930	Succeeded by Howie Morenz
Preceded by Babe Dye	NHL Scoring Champion; 1926	Succeeded by Bill Cook
