= 1921 Memorial Cup =

Canadian junior ice hockey championship

The Memorial Cup trophy

The 1921 Memorial Cup final was the third junior ice hockey championship of the Canadian Amateur Hockey Association. The George Richardson Memorial Trophy champions Stratford Midgets of the Ontario Hockey Association in Eastern Canada competed against the Abbott Cup champions Winnipeg Junior Falcons of the Manitoba Junior Hockey League in Western Canada. In a two-game, total goal series, held at the Arena Gardens in Toronto, Ontario, Winnipeg won their first Memorial Cup, defeating Stratford 11 goals to 9.

== Background ==
The Winnipeg Falcons were formed out of the Young Men's Lutheran Club of the Icelandic Lutheran Church. They had defeated both the Regina Victorias and Fort William YMCA to become Western Canadian champions.

== Games ==
The first game was played on March 24, and was won 9–2 by Winnipeg. Game two was on March 26 and Stratford won 7–2. Winnipeg won the Memorial Cup based on their 11 goals to Stratford's 9, and were the first Western Canadian team to win the championship.

== Winning roster ==
Scotty Comfort, Wally Fridfinnson, Sammy McCallum, Harold McMunn, Herb McMunn, Bill McPherson, Harry Neil, Dave Patrick, Art Somers, Frank Woodall. Coach: Stan Bliss
