= Montreal Maroons =

Former professional men's ice hockey team in the National Hockey League (NHL)

- Founded: 1924
- History: Montreal Maroons; 1924–1938 (franchise cancelled in 1947)
- Home arena: Montreal Forum
- City: Montreal, Quebec
- Team colours: Maroon, white
- Stanley Cups: 2 (1925–26, 1934–35)
- Division championships: 2 (1929–30, 1935–36)

The Montreal Maroons (officially the Montreal Professional Hockey Club) were a professional ice hockey team in the National Hockey League (NHL). They played in the NHL from 1924 to 1938, winning the Stanley Cup in 1926 and 1935. They were the last non-Original Six team to win the Stanley Cup until the Philadelphia Flyers in 1974.

Founded as a team for the English community in Montreal, they shared their home city with the Canadiens, who eventually came under the same ownership as the Maroons but were intended to appeal to the French Canadian population. This was the first time since 1918, when the Montreal Wanderers folded, that Montreal had a second major-league professional hockey team. In order to accommodate the Maroons, a new arena was built for them in 1924, the Montreal Forum. The Maroons were a highly competitive team, winning the Stanley Cup twice and finishing first in their Canadian Division twice more. Some of the best players of the era played for the Maroons; eleven players were elected to the Hockey Hall of Fame, while five of the six head coaches of the Maroons were also honoured.

Financial difficulties resulting from the Great Depression led to the Maroons suspending play after 1938. Despite efforts to revive the team, the franchise was cancelled in 1947, leaving the Canadiens as the sole NHL team in Montreal. Since the Maroons' demise, no NHL team that has won a Stanley Cup at any point in its history has subsequently folded or relocated.

== History ==
=== Formation ===
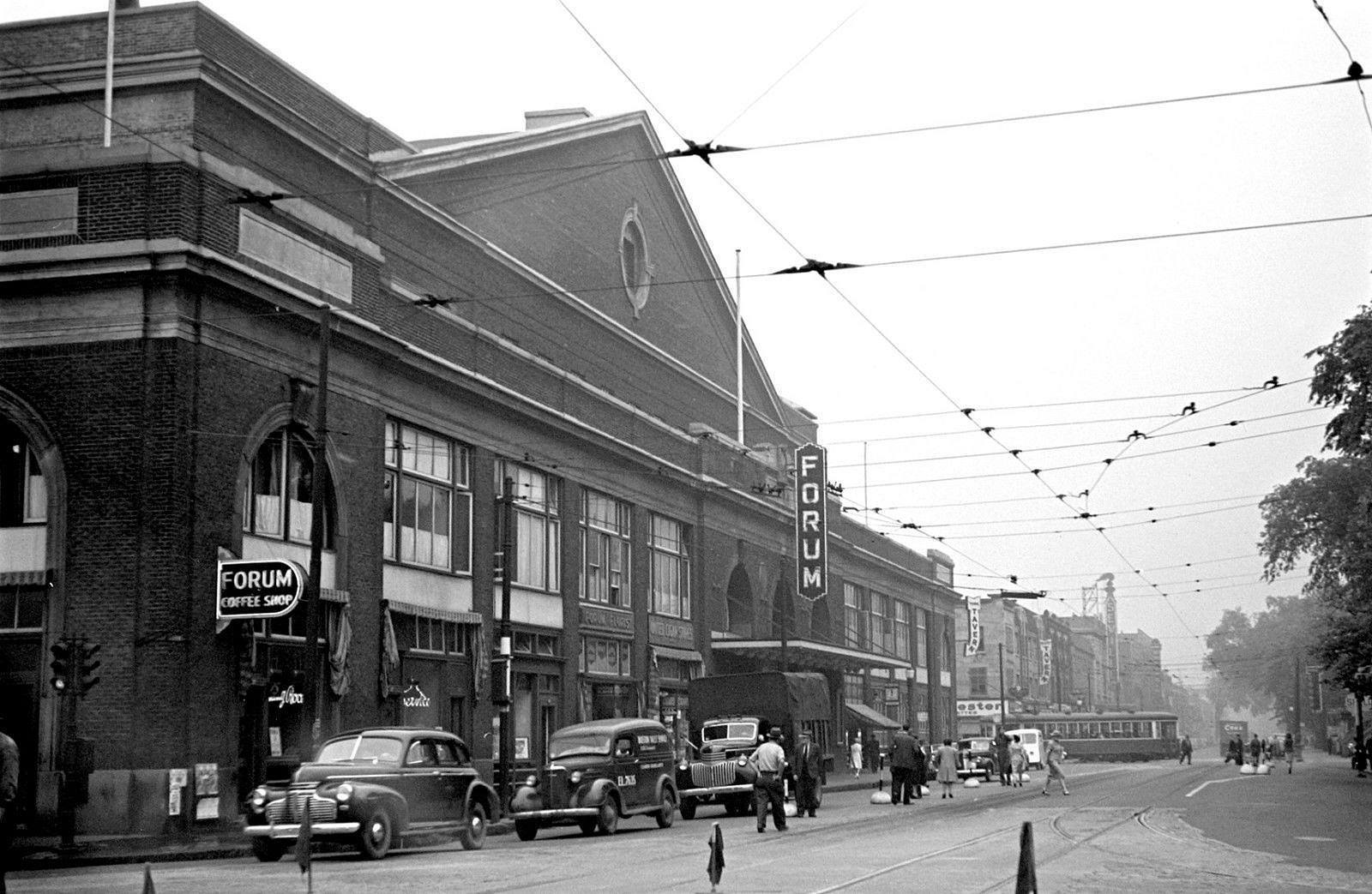
The Montreal Forum, built in 1924 as the home rink of both the Montreal Maroons and the Montreal Canadiens.

The Montreal Maroons ice hockey team was created to appeal to the anglophone neighbourhoods of Montreal. On January 2, 1918, the Montreal Arena, shared by the Montreal Canadiens and the Montreal Wanderers, burned down. The Canadiens, who drew primarily Montreal's francophones, moved to the Jubilee Arena which, in 1919, also burned down, before settling in the Mount Royal Arena, which had natural ice and seating for 3,250 spectators. The Wanderers, team of Montreal's anglophone community, folded. By 1922, work began to build a team to appeal to the anglophones and return to the NHL. In July 1924, construction began on a new arena, on the site of a former roller-skating rink known as the Forum. By fall, at a cost of CA$1,500,000 (equivalent to about $27,366,667 in 2025), the Montreal Forum was complete. The Montreal Forum was the first large arena in the NHL. The Maroons joined the NHL in 1924, along with the league's first United States-based team, the Boston Bruins. The Canadiens initially objected to a second team in Montreal, but relented when compensated by the expansion fee. The expansion fee for each team was CA$15,000 (equivalent to about $273,667 in 2025). The Canadiens, the local rivals of the Maroons, received $11,000 of the Maroons' fee. While the Canadiens' owner initially lodged a formal objection to ensure he would get adequate compensation for sharing his franchise's territory, he was actually quite enthusiastic about having a second franchise in the same city; rather, he would later state, he "saw in them an important and lucrative local rivalry."

Montreal Maroons dark logo

At the time of their founding, the Maroons had no nickname. The Maroons' president, James Strachan, had been the owner of the Wanderers in the 1900s. He attempted to secure the Wanderers name, but negotiations failed (Wanderers' last owner Sam Lichtenhein wanted CA$5,000 (equivalent to about $91,222 in 2025)), so the club was known by its official name, the Montreal Professional Hockey Club. With the team introducing maroon-coloured sweaters complete with a large capital letter "M" for a logo (the letter officially stood for their home city, not the colour), the "Maroons" nickname was picked up by the media. The club never officially changed the organizational name to incorporate the Maroons name.

=== Success at the gate and on the ice ===
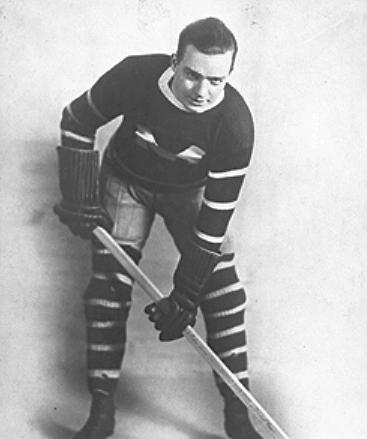
Centre Nels "Old Poison" Stewart

In the Maroons' first season, they finished second to last in the league. However, the new Forum was selling out and, with the addition of players like Nels Stewart, Babe Siebert and Merlyn Phillips, success came quickly. In a single year, the Maroons went from having their worst record in franchise history to their best. In only their second season, Montreal won their first Stanley Cup. The NHL playoffs that year were a two-game, total-goals format. Montreal won the opening series over the Pittsburgh Pirates 6–4, then upset the favored Ottawa Senators 2–1. In the NHL playoff final, Montreal defeated Ottawa to advance to the 1926 Stanley Cup Final against the Victoria Cougars of the Western Hockey League (WHL). In the last Stanley Cup Final involving two different leagues, Montreal defeated Victoria three games to one. Contributing to the victory was rookie, and future Hall of Fame member, Nels Stewart, who scored six of the Maroons' 10 goals in the series. Stewart won the Hart Trophy as most valuable player. While not a smooth skater, Stewart compensated with size (at 6 ft 1 in (1.85 m) and 195 lb (88 kg), he was a giant compared to other players of that era), toughness (amassing 119 penalty minutes), and shooting (scoring 34 of Montreal's 91 goals during the season). Stewart's 34 goals remained an NHL record for rookies until the 1970–71 season. During this era, team's best players often played the entire game with substitutions only made for injuries.

For the 1926–27 season, the NHL expanded to 10 teams and was divided into American and Canadian divisions. The Maroons finished third in the Canadian Division, behind their rivals the Canadiens, with whom they now shared the Forum. The two teams met in the playoffs for a two-game, total-goals series. The Forum was packed with 11,000 fans, in a building whose capacity was listed at 10,000, to watch the Canadiens defeat the defending Stanley Cup champions. The Maroons also participated in another moment of ice hockey history when, on November 16, 1926, they were the competition in the New York Rangers' NHL debut game, losing 1 to 0.

The Maroons got revenge on the Canadiens in the 1927–28 season, by eliminating them in the semifinals of the playoffs. The Maroons then met the New York Rangers for the 1928 Stanley Cup Final, but lost the series 3–2. Because the Ringling Bros. and Barnum & Bailey Circus occupied Madison Square Garden, all five games were played at the Forum.

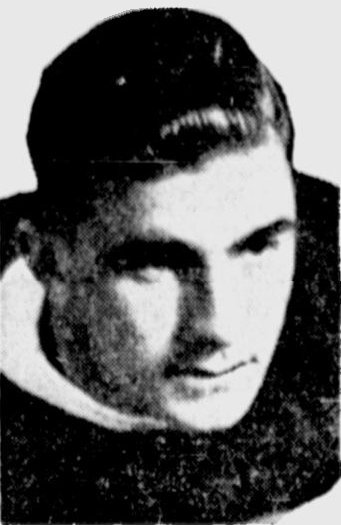
Hooley Smith, right winger on the "S Line"

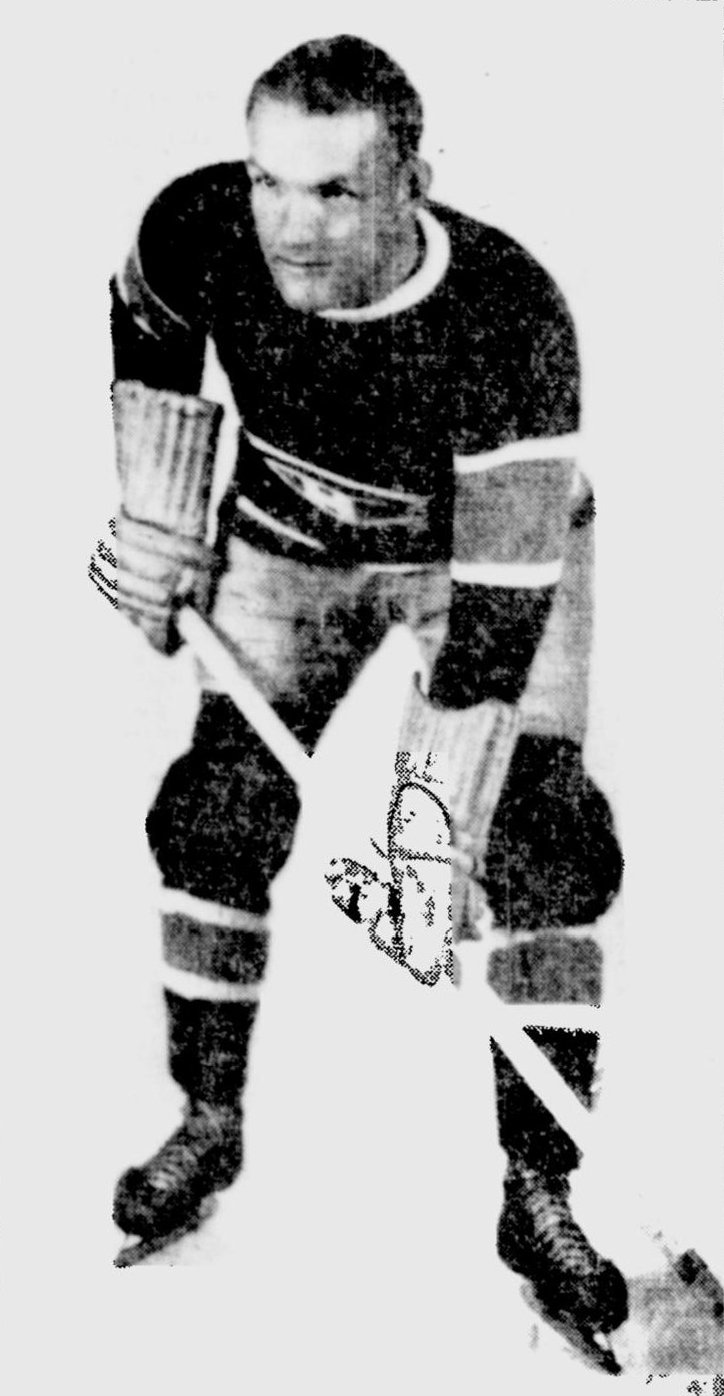
Babe Siebert, left winger on the feared "S Line"

The 1928–29 season was an oddly bad season for the Maroons, as they finished last in the Canadian Division. However, they rebounded the following season by finishing first. During these years, the Maroons were led by one of the most feared forward lines in the early NHL years, the "S Line", consisting of Hooley Smith, Babe Siebert and Nels Stewart, which was also one of the most penalized.

In the 1929–30 season, Dunc Munro was signed as player-coach of the team. It was during this season, that Clint Benedict of the Maroons became the first goaltender in NHL history to wear a mask when he donned one to protect a broken nose. Although the Maroons finished first in the Canadian Division, they were eliminated in the semifinals by the Boston Bruins.

For the 1930–31 season, Stewart again led his team in goals and points, but the Maroons only finished third in the Canadian Division, and were eliminated easily in the first round of the playoffs by the New York Rangers.

The Maroons made it into the playoffs of the 1931–32 season, by finishing five points ahead of the New York Americans. Montreal defeated the Detroit Falcons in the first round, but lost the semifinals against the Toronto Maple Leafs.

The Maroons finished the 1932–33 season in second place in the Canadian Division and even had three of the top six players in league points. However, Montreal was eliminated in the first round of the playoffs by the Detroit Red Wings.

In the playoffs of the 1933–34 season, the Chicago Black Hawks eliminated both Montreal teams, first defeating the Canadiens, then upsetting the Maroons in the semifinals.

In 1935, Leo Dandurand, owner of the Montreal Canadiens, sold the team to Canadian Arena Company (Ernest Savard, Louis Gelinas and Maurice Forget), which also owned the Montreal Maroons, for $165,000.

=== Great Depression and cessation of operations ===
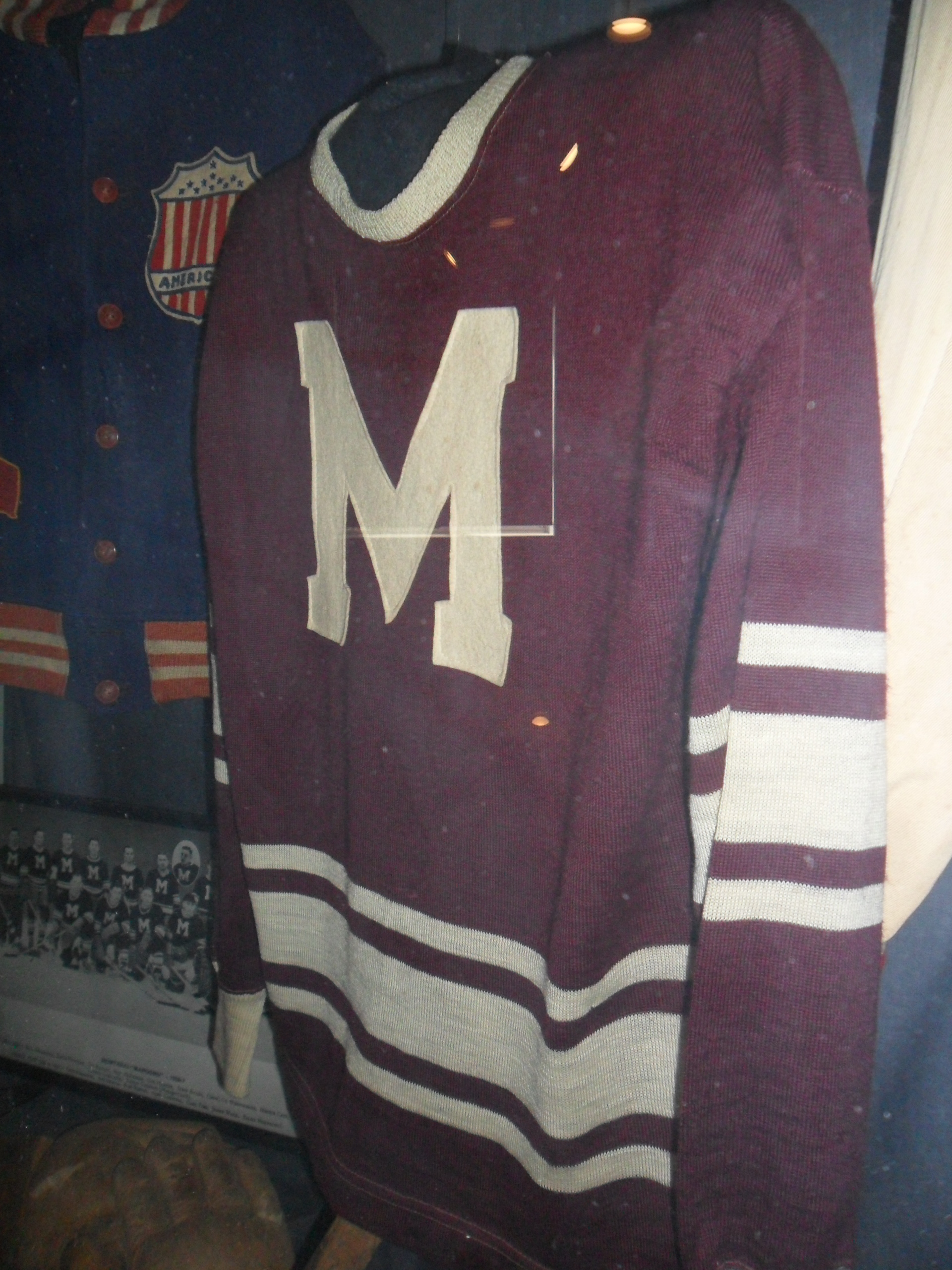
Maroons' jersey at International Hockey Hall of Fame

In Montreal, financial strains from the Great Depression hurt the attendances of both the Canadiens and Maroons. However, there were far more francophone supporters for the Canadiens than anglophone supporters for the Maroons. As a result, the Maroons finished with the worst attendance in the league, three seasons in a row. Also, by 1935, both teams were owned by Canadian Arena Company (Ernest Savard and Maurice Forget, who owned the Canadiens, were part of the Canadian Arena Company, as were Maroons owners James Strachan and Donat Raymond). It became obvious that only one team could represent Montreal. The Maroons' dire financial straits caused them to sell off several players, including star winger Hooley Smith. Despite the Maroons' financial troubles, they continued to play competitive ice hockey well into the 1930s.

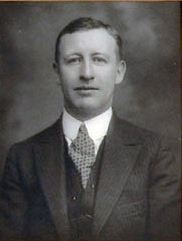
Tommy Gorman, coached Maroons to their second Stanley Cup. By coaching the Chicago Black Hawks to the Cup the previous year, Gorman is the only coach in history to win the Stanley Cup back-to-back with different teams.

For the 1934–35 season, the Maroons hired Tommy Gorman as coach, who had coached the Chicago Black Hawks to the 1934 Stanley Cup. The Maroons finished the season in second place behind Toronto. In the playoffs, the Maroons defeated Chicago with defensive ice hockey, defeated the New York Rangers at wide-open (offensive) ice hockey, and then defeated the Toronto Maple Leafs, who Gorman considered one of the best ice hockey teams of all time, in three straight games. The Maroons won their second Stanley Cup; Gorman remains the only coach in history to win back-to-back Cups with two different teams. The Maroons team were the last team to win the Stanley Cup without a loss in the playoffs for 17 years. Gorman called this Maroons team "the greatest team that ever stepped on the ice."

The playoffs of the 1935–36 season are famous for the longest NHL playoff game of all time. On March 24, 1936, the Maroons lost 1–0 to the Detroit Red Wings in 176:30 of play (16:30 of the sixth overtime period). The game was especially significant for Detroit goaltender Normie Smith, who began his career with the Maroons. He shut out the Maroons again in the second game, and allowed Detroit to complete a three-game sweep by allowing only one goal. Detroit proceeded to win the first Stanley Cup in their history.

In December 1936, Maroons captain Hooley Smith was traded to the Boston Bruins, a move which would mark the beginning of the end for the franchise. The 1936–37 season saw Nels Stewart break Howie Morenz's record for career goals with 271. Stewart would hold the all-time career record for goals until it was broken by Maurice Richard in 1952.

By the start of the 1937–38 season, rumours were rampant that the Maroons franchise would be moved to another city. In September 1937, Maroons president Donat Raymond said the team would be staying in Montreal. The team's bleak financial situation finally caught up with them as they finished 12–30–6, the club's worst season since winning only nine games in 1924–25. Lionel Conacher retired prior to the season to enter politics, winning a seat in the 1937 Ontario general election as a member of the Liberal Party. Tommy Gorman had tried to convince Conacher to stay with the Maroons and take over as coach; his retirement led Gorman to hire King Clancy. Clancy did not help improve the team's record, and on December 29, 1937, he was fired after 18 games and Gorman was re-instated as coach. The last game for the Maroons franchise, was a 6–3 loss on March 17, 1938, against the Canadiens. They finished the season with a record of 12 wins, 30 losses and 6 ties for 30 points in 48 games, placing the team last in the Canadian Division and last overall in the league.

At the annual league meeting on June 22, 1938, the Maroons formally asked the league to suspend the franchise for a year; this was refused, and the league asked the Maroons to confirm by August 1 if they were to participate in the upcoming season or not.

The league allowed the Maroons to suspend operations for the 1938–39 season. Lacking a formal dispersal draft, some of the Maroons were transferred to the Canadiens. Most of the Maroons players were either sold to the remaining NHL teams or washed out of the league altogether.

=== Attempted revival ===
The Maroons' owners tried to sell their dormant franchise to interests in St. Louis, but doubts regarding the previous failure of the St. Louis Eagles led to the league refusing permission. At the 1945 annual league meeting, held on September 7, it was noted that the backers of the Maroons franchise were in discussion to sell to a group from Philadelphia fronted by Canadiens board member Len Peto. The league governors were prepared to approve the transfer, provided the Philadelphia group could prove they had the necessary funds for a team. They also made sure to clarify that the Maroons franchise rights would expire in April 1947 unless something was done with them.

Peto was able to get the necessary funding, and persuaded the league to transfer the Maroons to Philadelphia. However, despite being larger than all but two NHL cities, Philadelphia did not have an arena that could accommodate an NHL team. The city's largest arena, the Palestra at the University of Pennsylvania, did not have an ice plant, and both Penn and Madison Square Garden, which managed the Palestra, balked at the expense of installing one. In any case, it would have only seated 9,000 for hockey. The city-owned Convention Hall was not equipped to produce ice either. The only arena in the city with an ice plant, Philadelphia Arena, was ruled out because its sight lines and capacity (5,500) were deemed inadequate even for temporary use. The league refused to extend its deadline to give Peto more time to find or build a suitable arena. In February 1946, Peto announced plans to build a 20,000-seat arena on the site of the old Baker Bowl at a cost of US$2,500,000 (equivalent to about $41,275,597 in 2025). However, when his group was unable to get funding for the project by the league-imposed deadline, the NHL cancelled the Maroons franchise.

The last active Maroons player in the NHL was Toe Blake, who last played in the 1947–48 season as a long time left wing for the Montreal Canadiens.

== Season-by-season record ==
The Maroons had a 271–260–91 regular season record, and a 17–20–9 playoff record with two Stanley Cup championships.

== Arenas ==
- Montreal Forum – built specifically for the Maroons; the Forum would become the most famous arena in ice hockey largely because of the Montreal Canadiens, who shared the arena with the Maroons from 1926 to 1938.

== Team personnel ==
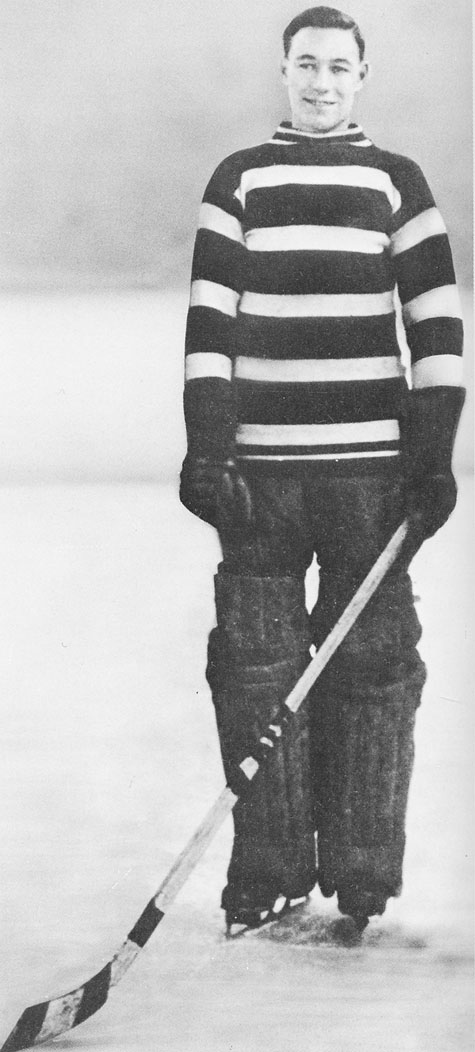
Hall of Famer Clint Benedict was the first NHL goaltender to wear a face mask in a game.

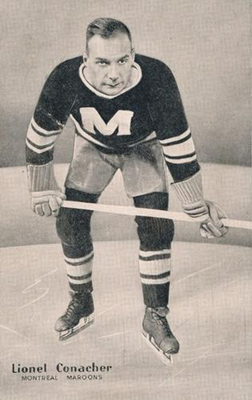
Lionel Conacher is one of three people to have their names engraved on both the Grey Cup and Stanley Cup; he won the latter with the Maroons in 1935.

=== Team captains ===
- Punch Broadbent 1924–1925
- Dunc Munro 1925–1928
- Nels Stewart 1928–1932
- Hooley Smith 1932–1936
- Lionel Conacher 1936–1937
- Stewart Evans 1937–1938

=== Hockey Hall of Famers ===
==== Players ====
- Clint Benedict
- Toe Blake
- Georges Boucher
- Punch Broadbent
- King Clancy (Note: Coach of the Maroons, elected to the Hockey Hall of Fame as a player)
- Sprague Cleghorn
- Lionel Conacher
- Alec Connell
- Red Dutton
- Eddie Gerard
- Reg Noble
- Babe Siebert
- Hooley Smith
- Nels Stewart

==== Builders ====
- Tommy Gorman
- William Northey
- Donat Raymond
- Carl Voss (Note: Player for the Maroons, elected to the Hockey Hall of Fame as a builder)

== Awards and trophies ==
Stanley Cup (Note: Between 1915 and 1926, it was an inter-league trophy. Since 1927, it is awarded for winning the NHL.)

- 1925–26, 1934–35

O'Brien Trophy (Note: Between 1922 and 1927, it was awarded to NHL playoff champion. In 1928–1938, it was awarded for winning NHL's Canadian Division in the regular season.)

- 1925–26, 1929–30, 1935–36

Prince of Wales Trophy (Note: In 1926 and 1927, it was awarded to NHL playoff champion. In 1928–1938, it was awarded for winning NHL's American Division in the regular season.)

- 1925–26

Calder Memorial Trophy

- Russ Blinco: 1933–34

Hart Memorial Trophy

- Nels Stewart: 1925–26, 1929–30

== See also ==
- List of defunct and relocated National Hockey League teams
- List of NHL seasons
- List of Montreal Maroons players
- List of Montreal Maroons head coaches
- List of Stanley Cup champions
