= Eric Carruthers =

British ice hockey player

- Born: 10 November 1895; Agincourt, Ontario, Canada
- Died: 19 November 1931 (aged 36); Petworth, West Sussex, England
- Relatives: Colin Carruthers (brother)
Ice hockey career
- Played for: British Olympic team (1924 and 1928)
- National team: United Kingdom
Medal record
Men's Ice hockey
Bronze medal – third place	1924 Chamonix	Team competition

Eric Dudley Carruthers (10 November 1895 – 19 November 1931) was a British ice hockey player who competed in the 1924 Winter Olympics and in the 1928 Winter Olympics.

He was born in Agincourt, Ontario, Canada and died in Petworth, England.

In 1924 he was a member of the British ice hockey team, which won the bronze medal.

Four years later he finished fourth with the British team in the 1928 Olympic tournament.

His older brother Colin was also a team member in both competitions.
