= Jack Cameron (ice hockey) =

Canadian ice hockey player

- Born: December 3, 1900 Ottawa, Ontario, Canada
- Died: November 29, 1981 (aged 80) Danville, Virginia, U.S.
- Height: 5 ft 4 in (163 cm)
- Weight: 130 lb (59 kg; 9 st 4 lb)
- Position: Goaltender
- Caught: Left
- Played for: Toronto Granites
- National team: Canada
- Playing career: 1922–1930
Medal record
Olympic Games
Gold medal – first place	1924 Chamonix	Team

John Archibald Cameron (December 3, 1900 – November 29, 1981) was a Canadian ice hockey goaltender who competed in the 1924 Winter Olympics.

== Career ==
Cameron was a member of the Toronto Granites team that won a gold medal for Canada in ice hockey at the 1924 Winter Olympics.

In recognition of Cameron's role in international hockey for Canada in 1924, 50 years later, he participated in the post-game award ceremony following game #1 of the 1974 Summit Series in Quebec City. He presented the game's MVP awards to Bobby Hull (Canada) and Valeri Kharlamov (Soviet Union).

== Career statistics ==
=== International ===
Year	Team	Event	GP	W	L	T	MIN	GA	SO	GAA
1924	Canada men's national ice hockey team	1924 Winter Olympics	3	3	0	0	180	1	2	0.33
