= Cyril Slater =

Canadian ice hockey player

- Born: March 24, 1896 Montreal, Quebec, Canada
- Died: October 26, 1969 (aged 73) Montreal, Quebec, Canada
- Height: 5 ft 8 in (173 cm)
- Weight: 145 lb (66 kg; 10 st 5 lb)
- Position: Defence
- Shot: Left
- National team: Canada
- Playing career: 1915–1933
Medal record
Olympic Games
Gold medal – first place	1924 Chamonix	Team

Cyril Seely "Sig" Slater (March 24, 1896 – October 26, 1969) was a Canadian ice hockey player who competed in the 1924 Winter Olympics. He was born in Montreal.

Slater was a member of the Toronto Granites team that won a gold medal for Canada in ice hockey at the 1924 Winter Olympics.
