= Hooley Smith =

Canadian ice hockey player (1903–1963)

- Hockey Hall of Fame, 1972
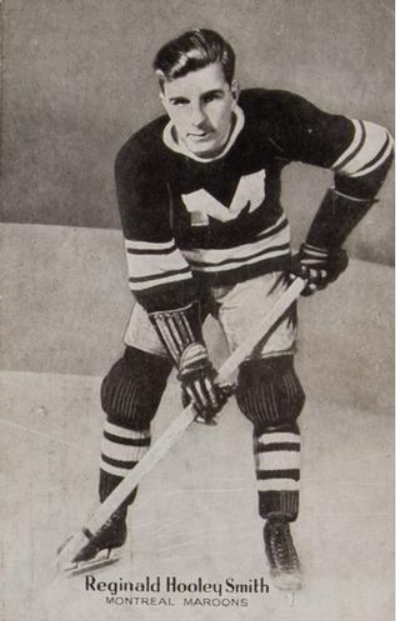
- Smith in 1935 postcard
- Born: January 7, 1903 Toronto, Ontario, Canada
- Died: August 24, 1963 (aged 60) Montreal, Quebec, Canada
- Height: 5 ft 10 in (178 cm)
- Weight: 155 lb (70 kg; 11 st 1 lb)
- Position: Centre/Right Wing
- Shot: Right
- Played for: Toronto Granites; Ottawa Senators; Montreal Maroons; Boston Bruins; New York Americans
- National team: Canada
- Playing career: 1921–1941
Medal record
Men's ice hockey
Representing Canada
Olympic Games
| Gold medal – first place | 1924 Chamonix | Team competition |

Reginald Joseph "Hooley" Smith (January 7, 1903 – August 24, 1963) was a Canadian professional ice hockey forward who played for the Ottawa Senators, Montreal Maroons, Boston Bruins and New York Americans between 1924 and 1941. He won the Stanley Cup twice, with Ottawa and Montreal. Prior to turning professional he played at the 1924 Winter Olympics, winning a gold medal with the Canada national team.

== Playing career ==
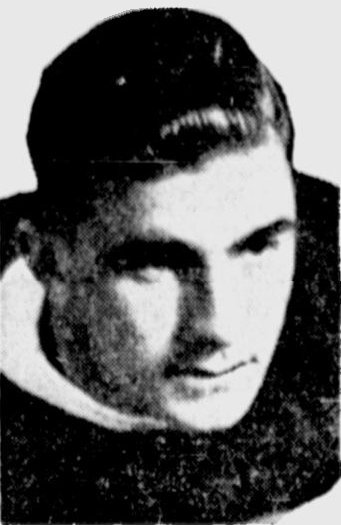
Smith in early photo

Born in Toronto, Ontario, Smith played amateur hockey for the Toronto Granites team that won the Allan Cup and a gold medal for Canada at the 1924 Winter Olympics. He had an outstanding Olympic ice hockey tournament, scoring 17 goals and 33 points in five games.

He started his professional career with the 'Super Six' of the Ottawa Senators the following winter. In his first season with Ottawa, he received a head injury. When he returned to play he wore a jockey-type helmet to protect his head. In 1926–27, Ottawa won the Stanley Cup against Boston. It was the last game that Smith played with Ottawa. After attacking Harry Oliver in the final game of that series, he was suspended for a month of the following year. Ottawa had lost money during the season despite winning the Stanley Cup and the team sold Smith to the Montreal Maroons.

As a member of the Maroons, Hooley would be a part of one of the best early forward lines in NHL history, the "S line". He, Nels Stewart and Albert "Babe" Siebert made up the famous line that was feared throughout the NHL. Smith was named captain of the Maroons and was their captain when the team won its final Stanley Cup in 1935.

By the mid-1930s the Maroons were experiencing financial difficulties and he was sold to Boston, where he only played for one season. He then was sold to the New York Americans. Starting with 1938–39, he played defence for the Americans until 1941 after which he retired. From the 1940 season, he held the NHL mark for career games played, which he held until 1944, when surpassed by Dit Clapper.

== Later life ==
Hooley Smith died as a result of a heart attack on August 24, 1963, at St. Mary's Hospital in Montreal. At the time of his death, he was the last surviving member of the famed "S" line. He was inducted into the Hockey Hall of Fame in 1972.

== Career statistics ==
=== Regular season and playoffs ===
| | | | Regular season | | | | | Playoffs |
| Season | Team | League | GP | G | A | Pts | PIM | GP | G | A | Pts | PIM |
|---|---|---|---|---|---|---|---|---|---|---|---|---|
| 1919–20 | Toronto Beaches | OHA | — | — | — | — | — | — | — | — | — | — |
| 1920–21 | Parkdale Canoe Club | OHA | 3 | 3 | 0 | 3 | — | — | — | — | — | — |
| 1921–22 | Toronto Granites | OHA | 5 | 1 | 0 | 1 | — | 1 | 0 | 0 | 0 | — |
| 1922–23 | Toronto Granites | OHA Sr | 8 | 3 | 3 | 6 | — | 2 | 1 | 0 | 1 | 2 |
| 1922–23 | Toronto Granites | Al-Cup | — | — | — | — | — | 6 | 1 | 6 | 7 | 12 |
| 1923–24 | Toronto Granites | Exhib | 15 | 10 | 14 | 24 | — | — | — | — | — | — |
| 1924–25 | Ottawa Senators | NHL | 10 | 13 | 23 | 81 | — | — | — | — | — |
| 1925–26 | Ottawa Senators | NHL | 28 | 16 | 9 | 25 | 53 | 2 | 0 | 0 | 0 | 14 |
| 1926–27 | Ottawa Senators | NHL | 43 | 9 | 6 | 15 | 125 | 6 | 1 | 0 | 1 | 16 |
| 1927–28 | Montreal Maroons | NHL | 34 | 14 | 5 | 19 | 72 | 9 | 2 | 1 | 3 | 23 |
| 1928–29 | Montreal Maroons | NHL | 41 | 10 | 9 | 19 | 120 | — | — | — | — | — |
| 1929–30 | Montreal Maroons | NHL | 42 | 21 | 9 | 30 | 83 | 4 | 1 | 1 | 2 | 14 |
| 1930–31 | Montreal Maroons | NHL | 39 | 12 | 14 | 26 | 68 | — | — | — | — | — |
| 1931–32 | Montreal Maroons | NHL | 43 | 11 | 33 | 44 | 49 | 4 | 2 | 1 | 3 | 2 |
| 1932–33 | Montreal Maroons | NHL | 48 | 20 | 21 | 41 | 66 | 2 | 2 | 0 | 2 | 2 |
| 1933–34 | Montreal Maroons | NHL | 47 | 18 | 19 | 37 | 58 | 4 | 0 | 1 | 1 | 6 |
| 1934–35 | Montreal Maroons | NHL | 46 | 5 | 22 | 27 | 41 | 6 | 0 | 0 | 0 | 14 |
| 1935–36 | Montreal Maroons | NHL | 47 | 19 | 19 | 38 | 75 | 3 | 0 | 0 | 0 | 2 |
| 1936–37 | Boston Bruins | NHL | 44 | 8 | 10 | 18 | 36 | 3 | 0 | 0 | 0 | 0 |
| 1937–38 | New York Americans | NHL | 47 | 10 | 10 | 20 | 23 | 6 | 0 | 3 | 3 | 0 |
| 1938–39 | New York Americans | NHL | 48 | 8 | 11 | 19 | 18 | 2 | 0 | 0 | 0 | 14 |
| 1939–40 | New York Americans | NHL | 47 | 7 | 8 | 15 | 41 | 3 | 3 | 1 | 4 | 2 |
| 1940–41 | New York Americans | NHL | 41 | 2 | 7 | 9 | 4 | — | — | — | — | — |
| NHL totals | | | 715 | 200 | 225 | 445 | 1,013 | 54 | 11 | 8 | 19 | 109 |

=== International ===
| Year | Team | Event | GP | G | A | Pts | PIM |
|---|---|---|---|---|---|---|---|
| 1924 | Canada | OLY | 5 | 17 | 16 | 33 | 4 |
| Senior totals | | | 5 | 1 | 3 | 4 | 4 |

== Transactions ==
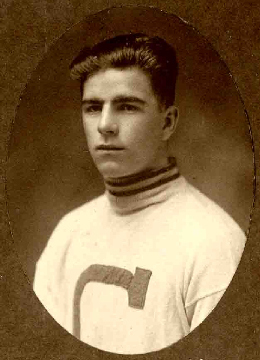
Smith with the Toronto Granites in the 1921–22 season.

- October 31, 1924 – Signed as a free agent by Ottawa Senators.
- October 7, 1927 – Traded to Montreal Maroons by Ottawa for Harry Broadbent and $22,500.
- October 26, 1936 – Traded to Boston by Mtl. Maroons for cash and future considerations (Gerry Shannon, December 4, 1936).
- November 5, 1937 – Traded to New York Americans by Boston for cash.

Source: Legends of Hockey

| Preceded by Nels Stewart | Montreal Maroons captain 1932–36 | Succeeded by Lionel Conacher |
