= Harold McMunn =

Canadian ice hockey player (1902–1964)

- Born: October 6, 1902 Lanark, Ontario, Canada
- Died: February 5, 1964 (aged 61) Winnipeg, Manitoba, Canada
- Position: Right wing
- Played for: Winnipeg Maroons
- National team: Canada
- Playing career: 1921–1927
Medal record
Olympic Games
Gold medal – first place	1924 Chamonix	Team

Harold Edgar McMunn (October 6, 1902 – February 5, 1964) was a Canadian ice hockey player who competed in the 1924 Winter Olympics. He was born in Lanark, Ontario, but grew up in Winnipeg, Manitoba.

McMunn was a member of the Toronto Granites team that won a gold medal for Canada in ice hockey at the 1924 Winter Olympics.

As a junior ice hockey player, McMunn won the 1921 Memorial Cup as a member of the Winnipeg Junior Falcons.
