= Ernie Collett (ice hockey) =

Canadian ice hockey player (1895–1951)

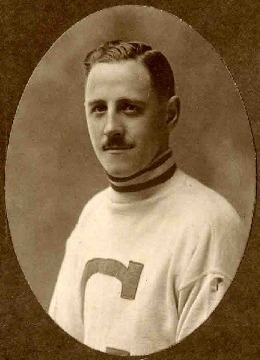
- Collett with the Toronto Granites
- Born: March 3, 1895 York County, Ontario, Canada
- Died: December 21, 1951 (aged 56) Toronto, Ontario, Canada
- Weight: 170 lb (77 kg; 12 st 2 lb)
- Position: Goaltender
- Caught: Left
- Played for: Toronto Granites
- National team: Canada
- Playing career: 1915–1926
Medal record
Men's ice hockey Competitor for Canada
Gold medal – first place	1924 Chamonix	Team

Ernest John Collett (March 3, 1895 – December 21, 1951) was a Canadian ice hockey player who competed in the 1924 Winter Olympics.

== Early life ==
Collett was born in York County, Ontario. Before joining the Toronto Granites, he played in the amateur leagues for the Toronto Riverside Hockey Club, Toronto Crescents, Toronto Newman Hall, and Toronto Parkdale.

== Career ==
Collett was a member of the Toronto Granites team, which won a gold medal for Canada in ice hockey at the 1924 Winter Olympics. He was also Canada's first ever flag bearer at opening ceremonies of the Winter Olympics.
