= Toronto Granites =

Defunct Canadian ice hockey team

- Sport: Ice hockey
- Founded: 1880s
- Folded: 1924
- League: OHA (1890-1924)
- Location: Toronto, Ontario, Canada
- Affiliation: Toronto Granite Curling Club
- Championships: 2
- League titles: 3

The Toronto Granites were an amateur senior ice hockey team from Toronto, Ontario. The Granites were Allan Cup champions in 1922 and 1923. They were chosen to represent Canada at the 1924 Winter Olympics in Chamonix, France. The Granites won the second consecutive Olympic gold medal for the Canada national men's ice hockey team.

== History ==
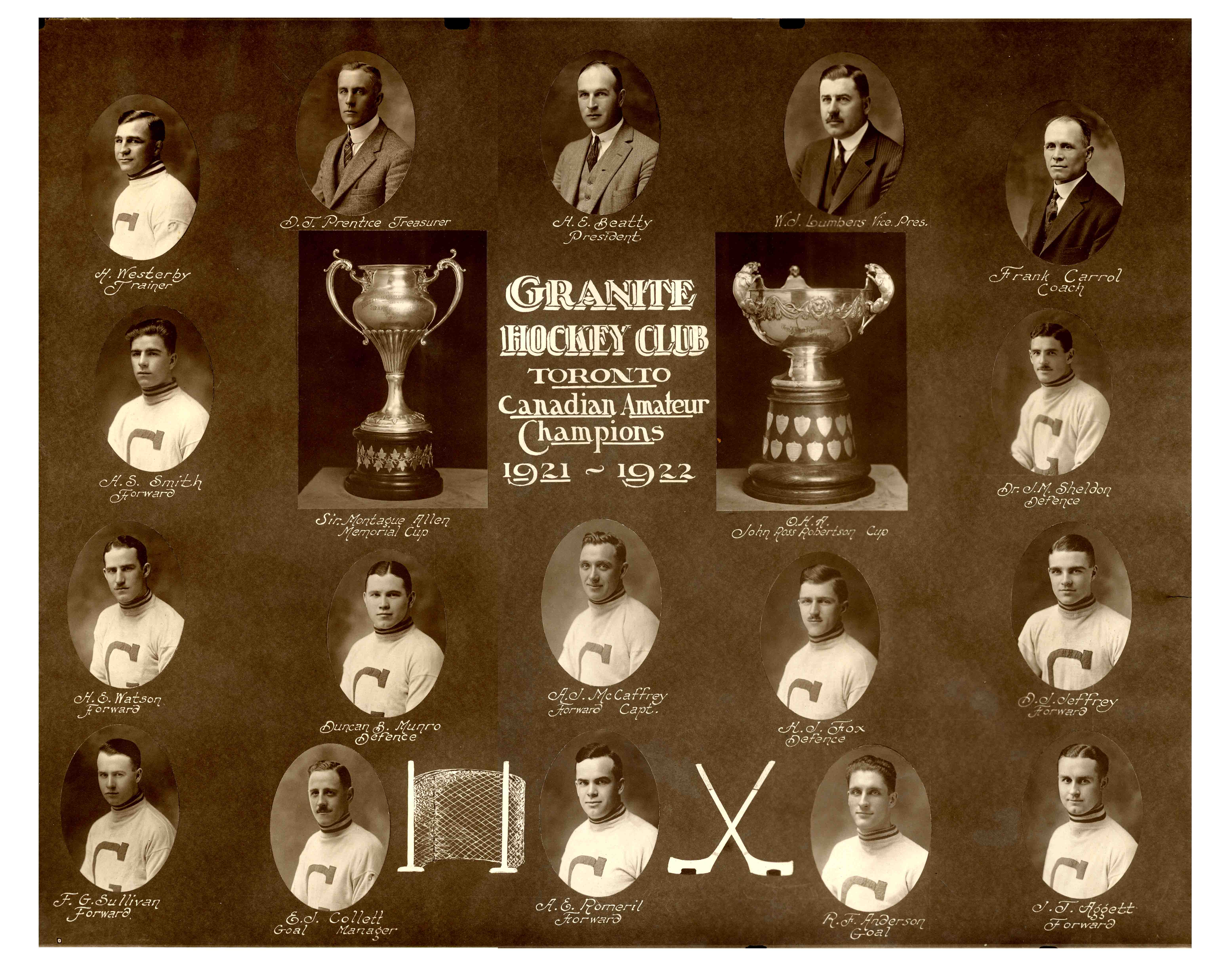
1921–22 Toronto Granites. Top row, left to right: H. Westerby, D.T. Prentice, H.E. Beatty, W.J. Lumbers, F. Carroll. Second row: H.S. Smith, Dr. J.M. Sheldon. Third row: H.E. Watson, D.B. Munro, A.J. McCaffrey, H.J. Fox, D.J. Jeffrey. Bottom row: F.G. Sullivan, E.J. Collett, A.E. Romeril, R.F. Anderson, J.T. Aggett.

Formed in the 1880s, the Granites were the first organized ice hockey team in Toronto. The ice hockey team was an offshoot of the Toronto Granite Curling Club, which still exists today as The Granite Club. At first, games were only exhibitions, such as visits from teams in Ottawa or Montreal, or local competition from the Caledonian Rink or other curling clubs which formed ice hockey teams, with no championships or tournaments. The team joined the Ontario Hockey Association (OHA) for the 1890–91 season. The team would play in the OHA until 1924, adding a junior club in 1893, which continued until 1923. The Granites won the J. Ross Robertson Cup in 1920, 1922 and 1923, as the senior champion of the OHA. The club was the Canadian champion, winning the 1922 Allan Cup and 1923 Allan Cup, becoming Canadian champions.

== 1924 Winter Olympics ==
Ontario Hockey Association president W. A. Fry recommended to have the Toronto Granites, being the 1923 Allan Cup champions, represent Canada in ice hockey at the 1924 Winter Olympics. The Canadian Amateur Hockey Association approved the Granites to represent Canada, and W. A. Hewitt was chosen oversee the team's finances at the Olympics. Hewitt was also empowered by the CAHA to name replacement players as needed, and recruited Harold McMunn and Cyril Slater as replacements when four players from the Granites were unable to travel to the Olympics.

In his weekly report to the Toronto Daily Star, Hewitt wrote that the Granites would face multiple changes in conditions compared to hockey games in Canada. He did not feel the team would be affected by playing outdoors on natural ice in the morning or afternoon, despite that the team was accustomed to playing indoors with electric lighting on artificial ice. He also felt that the larger ice surface and lack of boards around the sides of the rink would mean more stick handling and less physical play. The Granites defeated the United States team by a 6–1 score, and won all six games played to be the Olympic gold medallists.

Team roster

- Frank Rankin (coach), Jack Cameron, Ernest Collett, Albert McCaffrey, Harold McMunn, Duncan Munro, Beattie Ramsay, Cyril Slater, Reginald Smith, Harry Watson

Preceded by Winnipeg Falcons	Canada men's Olympic ice hockey team 1924	Succeeded by University of Toronto Grads
