= Harry Watson (ice hockey, born 1898) =

Canadian ice hockey player (1898–1957)

- Hockey Hall of Fame, 1963
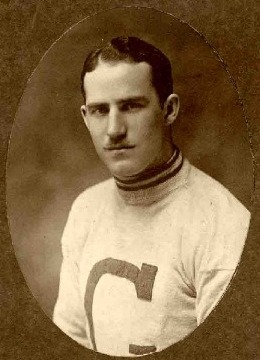
- Watson with the Toronto Granites
- Born: July 14, 1898 Harbour Grace, Newfoundland Colony
- Died: September 11, 1957 (aged 59) London, Ontario, Canada
- Weight: 165 lb (75 kg; 11 st 11 lb)
- Position: Left wing / Centre
- Shot: Left
- Played for: Toronto Nationals; Toronto Marlboros; Toronto Parkdale Canoe Club; Toronto Granites; Toronto Dentals; Toronto Aura Lee
- National team: Canada
- Playing career: 1916–1932
Medal record
Men's ice hockey
Representing Canada
Olympic Games
Gold medal – first place	1924 Chamonix	Team competition

Henry Ellis Watson (July 14, 1898 — September 11, 1957) was a Canadian amateur ice hockey player. He was a member of the Toronto Granites team that won a gold medal for Canada in ice hockey at the 1924 Winter Olympics. He was posthumously inducted into the Hockey Hall of Fame in 1962, and into the IIHF Hall of Fame in 1998.

== Early years ==
Born Henry Ellis Watson in Harbour Grace, he lived in Winnipeg, Manitoba before moving to Toronto at age 16. Watson was educated in Winnipeg and at St. Andrews College from January 1915 to June 1916. He played on the college hockey and football teams, and was a first-team all-star in 1915. He also played ice hockey for the Toronto Aura Lee from 1915 to 1917, before enlisting in the Royal Flying Corps in Toronto in March 1917.

== Royal Flying Corps ==
Watson sailed for England in July 1917, and following flying training, was posted to No. 41 Squadron RAF in November. He served with the unit until July 1918, in that time claiming six victories and becoming a flying ace. He flew a Royal Aircraft Factory SE.5 to victory over an Albatros D.V on January 25, 1918, with fellow Canadian Frank Harold Taylor. By his sixth and final victory on July 4, he had destroyed another enemy plane and sent four more down. He returned to Canada in January 1919.

== Playing career ==
After the war, Watson joined the Toronto Dentals in a playoff series won by the Hamilton Tigers. For the 1919–20 season, he joined the Toronto Granite Club team in the Ontario Hockey Association senior league. Led by Watson, the Granites won the Allan Cup in 1921–22 and 1922–23, with him named a first-team all-star in both seasons. The team represented Canada in ice hockey at the 1924 Winter Olympics, winning the gold medal while Watson scored 36 goals. The Canadian team outscored the opposition 132–3. In one game against Switzerland, Watson scored 13 goals.

Watson was nicknamed "Moose". He turned down offers to play professionally in the National Hockey League (NHL). Charlie Querrie, manager of the Toronto St. Patricks, offered Watson $10,000 to join his team for the 1924–25 season, but Watson declined. Watson retired as a player in 1924 to work in the insurance business.

== Coaching career ==
In 1930, he became coach of the Toronto National Sea Fleas senior amateur team. During the 1931 playoff season, Watson refereed several OHA games. In December 1931, during his second season behind the bench for the Sea Fleas, Watson made a brief comeback as a player at the age of 33 after one of his players was unable to make a road trip. As coach, Watson guided the team to the Allan Cup in 1932.

== Death and Honours ==
Watson died in London, Ontario, on 11 September 1957, following an operation for a brain tumour, and was interred at Mount Pleasant Cemetery, Toronto. He was posthumously inducted into the Hockey Hall of Fame in 1962, and into the IIHF Hall of Fame in 1998.

== Sources ==
- MacLeod, Alan Livingstone (2018). From Rinks to Regiments: Hockey Hall-of-Famers and the Great War. Victoria, British Columbia: Heritage House. ISBN 978-1-77203-268-0.
