= 1922 Allan Cup =

Canadian senior ice hockey championship

The Allan Cup was the championship trophy for amateur senior ice hockey overseen by the CAHA.

The 1922 Allan Cup was the senior ice hockey championship of the Canadian Amateur Hockey Association (CAHA) for the 1921–22 season.

CAHA president W. R. Granger oversaw the final series between the Toronto Granites and the Regina Victorias hosted in Toronto. Despite that it had been a recurring practice for each team to choose one of the two on-ice officials for the series, Granger scheduled two referees from Montreal when the Granites protested the referee chosen from Western Canada. Western Canada cup trustee Claude C. Robinson then protested that two eastern referees were appointed to the series. Discussion ensued at the CAHA annual meeting being hosted in Toronto at the same time as the series, and a vote of the branch presidents confirmed that the practice of one referee each from Eastern and Western Canada should be used. The CAHA also decided that Eastern and Western Canada should take turns hosting the final series for the Allan Cup. The CAHA also approved that the reigning Allan Cup champions could challenge for the Hamilton B. Wills Trophy as an international series with the amateur champions of the United States Amateur Hockey Association.

== Final ==
Two games total goals

- Toronto 6 Regina 2
- Toronto 7 Regina 0

Toronto Granites beat Regina Victorias 13 goals to 2.
