= William S. Haddock =

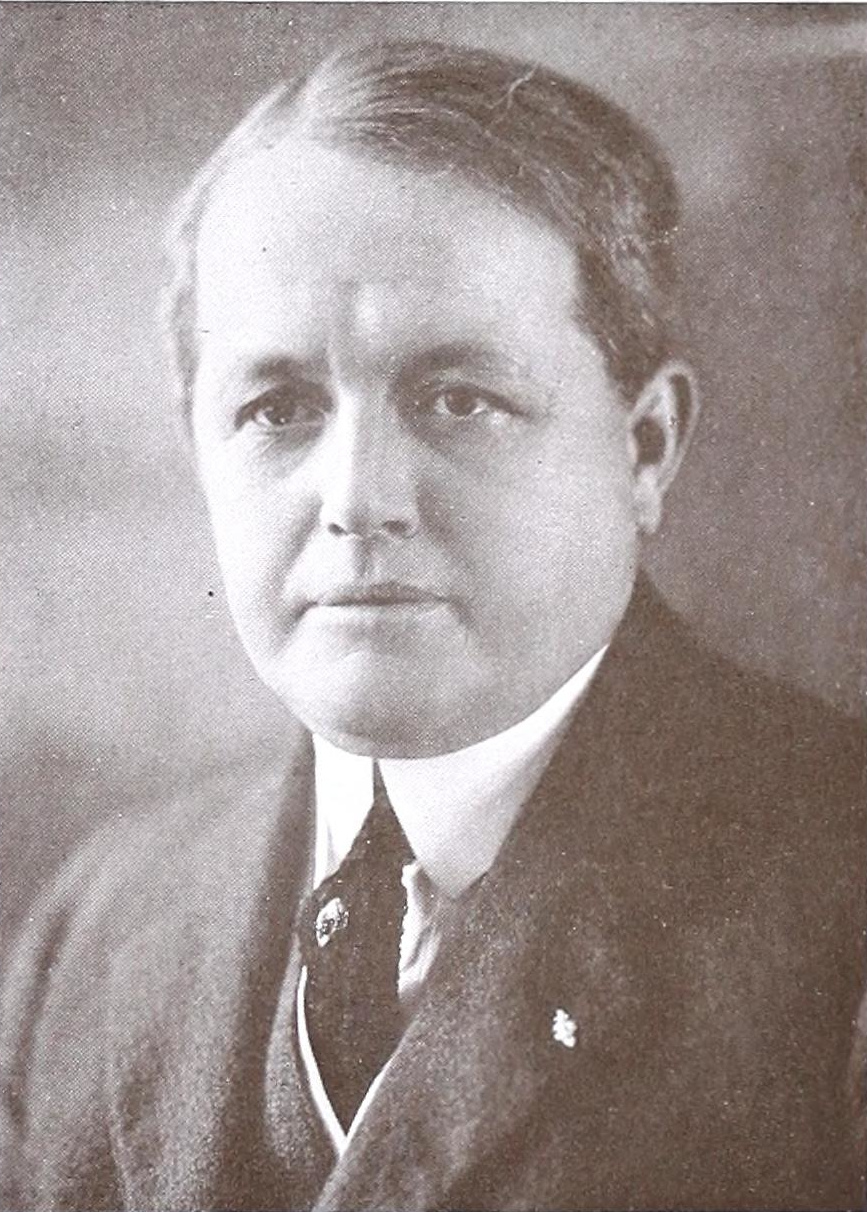
- Born: William Samuel Haddock; July 28, 1875; Swansea, Wales
- Died: October 13, 1953 (aged 78); Pittsburgh, Pennsylvania, U.S.
- Spouse: Wilhelmina Kreis (m. 1906)
- Children: 5

William Samuel Haddock (July 28, 1875 – October 13, 1953) was an American politician and athletic leader who served as president of the United States Amateur Hockey Association from its creation in 1920 until its demise in 1930.

== Early life ==
Haddock was born in Swansea. His father, William Haddock was a Baptist minister and their family emigrated from Wales when Haddock was ten years old. The family first resided in Frostburg, Maryland, but moved to Pittsburgh following his father's death a few years later. Once in Pittsburgh, Haddock began working for The Pittsburgh Press as a copy boy and rose to the position of circulation manager. He served in the 10th Pennsylvania Volunteer Infantry Regiment during the Spanish–American War and the Philippine–American War.

== Politics ==
Haddock was elected Sheriff of Allegheny County in 1917. In 1919, he conducted an investigation into the death of Fannie Sellins, who was shot and killed during a miner's strike in Natrona, Pennsylvania. A coroner's examination did not find a gunshot wound, but one was found after the body was exhumed and reexamined by two physicians. Haddock contended that the wound was "deliberately inflicted, after the official autopsy...to discredit those in authority and for the further purpose of furnishing anarchistic, dangers and revolutionary agitators and organizers propaganda". After Haddock left office, two of his deputies were acquitted of her murder. In 1921, he sought the office of coroner, as state law prevented him from seeking reelection. He lost the Republican primary to W. G. McGregor by 20,000 votes.

In 1926, Haddock was appointed Burgess of Dormont, Pennsylvania to fill the unexpired term William E. Best. He ran for a full term in 1929 on the Democratic and Fair Play tickets, but lost to Republican Charles Chamberlain.

== Athletics ==
In 1893, Haddock organized Pittsburgh's first basketball team at the Central YMCA. In 1897, he organized the All-Pittsburg baseball team. He helped found the Allegheny Mountain Association of the Amateur Athletic Union in 1917 and served as its president from its founding until his death. In 1935, Haddock was a leading figure in the creation of the American Amateur Baseball Congress.

=== Hockey ===
Haddock served as vice chairman of the International Skating Union of America and was treasurer of the United States Olympic Fund. In 1920, he was elected the first president of the United States Amateur Hockey Association, which was formed to replace the ISU as the governing body for ice hockey in the United States. He was the also manager of the United States men's national ice hockey team at the 1924 Winter Olympics. The USAHA selected the Augsburg College hockey team to represent the United States at the 1928 Winter Olympics, however the American Olympic Committee, led by Douglas MacArthur, refused to certify the Augsburg team due to the lack of Olympic trials. Haddock insisted that the Augsburg team was the only one in the country that had the ability and the funds to compete in the Olympics and refused to approve any other team. As a result, the United States did not have an Olympic hockey team in 1928. In 1930, the USAHA was dissolved and the Amateur Athletic Union took control of ice hockey.

=== Soccer ===
Haddock served as secretary of The Pittsburgh Press' soccer league and was treasurer of the United States Football Association. He was chairman of the United States soccer Olympic committee for the 1924 Summer Olympics.

== Personal life ==
Haddock had four daughters and one son with his wife, Wilhelmina Kreis. He died on October 13, 1953 at the Aspinwall Veterans Hospital in Pittsburgh.
