= 1923 Allan Cup =

Canadian senior ice hockey championship

The Allan Cup trophy

The 1923 Allan Cup was the Canadian senior ice hockey championship for the 1922–23 season.

== Final ==
2 games total goals

- Toronto 6 University of Saskatchewan 1
- Toronto 5 University of Saskatchewan 1

Toronto Granites beat University of Saskatchewan 11 goals to 2.
