= 1927–28 New York Americans season =

National Hockey League team season

1927–28 New York Americans
- Division: 5th Canadian
- 1927–28 record: 11–27–6
- Home record: 6–13–3
- Road record: 5–14–3
- Goals for: 63
- Goals against: 128

Team information
- General manager: Tommy Gorman
- Coach: Shorty Green
- Captain: Billy Burch
- Arena: Madison Square Garden

Team leaders
- Goals: Norman Himes (14)
- Assists: Lionel Conacher (6)
- Points: Norman Himes (19)
- Penalty minutes: Clarence Boucher (129)
- Wins: Joe Miller (8)
- Goals against average: Joe Miller (2.68)

The 1927–28 New York Americans season was the American's third season of play. The team finished in last place in the Canadian Division and did not qualify for the playoffs.

== Regular season ==
=== Final standings ===
Canadian Division
	GP	W	L	T	GF	GA	PIM	Pts
**Montreal Canadiens**	44	26	11	7	116	48	496	59
**Montreal Maroons**	44	24	14	6	96	77	549	54
**Ottawa Senators**	44	20	14	10	78	57	483	50
Toronto Maple Leafs	44	18	18	8	89	88	436	44
New York Americans	44	11	27	6	63	128	563	28

Note: W = Wins, L = Losses, T = Ties, GF = Goals For, GA = Goals Against, Pts = Points
Teams that qualified for the playoffs are highlighted in bold.

=== Record vs. opponents ===
==== Vs. Canadian Division ====
1927–28 NHL records
Team	**MTL**	**MTM**	**NYA**	**OTT**	**TOR**	**Total**
M. Canadiens	—	2–2–2	4–2	3–2–1	3–2–1	**12–8–4**
M. Maroons	2–2–2	—	4–1–1	3–2–1	5–0–1	**14–5–5**
N.Y. Americans	2–4	1–4–1	—	1–5	1–4–1	**5–17–2**
Ottawa	2–3–1	2–3–1	5–1	—	1–1–4	**10–8–6**
Toronto	2–3–1	0–5–1	4–1–1	1–1–4	—	**7–10–7**

==== Vs. American Division ====
1927–28 NHL records
Team	**BOS**	**CHI**	**DET**	**NYR**	**PIT**	**Total**
M. Canadiens	2–0–2	4–0	2–2	4–0	2–1–1	**14–3–3**
M. Maroons	2–2	3–1	1–3	2–1–1	2–2	**10–9–1**
N.Y. Americans	1–3	3–1	0–2–2	0–3–1	2–1–1	**6–10–4**
Ottawa	1–3	4–0	3–0–1	0–2–2	2–1–1	**10–6–4**
Toronto	2–1–1	4–0	2–2	2–2	1–3	**11–8–1**

== Schedule and results ==
1927–28 regular season
November

Game	Result	Date	Score	Opponent	Record
1	L	November 15, 1927	1–6	Montreal Canadiens (1927–28)	0–1–0
2	L	November 20, 1927	1–2	New York Rangers (1927–28)	0–2–0
3	L	November 24, 1927	1–2	Toronto Maple Leafs (1927–28)	0–3–0
4	W	November 26, 1927	4–3 OT	@ Boston Bruins (1927–28)	1–3–0
5	W	November 29, 1927	1–0	Pittsburgh Pirates (1927–28)	2–3–0

December

Game	Result	Date	Score	Opponent	Record
6	L	December 3, 1927	0–4	@ Montreal Canadiens (1927–28)	2–4–0
7	W	December 7, 1927	2–1	@ Chicago Black Hawks (1927–28)	3–4–0
8	L	December 8, 1927	1–2	@ Detroit Cougars (1927–28)	3–5–0
9	W	December 10, 1927	2–0	@ Pittsburgh Pirates (1927–28)	4–5–0
10	W	December 13, 1927	2–1 OT	Ottawa Senators (1927–28)	5–5–0
11	L	December 15, 1927	1–4	@ Ottawa Senators (1927–28)	5–6–0
12	W	December 18, 1927	2–0	Chicago Black Hawks (1927–28)	6–6–0
13	L	December 20, 1927	2–5	@ Toronto Maple Leafs (1927–28)	6–7–0
14	L	December 22, 1927	2–5	Montreal Maroons (1927–28)	6–8–0
15	L	December 24, 1927	2–4	@ Montreal Maroons (1927–28)	6–9–0
16	T	December 27, 1927	4–4 OT	Detroit Cougars (1927–28)	6–9–1
17	T	December 29, 1927	3–3 OT	@ New York Rangers (1927–28)	6–9–2

January

Game	Result	Date	Score	Opponent	Record
18	L	January 1, 1928	2–3	Boston Bruins (1927–28)	6–10–2
19	T	January 5, 1928	0–0 OT	Pittsburgh Pirates (1927–28)	6–10–3
20	L	January 7, 1928	1–4	@ Ottawa Senators (1927–28)	6–11–3
21	W	January 10, 1928	2–1	Toronto Maple Leafs (1927–28)	7–11–3
22	L	January 15, 1928	1–3	Montreal Canadiens (1927–28)	7–12–3
23	W	January 19, 1928	1–0	Montreal Maroons (1927–28)	8–12–3
24	L	January 24, 1928	0–2	Ottawa Senators (1927–28)	8–13–3
25	L	January 29, 1928	0–7	New York Rangers (1927–28)	8–14–3
26	L	January 31, 1928	1–2	@ Boston Bruins (1927–28)	8–15–3

February

Game	Result	Date	Score	Opponent	Record
27	L	February 5, 1928	0–6	Chicago Black Hawks (1927–28)	8–16–3
28	T	February 7, 1928	3–3 OT	@ Montreal Maroons (1927–28)	8–16–4
29	T	February 9, 1928	2–2 OT	Detroit Cougars (1927–28)	8–16–5
30	T	February 11, 1928	2–2 OT	@ Toronto Maple Leafs (1927–28)	8–16–6
31	W	February 14, 1928	1–0	@ Montreal Canadiens (1927–28)	9–16–6
32	L	February 16, 1928	2–3	Toronto Maple Leafs (1927–28)	9–17–6
33	L	February 18, 1928	0–2	@ Pittsburgh Pirates (1927–28)	9–18–6
34	L	February 21, 1928	3–5	Montreal Maroons (1927–28)	9–19–6
35	W	February 26, 1928	1–0	Montreal Canadiens (1927–28)	10–19–6
36	W	February 28, 1928	2–1	@ Chicago Black Hawks (1927–28)	11–19–6

March

Game	Result	Date	Score	Opponent	Record
37	L	March 1, 1928	1–4	@ Detroit Cougars (1927–28)	11–20–6
38	L	March 8, 1928	2–4	@ Toronto Maple Leafs (1927–28)	11–21–6
39	L	March 11, 1928	0–1	Boston Bruins (1927–28)	11–22–6
40	L	March 13, 1928	0–5	@ Montreal Maroons (1927–28)	11–23–6
41	L	March 15, 1928	2–5	Ottawa Senators (1927–28)	11–24–6
42	L	March 18, 1928	3–7	@ New York Rangers (1927–28)	11–25–6
43	L	March 20, 1928	0–5	@ Montreal Canadiens (1927–28)	11–26–6
44	L	March 22, 1928	0–5	@ Ottawa Senators (1927–28)	11–27–6

Legend: Win (2 points) Loss (0 points) Tie (1 point)

== Player statistics ==
=== Regular season ===
Scoring

Player	GP	G	A	Pts	PIM
Normie Himes	44	14	5	19	22
Lionel Conacher	35	11	6	17	82
Billy Burch	32	10	2	12	34
Leo Reise	43	8	1	9	62
Red Green	40	6	1	7	67
Billy Boucher	43	5	2	7	58
Alex McKinnon	43	3	3	6	71
Clarence Boucher	36	2	1	3	129
Joe Simpson	24	2	0	2	32
Marty Barry	9	1	0	1	2
Edmond Bouchard	39	1	0	1	27
Jake Forbes	16	0	0	0	0
Joe Miller	28	0	0	0	0
Sam Rothschild	5	0	0	0	4

Goaltending

Player	MIN	GP	W	L	T	GA	GAA	SA	SV	SV%	SO
Joe Miller	1721	28	8	16	4	77	2.68				5
Jake Forbes	980	16	3	11	2	51	3.12				2
Normie Himes	19	1	0	0	0	0	0.00				0
Team:	2720	44	11	27	6	128	2.82				7

== See also ==
- 1927–28 NHL season
