= 1927–28 Montreal Canadiens season =

NHL hockey team season

1927–28 Montreal Canadiens
- Canadian Division champions
- Division: 1st Canadian
- 1927–28 record: 26–11–7
- Home record: 12–7–3
- Road record: 14–4–4
- Goals for: 116
- Goals against: 48

Team information
- General manager: Leo Dandurand
- Coach: Cecil Hart
- Captain: Sylvio Mantha
- Arena: Montreal Forum

Team leaders
- Goals: Howie Morenz (33)
- Assists: Howie Morenz (18)
- Points: Howie Morenz (51)
- Penalty minutes: Aurele Joliat (103)
- Wins: George Hainsworth (26)
- Goals against average: George Hainsworth (1.05)

The 1927–28 Montreal Canadiens season was the team's 19th season, and 11th in the National Hockey League (NHL). The team improved from its second-place finish to place first in the Canadian Division and qualify for the playoffs. The Canadiens lost in a playoff rematch against the rival Maroons in a two-game total-goals series 3–2.

== Regular season ==
Howie Morenz, the NHL's top drawing card, dominated the scoring race and was runaway winner of the Hart Trophy. He scored 33 goals and led the league in assists as well. The Canadiens, who were running away with the Canadian Division at mid-season, slumped after an injury to Pit Lepine but managed to hold on to first place at season's end.

=== Final standings ===
Canadian Division
	GP	W	L	T	GF	GA	PIM	Pts
**Montreal Canadiens**	44	26	11	7	116	48	496	59
**Montreal Maroons**	44	24	14	6	96	77	549	54
**Ottawa Senators**	44	20	14	10	78	57	483	50
Toronto Maple Leafs	44	18	18	8	89	88	436	44
New York Americans	44	11	27	6	63	128	563	28

Note: W = Wins, L = Losses, T = Ties, GF = Goals For, GA = Goals Against, Pts = Points
Teams that qualified for the playoffs are highlighted in bold.

=== Record vs. opponents ===
==== Vs. Canadian Division ====
1927–28 NHL records
Team	**MTL**	**MTM**	**NYA**	**OTT**	**TOR**	**Total**
M. Canadiens	—	2–2–2	4–2	3–2–1	3–2–1	**12–8–4**
M. Maroons	2–2–2	—	4–1–1	3–2–1	5–0–1	**14–5–5**
N.Y. Americans	2–4	1–4–1	—	1–5	1–4–1	**5–17–2**
Ottawa	2–3–1	2–3–1	5–1	—	1–1–4	**10–8–6**
Toronto	2–3–1	0–5–1	4–1–1	1–1–4	—	**7–10–7**

==== Vs. American Division ====
1927–28 NHL records
Team	**BOS**	**CHI**	**DET**	**NYR**	**PIT**	**Total**
M. Canadiens	2–0–2	4–0	2–2	4–0	2–1–1	**14–3–3**
M. Maroons	2–2	3–1	1–3	2–1–1	2–2	**10–9–1**
N.Y. Americans	1–3	3–1	0–2–2	0–3–1	2–1–1	**6–10–4**
Ottawa	1–3	4–0	3–0–1	0–2–2	2–1–1	**10–6–4**
Toronto	2–1–1	4–0	2–2	2–2	1–3	**11–8–1**

== Schedule and results ==
1927–28 regular season
November

Game	Result	Date	Score	Opponent	Record
1	W	November 15, 1927	6–1	@ New York Americans (1927–28)	1–0–0
2	T	November 19, 1927	1–1 OT	Montreal Maroons (1927–28)	1–0–1
3	W	November 22, 1927	4–0	Pittsburgh Pirates (1927–28)	2–0–1
4	L	November 27, 1927	0–2	@ Detroit Cougars (1927–28)	2–1–1
5	W	November 30, 1927	5–2	@ Chicago Black Hawks (1927–28)	3–1–1

December

Game	Result	Date	Score	Opponent	Record
6	W	December 3, 1927	4–0	New York Americans (1927–28)	4–1–1
7	T	December 6, 1927	1–1 OT	@ Boston Bruins (1927–28)	4–1–2
8	W	December 8, 1927	2–1 OT	Toronto Maple Leafs (1927–28)	5–1–2
9	W	December 11, 1927	2–0	@ New York Rangers (1927–28)	6–1–2
10	W	December 13, 1927	6–1	Detroit Cougars (1927–28)	7–1–2
11	W	December 15, 1927	2–1	@ Montreal Maroons (1927–28)	8–1–2
12	W	December 17, 1927	5–1	Boston Bruins (1927–28)	9–1–2
13	W	December 22, 1927	5–2	Chicago Black Hawks (1927–28)	10–1–2
14	T	December 24, 1927	2–2 OT	@ Pittsburgh Pirates (1927–28)	10–1–3
15	T	December 27, 1927	0–0 OT	@ Ottawa Senators (1927–28)	10–1–4
16	W	December 31, 1927	1–0	New York Rangers (1927–28)	11–1–4

January

Game	Result	Date	Score	Opponent	Record
17	W	January 4, 1928	3–1	@ Chicago Black Hawks (1927–28)	12–1–4
18	W	January 5, 1928	2–1	@ Detroit Cougars (1927–28)	13–1–4
19	W	January 7, 1928	9–1	@ Toronto Maple Leafs (1927–28)	14–1–4
20	W	January 10, 1928	3–0	Ottawa Senators (1927–28)	15–1–4
21	W	January 15, 1928	3–1	@ New York Americans (1927–28)	16–1–4
22	W	January 17, 1928	3–1	@ Boston Bruins (1927–28)	17–1–4
23	L	January 21, 1928	0–1	Montreal Maroons (1927–28)	17–2–4
24	W	January 24, 1928	10–0	Chicago Black Hawks (1927–28)	18–2–4
25	L	January 28, 1928	1–2	Ottawa Senators (1927–28)	18–3–4
26	L	January 31, 1928	1–2	Pittsburgh Pirates (1927–28)	18–4–4

February

Game	Result	Date	Score	Opponent	Record
27	L	February 2, 1928	3–4	Toronto Maple Leafs (1927–28)	18–5–4
28	T	February 4, 1928	0–0 OT	@ Montreal Maroons (1927–28)	18–5–5
29	W	February 7, 1928	2–1	@ Toronto Maple Leafs (1927–28)	19–5–5
30	T	February 11, 1928	1–1 OT	Boston Bruins (1927–28)	19–5–6
31	L	February 14, 1928	0–1	New York Americans (1927–28)	19–6–6
32	L	February 18, 1928	0–1	@ Ottawa Senators (1927–28)	19–7–6
33	T	February 21, 1928	0–0 OT	Toronto Maple Leafs (1927–28)	19–7–7
34	L	February 26, 1928	0–1	@ New York Americans (1927–28)	19–8–7
35	W	February 28, 1928	2–0	@ Ottawa Senators (1927–28)	20–8–7

March

Game	Result	Date	Score	Opponent	Record
36	L	March 3, 1928	2–3 OT	Montreal Maroons (1927–28)	20–9–7
37	W	March 6, 1928	2–1	@ Pittsburgh Pirates (1927–28)	21–9–7
38	W	March 8, 1928	4–3	New York Rangers (1927–28)	22–9–7
39	W	March 10, 1928	3–0	@ Montreal Maroons (1927–28)	23–9–7
40	W	March 13, 1928	4–1	@ New York Rangers (1927–28)	24–9–7
41	L	March 15, 1928	0–1	Detroit Cougars (1927–28)	24–10–7
42	L	March 17, 1928	3–5	@ Toronto Maple Leafs (1927–28)	24–11–7
43	W	March 20, 1928	5–0	New York Americans (1927–28)	25–11–7
44	W	March 24, 1928	4–0	Ottawa Senators (1927–28)	26–11–7

Legend: Win (2 points) Loss (0 points) Tie (1 point)

== Playoffs ==
The Canadiens received a first-round bye and met the Maroons in the semi-finals. In a two-game, total goals series, the series was tied going into sudden-death overtime before Russell Oatman scored the winner at 8:20 to win the series 3–2 ( 2–2, 1–0) for the Maroons.

== Player statistics ==
=== Regular season ===
Scoring

Player	Pos	GP	G	A	Pts	PIM
Howie Morenz	C	43	33	18	51	66
Aurel Joliat	LW	44	28	11	39	105
Art Gagne	RW	44	20	10	30	75
Sylvio Mantha	D	43	4	11	15	61
Albert Leduc	D	42	8	5	13	73
Leo Gaudreault	LW/C	32	6	2	8	24
Herb Gardiner	D	44	4	3	7	26
Pit Lepine	C	20	4	1	5	6
Gizzy Hart	LW	44	3	2	5	4
Wildor Larochelle	RW	40	3	1	4	30
Leo Lafrance	LW	15	1	0	1	2
George Patterson	W	16	0	1	1	0
Marty Burke	D	11	0	0	0	10
George Hainsworth	G	44	0	0	0	0
Charlie Langlois	RW/D	32	0	0	0	14

Goaltending

Player	MIN	GP	W	L	T	GA	GAA	SO
George Hainsworth	2730	44	26	11	7	48	1.05	13
Team:	2730	44	26	11	7	48	1.05	13

=== Playoffs ===
Scoring

Player	Pos	GP	G	A	Pts	PIM
Art Gagne	RW	2	1	1	2	4
Albert Leduc	D	2	1	0	1	5
Herb Gardiner	D	2	0	1	1	4
George Hainsworth	G	2	0	0	0	0
Gizzy Hart	LW	2	0	0	0	0
Aurel Joliat	LW	2	0	0	0	4
Charlie Langlois	RW/D	2	0	0	0	0
Wildor Larochelle	RW	2	0	0	0	0
Pit Lepine	C	1	0	0	0	0
Sylvio Mantha	D	2	0	0	0	6
Howie Morenz	C	2	0	0	0	12

Goaltending

Player	MIN	GP	W	L	GA	GAA	SO
George Hainsworth	128	2	0	1	3	1.41	0
Team:	128	2	0	1	3	1.41	0

Note:

Pos = Position;GP = Games played; G = Goals; A = Assists; Pts = Points; PIM = Penalty minutes; +/- = Plus/minus; PPG = Power-play goals; SHG = Short-handed goals; GWG = Game-winning goals
Pos = Position;GP = Games played; Min, TOI = Minutes played; W = Wins; L = Losses; T,T/OT = Ties; OTL = Overtime losses; GA = Goals-against; GAA = Goals-against average; SO = Shutouts; SA = Shots against; SV = Shots saved;SV% = Save percentage;

== Awards and records ==
- Hart Memorial Trophy – Howie Morenz

== See also ==
- 1927–28 NHL season
