= 1927–28 Montreal Maroons season =

National Hockey League team season

1927–28 Montreal Maroons
- Division: 2nd Canadian
- 1927–28 record: 24–14–6
- Home record: 12–6–4
- Road record: 12–8–2
- Goals for: 96
- Goals against: 77

Team information
- Coach: Eddie Gerard
- Captain: Dunc Munro
- Arena: Montreal Forum

Team leaders
- Goals: Nels Stewart (27)
- Assists: Babe Siebert (9)
- Points: Nels Stewart (34)
- Penalty minutes: Babe Siebert (119)
- Wins: Clint Benedict (24)
- Goals against average: Clint Benedict (1.70)

The 1927–28 Montreal Maroons season was the fourth season for the National Hockey League (NHL) franchise.

== Regular season ==
=== Final standings ===
Canadian Division
	GP	W	L	T	GF	GA	PIM	Pts
**Montreal Canadiens**	44	26	11	7	116	48	496	59
**Montreal Maroons**	44	24	14	6	96	77	549	54
**Ottawa Senators**	44	20	14	10	78	57	483	50
Toronto Maple Leafs	44	18	18	8	89	88	436	44
New York Americans	44	11	27	6	63	128	563	28

Note: W = Wins, L = Losses, T = Ties, GF = Goals For, GA = Goals Against, Pts = Points
Teams that qualified for the playoffs are highlighted in bold.

=== Record vs. opponents ===
==== Vs. Canadian Division ====
1927–28 NHL records
Team	**MTL**	**MTM**	**NYA**	**OTT**	**TOR**	**Total**
M. Canadiens	—	2–2–2	4–2	3–2–1	3–2–1	**12–8–4**
M. Maroons	2–2–2	—	4–1–1	3–2–1	5–0–1	**14–5–5**
N.Y. Americans	2–4	1–4–1	—	1–5	1–4–1	**5–17–2**
Ottawa	2–3–1	2–3–1	5–1	—	1–1–4	**10–8–6**
Toronto	2–3–1	0–5–1	4–1–1	1–1–4	—	**7–10–7**

==== Vs. American Division ====
1927–28 NHL records
Team	**BOS**	**CHI**	**DET**	**NYR**	**PIT**	**Total**
M. Canadiens	2–0–2	4–0	2–2	4–0	2–1–1	**14–3–3**
M. Maroons	2–2	3–1	1–3	2–1–1	2–2	**10–9–1**
N.Y. Americans	1–3	3–1	0–2–2	0–3–1	2–1–1	**6–10–4**
Ottawa	1–3	4–0	3–0–1	0–2–2	2–1–1	**10–6–4**
Toronto	2–1–1	4–0	2–2	2–2	1–3	**11–8–1**

== Schedule and results ==
1927–28 regular season
November

Game	Result	Date	Score	Opponent	Record
1	W	November 15, 1927	2–1	@ Ottawa Senators (1927–28)	1–0–0
2	L	November 17, 1927	2–3	Chicago Black Hawks (1927–28)	1–1–0
3	T	November 19, 1927	1–1 OT	@ Montreal Canadiens (1927–28)	1–1–1
4	W	November 22, 1927	4–3	@ New York Rangers (1927–28)	2–1–1
5	W	November 26, 1927	1–0	Ottawa Senators (1927–28)	3–1–1
6	L	November 29, 1927	0–4	@ Boston Bruins (1927–28)	3–2–1

December

Game	Result	Date	Score	Opponent	Record
7	T	December 1, 1927	1–1 OT	New York Rangers (1927–28)	3–2–2
8	W	December 3, 1927	2–1	@ Toronto Maple Leafs (1927–28)	4–2–2
9	L	December 10, 1927	1–4	Detroit Cougars (1927–28)	4–3–2
10	L	December 15, 1927	1–2	Montreal Canadiens (1927–28)	4–4–2
11	L	December 17, 1927	0–1	@ Ottawa Senators (1927–28)	4–5–2
12	W	December 22, 1927	5–2	@ New York Americans (1927–28)	5–5–2
13	W	December 24, 1927	4–2	New York Americans (1927–28)	6–5–2
14	W	December 28, 1927	4–3	@ Chicago Black Hawks (1927–28)	7–5–2
15	L	December 29, 1927	0–3	@ Detroit Cougars (1927–28)	7–6–2
16	L	December 31, 1927	0–4	@ Pittsburgh Pirates (1927–28)	7–7–2

January

Game	Result	Date	Score	Opponent	Record
17	W	January 5, 1928	2–1	Toronto Maple Leafs (1927–28)	8–7–2
18	W	January 7, 1928	4–1	Boston Bruins (1927–28)	9–7–2
19	W	January 14, 1928	4–0	Pittsburgh Pirates (1927–28)	10–7–2
20	T	January 17, 1928	1–1 OT	Ottawa Senators (1927–28)	10–7–3
21	L	January 19, 1928	0–1	@ New York Americans (1927–28)	10–8–3
22	W	January 21, 1928	1–0	@ Montreal Canadiens (1927–28)	11–8–3
23	W	January 26, 1928	1–0	Toronto Maple Leafs (1927–28)	12–8–3
24	L	January 31, 1928	1–3	@ New York Rangers (1927–28)	12–9–3

February

Game	Result	Date	Score	Opponent	Record
25	L	February 2, 1928	0–1 OT	@ Ottawa Senators (1927–28)	12–10–3
26	T	February 4, 1928	0–0 OT	Montreal Canadiens (1927–28)	12–10–4
27	T	February 7, 1928	3–3 OT	New York Americans (1927–28)	12–10–5
28	W	February 10, 1928	3–2	@ Chicago Black Hawks (1927–28)	13–10–5
29	W	February 11, 1928	3–1	@ Pittsburgh Pirates (1927–28)	14–10–5
30	L	February 16, 1928	0–1	Detroit Cougars (1927–28)	14–11–5
31	W	February 18, 1928	2–1	Toronto Maple Leafs (1927–28)	15–11–5
32	W	February 21, 1928	5–3	@ New York Americans (1927–28)	16–11–5
33	T	February 23, 1928	2–2 OT	@ Toronto Maple Leafs (1927–28)	16–11–6
34	W	February 25, 1928	3–1	Boston Bruins (1927–28)	17–11–6
35	L	February 28, 1928	1–2	@ Boston Bruins (1927–28)	17–12–6

March

Game	Result	Date	Score	Opponent	Record
36	W	March 1, 1928	6–3	Chicago Black Hawks (1927–28)	18–12–6
37	W	March 3, 1928	3–2 OT	@ Montreal Canadiens (1927–28)	19–12–6
38	W	March 6, 1928	3–1	New York Rangers (1927–28)	20–12–6
39	W	March 8, 1928	3–2 OT	@ Detroit Cougars (1927–28)	21–12–6
40	L	March 10, 1928	0–3	Montreal Canadiens (1927–28)	21–13–6
41	W	March 13, 1928	5–0	New York Americans (1927–28)	22–13–6
42	W	March 17, 1928	3–1	Ottawa Senators (1927–28)	23–13–6
43	L	March 22, 1928	1–2	Pittsburgh Pirates (1927–28)	23–14–6
44	W	March 24, 1928	8–4	@ Toronto Maple Leafs (1927–28)	24–14–6

Legend: Win (2 points) Loss (0 points) Tie (1 point)

== Playoffs ==
The Maroons made it into the playoffs. They defeated Ottawa in the first round 3 goals to 1 or 3–1. They went against the Canadiens in the second round and won 3 goals to 2, or 3–2. The 2nd game was a reversal of fortune from previous year against Montreal Canadiens, when Howie Morenz eliminated them with an overtime goal. This year it was Maroons Russell Oatman who provided the margin of victory, at 8:10 of overtime, to upset the 1st place Canadiens. They went against the Rangers in the finals in a best of five and lost in 5 games, or 3–2. All games were played at the Montreal Forum with New York's Madison Square Gardens unavailable due a circus. Forty-four-year-old Rangers coach/manager Lester Patrick replaced the injured Lorne Chabot in game 2 and backstopped New York to 2–1 overtime victory. After Maroons won game 3, 2–0, with Clint Benedict recording his NHL record 15th and final shutout, Rangers came back to win games 4 and 5 and secure the Stanley Cup. Goaltender Joe Miller was loaned to New York by New York Americans for the final 3 games of the series as an injury replacement.

== Player statistics ==
Regular season
Scoring

Player	Pos	GP	G	A	Pts	PIM
Nels Stewart	C	41	27	7	34	104
Hooley Smith	C/RW	34	14	5	19	72
Babe Siebert	LW/D	39	8	9	17	109
Joe Lamb	RW	21	8	5	13	39
Red Dutton	D	42	7	6	13	94
Jimmy Ward	RW	42	10	2	12	44
Merlyn Phillips	C	40	7	5	12	33
Russell Oatman	LW	43	7	4	11	36
Dunc Munro	D	43	5	2	7	35
Bill Touhey	LW	29	2	0	2	2
Fred Brown	LW	19	1	0	1	0
Frank Carson	RW	21	0	1	1	10
Hap Emms	LW/D	10	0	1	1	10
Clint Benedict	G	44	0	0	0	0
Flat Walsh	G	1	0	0	0	0

Goaltending

Player	MIN	GP	W	L	T	GA	GAA	SO
Clint Benedict	2690	44	24	14	6	76	1.70	6
Flat Walsh	40	1	0	0	0	1	1.50	0
Team:	2730	44	24	14	6	77	1.69	6

Playoffs
Scoring

Player	Pos	GP	G	A	Pts	PIM
Nels Stewart	C	9	2	2	4	13
Merlyn Phillips	C	9	2	1	3	9
Hooley Smith	C/RW	9	2	1	3	23
Babe Siebert	LW/D	9	2	0	2	26
Jimmy Ward	RW	9	1	1	2	6
Dunc Munro	D	9	0	2	2	8
Red Dutton	D	9	1	0	1	27
Joe Lamb	RW	8	1	0	1	32
Russell Oatman	LW	9	1	0	1	18
Clint Benedict	G	9	0	0	0	0
Fred Brown	LW	9	0	0	0	0
Frank Carson	RW	9	0	0	0	0

Goaltending

Player	MIN	GP	W	L	GA	GAA	SO
Clint Benedict	555	9	5	3	8	0.86	4
Team:	555	9	5	3	8	0.86	4

Note: Pos = Position; GP = Games played; G = Goals; A = Assists; Pts = Points; PIM = Penalty minutes
MIN = Minutes played; W = Wins; L = Losses; T = Ties; GA = Goals-against; GAA = Goals-against average; SO = Shutouts;

== See also ==
- 1927–28 NHL season
