= 1927–28 Toronto Maple Leafs season =

NHL hockey team season

1927–28 Toronto Maple Leafs
- Division: 4th Canadian
- 1927–28 record: 18–18–8
- Home record: 9–8–5
- Road record: 9–10–3
- Goals for: 89
- Goals against: 88

Team information
- General manager: Conn Smythe
- Coach: Conn Smythe
- Captain: Hap Day
- Arena: Arena Gardens

Team leaders
- Goals: Bill Carson (20)
- Assists: Hap Day (8)
- Points: Bill Carson (26)
- Penalty minutes: Art Duncan (101)
- Wins: John Ross Roach (18)
- Goals against average: John Ross Roach (1.96)

The 1927–28 Toronto Maple Leafs season was the first under the Maple Leafs name for the Toronto National Hockey League (NHL) franchise. The club finished in fourth to miss the playoffs for the third year in a row, for the first time in franchise history.

== Offseason ==
Conn Smythe left his duties as coach at the University of Toronto and became the general manager and coach of the Leafs. Smythe would be general manager for 30 years. Smythe put team captain Bert Corbeau on waivers in October. Corbeau cleared waivers and joined Toronto Ravinia of the Canadian-American Professional Hockey League. Smythe named Hap Day as team captain.

== Regular season ==
=== Final standings ===
Canadian Division
	GP	W	L	T	GF	GA	PIM	Pts
**Montreal Canadiens**	44	26	11	7	116	48	496	59
**Montreal Maroons**	44	24	14	6	96	77	549	54
**Ottawa Senators**	44	20	14	10	78	57	483	50
Toronto Maple Leafs	44	18	18	8	89	88	436	44
New York Americans	44	11	27	6	63	128	563	28

Note: W = Wins, L = Losses, T = Ties, GF = Goals For, GA = Goals Against, Pts = Points
Teams that qualified for the playoffs are highlighted in bold.

=== Record vs. opponents ===
==== Vs. Canadian Division ====
1927–28 NHL records
Team	MTL	MTM	NYA	OTT	TOR	Total
M. Canadiens	—	2–2–2	4–2	3–2–1	3–2–1	**12–8–4**
M. Maroons	2–2–2	—	4–1–1	3–2–1	5–0–1	**14–5–5**
N.Y. Americans	2–4	1–4–1	—	1–5	1–4–1	**5–17–2**
Ottawa	2–3–1	2–3–1	5–1	—	1–1–4	**10–8–6**
Toronto	2–3–1	0–5–1	4–1–1	1–1–4	—	**7–10–7**

==== Vs. American Division ====
1927–28 NHL records
Team	BOS	CHI	DET	NYR	PIT	Total
M. Canadiens	2–0–2	4–0	2–2	4–0	2–1–1	**14–3–3**
M. Maroons	2–2	3–1	1–3	2–1–1	2–2	**10–9–1**
N.Y. Americans	1–3	3–1	0–2–2	0–3–1	2–1–1	**6–10–4**
Ottawa	1–3	4–0	3–0–1	0–2–2	2–1–1	**10–6–4**
Toronto	2–1–1	4–0	2–2	2–2	1–3	**11–8–1**

== Schedule and results ==
1927–28 regular season
November

Game	Result	Date	Score	Opponent	Record
1	L	November 15, 1927	2–4	New York Rangers (1927–28)	0–1–0
2	W	November 19, 1927	4–2	Chicago Black Hawks (1927–28)	1–1–0
3	L	November 22, 1927	0–1	@ Boston Bruins (1927–28)	1–2–0
4	W	November 24, 1927	2–1	@ New York Americans (1927–28)	2–2–0
5	W	November 26, 1927	2–1 OT	@ Pittsburgh Pirates (1927–28)	3–2–0

December

Game	Result	Date	Score	Opponent	Record
6	L	December 3, 1927	1–2	Montreal Maroons (1927–28)	3–3–0
7	T	December 6, 1927	0–0 OT	@ Ottawa Senators (1927–28)	3–3–1
8	L	December 8, 1927	1–2 OT	@ Montreal Canadiens (1927–28)	3–4–1
9	T	December 10, 1927	0–0 OT	Ottawa Senators (1927–28)	3–4–2
10	W	December 14, 1927	4–2	@ Chicago Black Hawks (1927–28)	4–4–2
11	L	December 17, 1927	0–1 OT	Detroit Cougars (1927–28)	4–5–2
12	W	December 20, 1927	5–2	New York Americans (1927–28)	5–5–2
13	L	December 22, 1927	2–3 OT	Pittsburgh Pirates (1927–28)	5–6–2
14	T	December 24, 1927	1–1 OT	@ Ottawa Senators (1927–28)	5–6–3
15	W	December 29, 1927	2–1	Boston Bruins (1927–28)	6–6–3

January

Game	Result	Date	Score	Opponent	Record
16	W	January 2, 1928	4–1	@ Chicago Black Hawks (1927–28)	7–6–3
17	L	January 5, 1928	1–2	@ Montreal Maroons (1927–28)	7–7–3
18	L	January 7, 1928	1–9	Montreal Canadiens (1927–28)	7–8–3
19	L	January 10, 1928	1–2	@ New York Americans (1927–28)	7–9–3
20	W	January 12, 1928	2–1	@ Detroit Cougars (1927–28)	8–9–3
21	W	January 14, 1928	6–1	New York Rangers (1927–28)	9–9–3
22	W	January 17, 1928	2–1	@ New York Rangers (1927–28)	10–9–3
23	W	January 21, 1928	2–1	Ottawa Senators (1927–28)	11–9–3
24	L	January 26, 1928	0–1	@ Montreal Maroons (1927–28)	11–10–3
25	W	January 28, 1928	4–1	Chicago Black Hawks (1927–28)	12–10–3
26	L	January 31, 1928	0–4	@ Ottawa Senators (1927–28)	12–11–3

February

Game	Result	Date	Score	Opponent	Record
27	W	February 2, 1928	4–3	@ Montreal Canadiens (1927–28)	13–11–3
28	W	February 4, 1928	2–0	Detroit Cougars (1927–28)	14–11–3
29	L	February 7, 1928	1–2	Montreal Canadiens (1927–28)	14–12–3
30	T	February 11, 1928	2–2 OT	New York Americans (1927–28)	14–12–4
31	L	February 14, 1928	2–4	Pittsburgh Pirates (1927–28)	14–13–4
32	W	February 16, 1928	3–2	@ New York Americans (1927–28)	15–13–4
33	L	February 18, 1928	1–2	@ Montreal Maroons (1927–28)	15–14–4
34	T	February 21, 1928	0–0 OT	@ Montreal Canadiens (1927–28)	15–14–5
35	T	February 23, 1928	2–2 OT	Montreal Maroons (1927–28)	15–14–6
36	L	February 28, 1928	0–1	@ New York Rangers (1927–28)	15–15–6

March

Game	Result	Date	Score	Opponent	Record
37	L	March 1, 1928	2–4	@ Pittsburgh Pirates (1927–28)	15–16–6
38	T	March 3, 1928	0–0 OT	Boston Bruins (1927–28)	15–16–7
39	L	March 6, 1928	1–3	@ Detroit Cougars (1927–28)	15–17–7
40	W	March 8, 1928	4–2	New York Americans (1927–28)	16–17–7
41	T	March 13, 1928	1–1 OT	Ottawa Senators (1927–28)	16–17–8
42	W	March 17, 1928	5–3	Montreal Canadiens (1927–28)	17–17–8
43	W	March 20, 1928	6–2	@ Boston Bruins (1927–28)	18–17–8
44	L	March 24, 1928	4–8	Montreal Maroons (1927–28)	18–18–8

Legend: Win (2 points) Loss (0 points) Tie (1 point)

== Player statistics ==
=== Regular season ===
Scoring

Player	Pos	GP	G	A	Pts	PIM
Bill Carson	C	32	20	6	26	36
Hap Day	D	22	9	8	17	48
Butch Keeling	LW	43	10	6	16	52
Danny Cox	LW	41	9	6	15	27
Ace Bailey	RW	43	9	3	12	72
Art Duncan	D	43	7	5	12	97
Gerry Lowrey	LW	25	6	5	11	29
Eddie Rodden	C	25	3	6	9	36
Jimmy Herbert	C/RW	31	7	1	8	40
Art Smith	D	15	5	3	8	22
Bert McCaffrey	RW/D	9	1	1	2	9
Beattie Ramsay	D	43	0	2	2	10
George Patterson	W	12	1	0	1	14
Ed Gorman	D	19	0	1	1	30
Joe Ironstone	G	1	0	0	0	0
Joe Primeau	C	2	0	0	0	0
John Ross Roach	G	43	0	0	0	0

Goaltending

Player	MIN	GP	W	L	T	GA	GAA	SO
John Ross Roach	2690	43	18	18	7	88	1.96	4
Joe Ironstone	70	1	0	0	1	0	0.00	1
Team:	2760	44	18	18	8	88	1.91	5

Note:

Pos = Position;GP = Games played; G = Goals; A = Assists; Pts = Points; PIM = Penalty minutes; +/- = Plus/minus; PPG = Power-play goals; SHG = Short-handed goals; GWG = Game-winning goals
Pos = Position;GP = Games played; Min, TOI = Minutes played; W = Wins; L = Losses; T,T/OT = Ties; OTL = Overtime losses; GA = Goals-against; GAA = Goals-against average; SO = Shutouts; SA = Shots against; SV = Shots saved;SV% = Save percentage;

== Playoffs ==
The Maple Leafs did not qualify for the playoffs.

== Transactions ==
- May 16, 1927: Acquired Art Duncan from Victoria Cougars (PCHL) for Bill Brydge
- October 20, 1927: Lost Free Agent Bert Corbeau to the Toronto Ravinas of the CPHL
- October 20, 1927: Acquired Gerry Lowrey from the London Panthers of the CPHL for Albert Pudas
- October 26, 1927: Acquired Ed Gorman from the Ottawa Senators for cash
- October 27, 1927: Signed Free Agent Art Smith
- November 1, 1927: Lost Free Agent Haldor Halderson to the Quebec Castors of the Can-Am League
- November 5, 1927: Traded Art Duncan to the Pittsburgh Pirates for cash
- December 1, 1927: Acquired Eddie Rodden from the Chicago Black Hawks; Traded Bert McCaffrey to the Pittsburgh Pirates in three-team trade
- December 21, 1927: Acquired Jimmy Herbert from the Boston Bruins for Eric Pettinger and $15,000
- January 1, 1928: Acquired Benny Grant on loan from the London Panthers of the CPHL for cash
- February 8, 1928: Traded George Patterson to the Montreal Canadiens for cash
- February 13, 1928: Traded Ed Gorman to the Kitchener Millionaires of the CPHL
- April 8, 1928: Acquired Jack Arbour and $12,500 from the Detroit Cougars for Jimmy Herbert
- April 16, 1928: Acquired Alex Gray from the New York Rangers for Butch Keeling

== See also ==
- 1927–28 NHL season
