= 1927–28 Ottawa Senators season =

National Hockey League team season

1927–28 Ottawa Senators
- Division: 3rd Canadian
- 1927–28 record: 20–14–10
- Home record: 13–4–5
- Road record: 7–10–5
- Goals for: 78
- Goals against: 57

Team information
- General manager: Dave Gill
- Coach: Dave Gill
- Captain: Buck Boucher
- Arena: Ottawa Auditorium

Team leaders
- Goals: Frank Finnigan (20)
- Assists: King Clancy (7)
- Points: Frank Finnigan (25)
- Penalty minutes: Alex Smith (90)
- Wins: Alec Connell (20)
- Goals against average: Alec Connell (1.24)

The 1927–28 Ottawa Senators season was the club's 11th season in the NHL, 43rd overall. Ottawa qualified for the playoffs to try to win their second-straight Stanley Cup; however, they were eliminated by the Montreal Maroons in a two-game total-goals series, losing by a combined score of 3–1.

== Regular season ==
The Senators were playing in by far the smallest market in the league, and were having problems financially due to escalating expenses. Part of the problem for the Senators was they had problems drawing fans against the expansion US teams, and as a result, they would play two "home" games in Detroit, collecting the bulk of the gate receipts.

The Senators would be led offensively by Frank Finnigan, who scored 20 goals and 25 points, both team highs, while 20-year-old Hec Kilrea would have a 23-point season. King Clancy would be the anchor of the Ottawa defense, and put up 15 points, along with 73 PIM. Cy Denneny would struggle all year long though, collecting only three goals, while the return of Punch Broadbent proved to be disastrous, as he only collected five points.

In goal, Alec Connell would have another strong season, earning 20 wins, having an NHL best 15 shutouts, and a 1.24 GAA. Connell would set an NHL record for longest shutout streak, as he did not allow a goal in 464 minutes and 29 seconds, recording six shutouts during the streak.

=== Final standings ===
Canadian Division
	GP	W	L	T	GF	GA	PIM	Pts
**Montreal Canadiens**	44	26	11	7	116	48	496	59
**Montreal Maroons**	44	24	14	6	96	77	549	54
**Ottawa Senators**	44	20	14	10	78	57	483	50
Toronto Maple Leafs	44	18	18	8	89	88	436	44
New York Americans	44	11	27	6	63	128	563	28

Note: W = Wins, L = Losses, T = Ties, GF = Goals For, GA = Goals Against, Pts = Points
Teams that qualified for the playoffs are highlighted in bold.

=== Record vs. opponents ===
==== Vs. Canadian Division ====
1927–28 NHL records
Team	MTL	MTM	NYA	OTT	TOR	Total
M. Canadiens	—	2–2–2	4–2	3–2–1	3–2–1	**12–8–4**
M. Maroons	2–2–2	—	4–1–1	3–2–1	5–0–1	**14–5–5**
N.Y. Americans	2–4	1–4–1	—	1–5	1–4–1	**5–17–2**
Ottawa	2–3–1	2–3–1	5–1	—	1–1–4	**10–8–6**
Toronto	2–3–1	0–5–1	4–1–1	1–1–4	—	**7–10–7**

==== Vs. American Division ====
1927–28 NHL records
Team	BOS	CHI	DET	NYR	PIT	Total
M. Canadiens	2–0–2	4–0	2–2	4–0	2–1–1	**14–3–3**
M. Maroons	2–2	3–1	1–3	2–1–1	2–2	**10–9–1**
N.Y. Americans	1–3	3–1	0–2–2	0–3–1	2–1–1	**6–10–4**
Ottawa	1–3	4–0	3–0–1	0–2–2	2–1–1	**10–6–4**
Toronto	2–1–1	4–0	2–2	2–2	1–3	**11–8–1**

== Schedule and results ==
1927–28 regular season
November: 3–4–0 (home: 1–2–0; road: 2–2–0)

Game	Date	Visitor	Score	Home	OT	Decision	Attendance	Arena	Record	Pts
1	November 15	Maroons	2–1	Ottawa	OT	Connell	N/A	Ottawa Auditorium	0–1–0	0
2	November 17	Ottawa	2–3	Rangers		Connell	N/A	Madison Square Garden	0–2–0	0
3	November 19	Pittsburgh	1–3	Ottawa		Connell	N/A	Ottawa Auditorium	1–2–0	2
4	November 22	Ottawa	2–1	Detroit		Connell	N/A	Detroit Olympia	2–2–0	4
5	November 23	Ottawa	2–0	Chicago		Connell	N/A	Chicago Coliseum	3–2–0	6
6	November 26	Ottawa	0–1	Maroons		Connell	N/A	Montreal Forum	3–3–0	6
7	November 29	Rangers	2–1	Ottawa		Connell	N/A	Ottawa Auditorium	3–4–0	6

December: 4–2–4 (home: 4–0–3; road: 0–2–1)

Game	Date	Visitor	Score	Home	OT	Decision	Attendance	Arena	Record	Pts
8	December 3	Boston	2–3	Ottawa		Connell	N/A	Ottawa Auditorium	4–4–0	8
9	December 6	Toronto	0–0	Ottawa	OT	Connell	N/A	Ottawa Auditorium	4–4–1	9
10	December 10	Ottawa	0–0	Toronto	OT	Connell	N/A	Mutual Street Arena	4–4–2	10
11	December 13	Ottawa	1–2	Americans	OT	Connell	N/A	Madison Square Garden	4–5–2	10
12	December 15	Americans	1–4	Ottawa		Connell	N/A	Ottawa Auditorium	5–5–2	12
13	December 17	Maroons	0–1	Ottawa		Connell	N/A	Ottawa Auditorium	6–5–2	14
14	December 20	Ottawa	0–1	Boston		Connell	N/A	Boston Arena	6–6–2	14
15	December 24	Toronto	1–1	Ottawa		Connell	N/A	Ottawa Auditorium	6–6–3	15
16	December 27	Canadiens	0–0	Ottawa		Connell	N/A	Ottawa Auditorium	6–6–4	16
17	December 31	Detroit	2–6	Ottawa		Connell	N/A	Detroit Olympia	7–6–4	18

January: 5–4–1 (home: 3–1–0; road: 2–3–1)

Game	Date	Visitor	Score	Home	OT	Decision	Attendance	Arena	Record	Pts
18	January 7	Americans	1–4	Ottawa		Connell	N/A	Ottawa Auditorium	8–6–4	20
19	January 10	Ottawa	0–3	Canadiens		Connell	N/A	Montreal Forum	8–7–4	20
20	January 14	Boston	4–2	Ottawa		Connell	N/A	Ottawa Auditorium	8–8–4	20
21	January 17	Ottawa	1–1	Maroons	OT	Connell	N/A	Montreal Forum	8–8–5	21
22	January 19	Ottawa	1–3	Pittsburgh		Connell	N/A	Duquesne Garden	8–9–5	21
23	January 21	Ottawa	1–2	Toronto		Connell	N/A	Mutual Street Arena	8–10–5	21
24	January 24	Ottawa	2–0	Americans		Connell	N/A	Madison Square Garden	9–10–5	23
25	January 26	Chicago	6–9	Ottawa		Connell	N/A	Ottawa Auditorium	10–10–5	25
26	January 28	Ottawa	2–1	Canadiens		Connell	N/A	Montreal Forum	11–10–5	27
27	January 31	Toronto	0–4	Ottawa		Connell	N/A	Ottawa Auditorium	12–10–5	29

February: 4–1–4 (home: 2–1–2; road: 2–0–2)

Game	Date	Visitor	Score	Home	OT	Decision	Attendance	Arena	Record	Pts
28	February 2	Maroons	0–1	Ottawa	OT	Connell	N/A	Ottawa Auditorium	13–10–5	31
29	February 7	Ottawa	0–0	Rangers	OT	Connell	N/A	Madison Square Garden	13–10–6	32
30	February 9	Rangers	0–0	Ottawa	OT	Connell	N/A	Ottawa Auditorium	13–10–7	33
31	February 16	Pittsburgh	0–0	Ottawa	OT	Connell	N/A	Ottawa Auditorium	13–10–8	34
32	February 18	Canadiens	0–1	Ottawa		Connell	N/A	Ottawa Auditorium	14–10–8	36
33	February 22	Ottawa	3–2	Chicago		Connell	N/A	Chicago Coliseum	15–10–8	38
34	February 23	Ottawa	0–0	Detroit	OT	Connell	N/A	Detroit Olympia	15–10–9	39
35	February 25	Ottawa	2–0	Pittsburgh		Connell	N/A	Duquesne Garden	16–10–9	41
36	February 28	Canadiens	2–0	Ottawa		Connell	N/A	Ottawa Auditorium	16–11–9	41

March: 4–3–1 (home: 3–0–0; road: 1–3–1)

Game	Date	Visitor	Score	Home	OT	Decision	Attendance	Arena	Record	Pts
37	March 3	Chicago	1–3	Ottawa		Connell	N/A	Ottawa Auditorium	17–11–9	43
38	March 6	Ottawa	2–0	Boston		Connell	N/A	Boston Arena	17–12–9	43
39	March 10	Detroit	1–3	Ottawa		Connell	N/A	Detroit Olympia	18–12–9	45
40	March 13	Ottawa	1–1	Toronto		Connell	N/A	Mutual Street Arena	18–12–10	46
41	March 15	Ottawa	5–2	Americans		Connell	N/A	Madison Square Garden	19–12–10	48
42	March 17	Ottawa	1–3	Maroons		Connell	N/A	Montreal Forum	19–13–10	48
43	March 22	Americans	0–5	Ottawa		Connell	N/A	Ottawa Auditorium	20–13–10	50
44	March 24	Ottawa	0–4	Canadiens		Connell	N/A	Montreal Forum	20–14–10	50

Legend: Win (2 points) Loss (0 points) Tie (1 point)

== Playoffs ==
=== Montreal Maroons 3, Ottawa Senators 1 ===
The Senators played the Montreal Maroons in a first round two-game, total-goals series. The Maroons won the series by three goals to one.

1928 Stanley Cup playoffs
Quarterfinals vs. (C2) Montreal Maroons – Maroons win 3 goals to 1 goals

Game	Date	Visitor	Score	Home	OT	Decision	Attendance	Arena	Series
1	March 27	Maroons	1–0	Ottawa		Connell	N/A	Ottawa Auditorium	0–1
2	March 29	Ottawa	1–2	Maroons		Connell	N/A	Montreal Forum	1–3

Legend: Win Loss Tie

== Player statistics ==
=== Regular season ===
Scoring

Player	Pos	GP	G	A	Pts	PIM
Frank Finnigan	RW	38	20	5	25	34
Hec Kilrea	LW	43	19	4	23	66
King Clancy	D	39	8	7	15	73
Alex Smith	D	44	9	4	13	90
Frank Nighbor	C	42	8	5	13	46
Georges Boucher	D	43	7	5	12	78
Punch Broadbent	RW	43	3	2	5	62
Cy Denneny	LW	44	3	0	3	12
Len Grosvenor	C/RW	43	1	2	3	18
Al Shields	D	7	0	1	1	2
Gene Chouinard	D	8	0	0	0	0
Alec Connell	G	44	0	0	0	0
Sam Godin	RW	24	0	0	0	0
Milt Halliday	LW	13	0	0	0	2

Goaltending

Player	MIN	GP	W	L	T	GA	GAA	SO
Alec Connell	2760	44	20	14	10	57	1.24	15
Team:	2760	44	20	14	10	57	1.24	15

=== Playoffs ===
Scoring

Player	Pos	GP	G	A	Pts	PIM
Hec Kilrea	LW	2	1	0	1	0
Frank Finnigan	RW	2	0	1	1	6
Georges Boucher	D	2	0	0	0	4
Punch Broadbent	RW	2	0	0	0	0
King Clancy	D	2	0	0	0	6
Alec Connell	G	2	0	0	0	0
Cy Denneny	LW	2	0	0	0	0
Len Grosvenor	C/RW	2	0	0	0	2
Frank Nighbor	C	2	0	0	0	2
Al Shields	D	2	0	0	0	0
Alex Smith	D	2	0	0	0	4

Goaltending

Player	MIN	GP	W	L	GA	GAA	SO
Alec Connell	120	2	0	2	3	1.50	0
Team:	120	2	0	2	3	1.50	0

Note:

Pos = Position;GP = Games played; G = Goals; A = Assists; Pts = Points; PIM = Penalty minutes; +/- = Plus/minus; PPG = Power-play goals; SHG = Short-handed goals; GWG = Game-winning goals
Pos = Position;GP = Games played; Min, TOI = Minutes played; W = Wins; L = Losses; T,T/OT = Ties; OTL = Overtime losses; GA = Goals-against; GAA = Goals-against average; SO = Shutouts; SA = Shots against; SV = Shots saved;SV% = Save percentage;

== Transactions ==
The Senators were involved in the following transactions during the 1927–28 season.

=== Trades ===
October 7, 1927	To Ottawa Senators Punch Broadbent $22,500	To Montreal Maroons Hooley Smith
October 26, 1927	To Ottawa Senators Cash	To Toronto Maple Leafs Edwin Gorman
February 1, 1927	To Ottawa Senators Cash	To London Panthers (Can-Pro) Stan Jackson

=== Free agents signed ===
October 24, 1927	From Ottawa Rideaus (OCHL) Len Grosvenor
December 19, 1927	From Quebec Castors (Can-Am) Gene Chouinard
January 24, 1928	From Rockland Hockey Club (OVHL) Sammy Godin
March 3, 1928	From New Haven Eagles (Can-Am) Allan Shields

== See also ==
- 1927–28 NHL season
