= 1927–28 Boston Bruins season =

NHL team season

1927–28 Boston Bruins
- American Division champions
- Division: 1st American
- 1927–28 record: 20–13–11 (51 points)
- Home record: 13–4–5
- Road record: 7–9–6
- Goals for: 77
- Goals against: 70

Team information
- General manager: Art Ross
- Coach: Art Ross
- Captain: Sprague Cleghorn
- Arena: Boston Arena
- Average attendance: 6,773

Team leaders
- Goals: Harry Oliver (13)
- Assists: Eddie Shore (6)
- Points: Harry Oliver (18)
- Penalty minutes: Eddie Shore (165)
- Wins: Hal Winkler (20)
- Goals against average: Hal Winkler (1.51)

The 1927–28 Boston Bruins season was the team's fourth in the NHL. The Bruins finished first in the American Division, marking its first division title in franchise history and its second playoff appearance. The team lost in the playoffs to the eventual Stanley Cup champion New York Rangers.

== Offseason ==
The league adopted a goal net designed by Bruins general manager Art Ross; the so-called "Ross goal" would be the standard net into the 1980s.

Prominent newcomers included Dutch Gainor and Dit Clapper, both of whose rights were purchased from the minor leagues, and who would make a significant impact with the Bruins down the years. The Bruins also obtained Fred Gordon in the offseason, acquiring him from the Detroit Cougars for Harry Meeking, while Red Stuart was traded to Boston's Minneapolis minor league team, for the rights to Gainor and Nobby Clark.

== Regular season ==
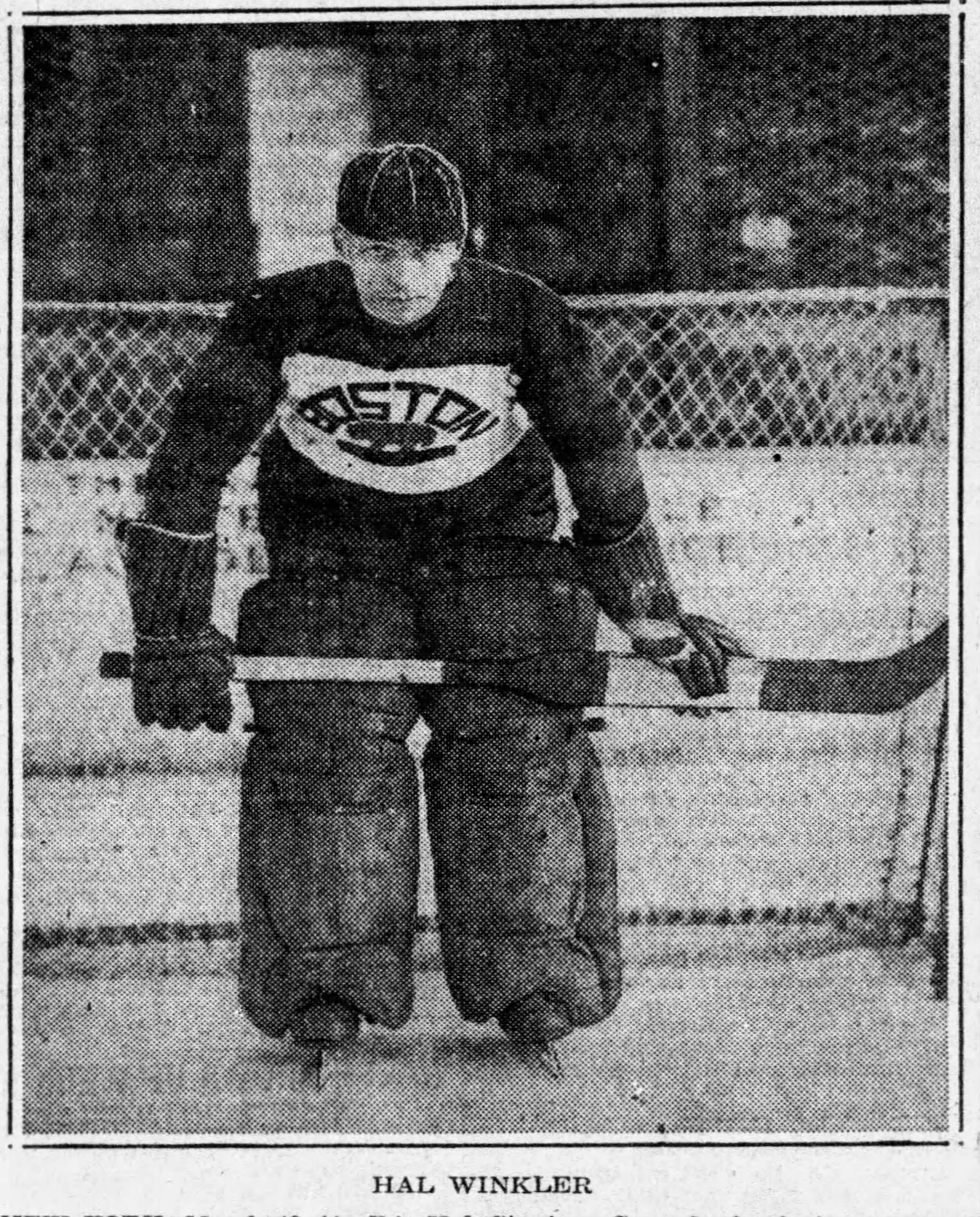
Winkler as a Bruin during the 1927–28 season

For the second straight season, Harry Oliver led the Bruins in scoring, and although the team's attack was relatively anemic – the Bruins finished with 77 goals, leading only the last-place teams in both divisions, the Chicago Black Hawks and the New York Americans – they cut down sharply in goals allowed, leading the division behind Hal Winkler's goaltending. Eddie Shore was the team's great star, finishing just one point behind Oliver in scoring and leading the league in penalty minutes by a wide margin.

Winkler in his own turn had fifteen shutouts, tied with Alex Connell for the league lead and a new NHL record; Winkler's mark remains the Bruins' single-season record for shutouts, over ninety years later, and is still tied for the second-most shutouts recorded in a single season. Although veteran Sprague Cleghorn was fading and missed a quarter of the season with injuries, Shore and defense partner Lionel Hitchman were ironmen, playing most of each game.

With Boston's first-place finish, the Bruins became the first team to win the Prince of Wales Trophy, awarded for the first time in this season.

=== Final standings ===
American Division
| | GP | W | L | T | GF | GA | PIM | Pts |
|---|---|---|---|---|---|---|---|---|
| **Boston Bruins** | 44 | 20 | 13 | 11 | 77 | 70 | 558 | 51 |
| **New York Rangers** | 44 | 19 | 16 | 9 | 94 | 79 | 462 | 47 |
| **Pittsburgh Pirates** | 44 | 19 | 17 | 8 | 67 | 76 | 395 | 46 |
| Detroit Cougars | 44 | 19 | 19 | 6 | 88 | 79 | 395 | 44 |
| Chicago Black Hawks | 44 | 7 | 34 | 3 | 68 | 134 | 375 | 17 |

Note: GP = Games Played, W = Wins, L = Losses, T = Ties, Pts = Points, GF = Goals For, GA = Goals Against
Teams that qualified for the playoffs are highlighted in bold.

=== Record vs. opponents ===
==== Vs. American Division ====
1927–28 NHL records
| Team | BOS | CHI | DET | NYR | PIT | Total |
|---|---|---|---|---|---|---|
| Boston | — | 4–0–2 | 4–2 | 2–1–3 | 1–2–3 | **11–5–8** |
| Chicago | 0–4–2 | — | 2–3–1 | 2–4 | 1–5 | **5–16–3** |
| Detroit | 2–4 | 3–2–1 | — | 2–3–1 | 3–2–1 | **10–11–3** |
| N.Y. Rangers | 1–2–3 | 4–2 | 3–2–1 | — | 3–2–1 | **11–8–5** |
| Pittsburgh | 2–1–3 | 5–1 | 2–3–1 | 2–3–1 | — | **11–8–5** |

==== Vs. Canadian Division ====
1927–28 NHL records
| Team | MTL | MTM | NYA | OTT | TOR | Total |
|---|---|---|---|---|---|---|
| Boston | 0–2–2 | 2–2 | 3–1 | 3–1 | 1–2–1 | **9–8–3** |
| Chicago | 0–4 | 1–3 | 1–3 | 0–4 | 0–4 | **2–18–0** |
| Detroit | 2–2 | 3–1 | 2–0–2 | 0–3–1 | 2–2 | **9–8–3** |
| N.Y. Rangers | 0–4 | 1–2–1 | 3–0–1 | 2–0–2 | 2–2 | **8–8–4** |
| Pittsburgh | 1–2–1 | 2–2 | 1–2–1 | 1–2–1 | 3–1 | **8–9–3** |

== Schedule and results ==
1927–28 regular season
November

| Game | Result | Date | Score | Opponent | Record |
|---|---|---|---|---|---|
| 1 | T | November 15, 1927 | 1–1 OT | Chicago Black Hawks (1927–28) | 0–0–1 |
| 2 | W | November 19, 1927 | 5–2 | Detroit Cougars (1927–28) | 1–0–1 |
| 3 | W | November 22, 1927 | 1–0 | Toronto Maple Leafs (1927–28) | 2–0–1 |
| 4 | L | November 26, 1927 | 3–4 OT | New York Americans (1927–28) | 2–1–1 |
| 5 | T | November 27, 1927 | 1–1 OT | @ New York Rangers (1927–28) | 2–1–2 |
| 6 | W | November 29, 1927 | 4–0 | Montreal Maroons (1927–28) | 3–1–2 |

December

| Game | Result | Date | Score | Opponent | Record |
|---|---|---|---|---|---|
| 7 | T | December 1, 1927 | 0–0 OT | @ Pittsburgh Pirates (1927–28) | 3–1–3 |
| 8 | L | December 3, 1927 | 2–3 | @ Ottawa Senators (1927–28) | 3–2–3 |
| 9 | T | December 6, 1927 | 1–1 OT | Montreal Canadiens (1927–28) | 3–2–4 |
| 10 | W | December 10, 1927 | 2–0 | @ Chicago Black Hawks (1927–28) | 4–2–4 |
| 11 | W | December 11, 1927 | 2–1 OT | @ Detroit Cougars (1927–28) | 5–2–4 |
| 12 | L | December 13, 1927 | 2–3 | New York Rangers (1927–28) | 5–3–4 |
| 13 | L | December 17, 1927 | 1–5 | @ Montreal Canadiens (1927–28) | 5–4–4 |
| 14 | W | December 20, 1927 | 1–0 | Ottawa Senators (1927–28) | 6–4–4 |
| 15 | W | December 27, 1927 | 2–0 | New York Rangers (1927–28) | 7–4–4 |
| 16 | L | December 29, 1927 | 1–2 | @ Toronto Maple Leafs (1927–28) | 7–5–4 |

January

| Game | Result | Date | Score | Opponent | Record |
|---|---|---|---|---|---|
| 17 | W | January 1, 1928 | 3–2 | @ New York Americans (1927–28) | 8–5–4 |
| 18 | T | January 3, 1928 | 0–0 OT | Pittsburgh Pirates (1927–28) | 8–5–5 |
| 19 | L | January 7, 1928 | 1–4 | @ Montreal Maroons (1927–28) | 8–6–5 |
| 20 | W | January 10, 1928 | 3–1 | Chicago Black Hawks (1927–28) | 9–6–5 |
| 21 | T | January 12, 1928 | 2–2 OT | @ New York Rangers (1927–28) | 9–6–6 |
| 22 | W | January 14, 1928 | 4–2 | @ Ottawa Senators (1927–28) | 10–6–6 |
| 23 | L | January 17, 1928 | 1–3 | Montreal Canadiens (1927–28) | 10–7–6 |
| 24 | T | January 21, 1928 | 1–1 OT | @ Chicago Black Hawks (1927–28) | 10–7–7 |
| 25 | L | January 22, 1928 | 2–3 OT | @ Detroit Cougars (1927–28) | 10–8–7 |
| 26 | T | January 24, 1928 | 0–0 OT | Pittsburgh Pirates (1927–28) | 10–8–8 |
| 27 | L | January 28, 1928 | 0–1 | @ Pittsburgh Pirates (1927–28) | 10–9–8 |
| 28 | W | January 31, 1928 | 2–1 | New York Americans (1927–28) | 11–9–8 |

February

| Game | Result | Date | Score | Opponent | Record |
|---|---|---|---|---|---|
| 29 | W | February 7, 1928 | 4–2 | Detroit Cougars (1927–28) | 12–9–8 |
| 30 | T | February 11, 1928 | 1–1 OT | @ Montreal Canadiens (1927–28) | 12–9–9 |
| 31 | W | February 14, 1928 | 1–0 | Chicago Black Hawks (1927–28) | 13–9–9 |
| 32 | W | February 19, 1928 | 2–0 | @ New York Rangers (1927–28) | 14–9–9 |
| 33 | W | February 21, 1928 | 2–0 | Pittsburgh Pirates (1927–28) | 15–9–9 |
| 34 | L | February 25, 1928 | 1–3 | @ Montreal Maroons (1927–28) | 15–10–9 |
| 35 | W | February 28, 1928 | 2–1 | Montreal Maroons (1927–28) | 16–10–9 |

March

| Game | Result | Date | Score | Opponent | Record |
|---|---|---|---|---|---|
| 36 | T | March 3, 1928 | 0–0 OT | @ Toronto Maple Leafs (1927–28) | 16–10–10 |
| 37 | W | March 6, 1928 | 1–0 | Ottawa Senators (1927–28) | 17–10–10 |
| 38 | T | March 10, 1928 | 3–3 OT | New York Rangers (1927–28) | 17–10–11 |
| 39 | W | March 11, 1928 | 1–0 | @ New York Americans (1927–28) | 18–10–11 |
| 40 | W | March 13, 1928 | 3–0 | Detroit Cougars (1927–28) | 19–10–11 |
| 41 | W | March 15, 1928 | 3–1 | @ Chicago Black Hawks (1927–28) | 20–10–11 |
| 42 | L | March 17, 1928 | 1–3 | @ Pittsburgh Pirates (1927–28) | 20–11–11 |
| 43 | L | March 20, 1928 | 2–6 | Toronto Maple Leafs (1927–28) | 20–12–11 |
| 44 | L | March 24, 1928 | 2–7 | @ Detroit Cougars (1927–28) | 20–13–11 |

Legend: Win (2 points) Loss (0 points) Tie (1 point)

== Playoffs ==
The Bruins gained a first-round bye by virtue of winning the division, and played the New York Rangers in the second round in a two-game, total goal series. Their scoring problems of the regular season continued, exacerbated by a flu bug going through the dressing room and various minor injuries; Shore, Clapper, Gainor and Connor were particularly affected.

Boston tied the first game 1–1 in New York, the Rangers' final home game of the playoffs – this was the first of perennial disruptions to the Rangers' playoff schedule due to Madison Square Garden hosting the circus in the spring. The Bruins lost the second match in Boston 4–1, on three Ranger third-period goals as the weakened Brown-and-Gold folded at last, to drop the total-goal series five goals to two. Harry Oliver, who scored a goal in each game, was the sole offensive threat.

== Player statistics ==
=== Regular season ===
Scoring

| Player | Pos | GP | G | A | Pts | PIM |
|---|---|---|---|---|---|---|
| Harry Oliver | RW | 43 | 13 | 5 | 18 | 20 |
| Eddie Shore | D | 43 | 11 | 6 | 17 | 165 |
| Frank Fredrickson | C | 41 | 10 | 4 | 14 | 83 |
| Dutch Gainor | C | 42 | 8 | 4 | 12 | 35 |
| Jimmy Herbert | C/RW | 12 | 8 | 3 | 11 | 22 |
| Percy Galbraith | LW/D | 42 | 6 | 5 | 11 | 26 |
| Harry Connor | LW | 42 | 9 | 1 | 10 | 36 |
| Lionel Hitchman | D | 44 | 5 | 3 | 8 | 87 |
| Dit Clapper | RW/D | 40 | 4 | 1 | 5 | 20 |
| Fred Gordon | RW | 43 | 3 | 2 | 5 | 40 |
| Sprague Cleghorn | D | 37 | 2 | 2 | 4 | 14 |
| Hago Harrington | LW | 22 | 1 | 0 | 1 | 7 |
| Nobby Clark | D | 5 | 0 | 0 | 0 | 0 |
| Martin Lauder | D/C | 3 | 0 | 0 | 0 | 2 |
| Hal Winkler | G | 44 | 0 | 0 | 0 | 0 |

Goaltending

| Player | MIN | GP | W | L | T | GA | GAA | SO |
|---|---|---|---|---|---|---|---|---|
| Hal Winkler | 2780 | 44 | 20 | 13 | 11 | 70 | 1.51 | 15 |
| Team: | 2780 | 44 | 20 | 13 | 11 | 70 | 1.51 | 15 |

=== Playoffs ===
Scoring

| Player | Pos | GP | G | A | Pts | PIM |
|---|---|---|---|---|---|---|
| Harry Oliver | RW | 2 | 2 | 0 | 2 | 4 |
| Frank Fredrickson | C | 2 | 0 | 1 | 1 | 4 |
| Percy Galbraith | LW/D | 2 | 0 | 1 | 1 | 6 |
| Dit Clapper | RW/D | 2 | 0 | 0 | 0 | 2 |
| Sprague Cleghorn | D | 2 | 0 | 0 | 0 | 0 |
| Harry Connor | LW | 2 | 0 | 0 | 0 | 0 |
| Dutch Gainor | C | 2 | 0 | 0 | 0 | 6 |
| Fred Gordon | RW | 2 | 0 | 0 | 0 | 0 |
| Hago Harrington | LW | 2 | 0 | 0 | 0 | 0 |
| Lionel Hitchman | D | 2 | 0 | 0 | 0 | 2 |
| Eddie Shore | D | 2 | 0 | 0 | 0 | 8 |
| Hal Winkler | G | 2 | 0 | 0 | 0 | 0 |

Goaltending

| Player | MIN | GP | W | L | GA | GAA | SO |
|---|---|---|---|---|---|---|---|
| Hal Winkler | 120 | 2 | 0 | 1 | 5 | 2.50 | 0 |
| Team: | 120 | 2 | 0 | 1 | 5 | 2.50 | 0 |

Note:

Pos = Position;GP = Games played; G = Goals; A = Assists; Pts = Points; PIM = Penalty minutes; +/- = Plus/minus; PPG = Power-play goals; SHG = Short-handed goals; GWG = Game-winning goals
Pos = Position;GP = Games played; Min, TOI = Minutes played; W = Wins; L = Losses; T,T/OT = Ties; OTL = Overtime losses; GA = Goals-against; GAA = Goals-against average; SO = Shutouts; SA = Shots against; SV = Shots saved;SV% = Save percentage;

== Transactions ==
- Acquired Dutch Gainor from Minneapolis of the American Hockey Association for Red Stuart, cash and future considerations, October 24, 1927.
- Purchased Dit Clapper from Boston of the Canadian–American League, October 25, 1927.
- Sold the rights to Duke Keats to Chicago, Carson Cooper to Detroit and Billy Boucher to the Americans.
- Traded Jimmy Herbert to Toronto for the rights to Eric Pettinger and $15,000, December 21, 1927.

== See also ==
- 1927–28 NHL season
