= 1927–28 Pittsburgh Pirates (NHL) season =

National Hockey League team season

1927–28 Pittsburgh Pirates
- Division: 3rd American
- 1927–28 record: 19–17–8
- Home record: 10–9–3
- Road record: 9–8–5
- Goals for: 67
- Goals against: 76

Team information
- Coach: Odie Cleghorn
- Captain: Harold Cotton
- Arena: Duquesne Garden

Team leaders
- Goals: Hib Milks (18)
- Assists: Bert McCaffrey (4)
- Points: Hib Milks (21)
- Penalty minutes: Duke McCurry (62)
- Wins: Roy Worters (19)
- Goals against average: Roy Worters (1.66)

The 1927–28 Pittsburgh Pirates season was the third season of the Pirates ice hockey team in the National Hockey League (NHL).

== Regular season ==
=== Final standings ===
American Division
	GP	W	L	T	GF	GA	PIM	Pts
Boston Bruins	44	20	13	11	77	70	558	51
New York Rangers	44	19	16	9	94	79	462	47
Pittsburgh Pirates	44	19	17	8	67	76	395	46
Detroit Cougars	44	19	19	6	88	79	395	44
Chicago Black Hawks	44	7	34	3	68	134	375	17

=== Record vs. opponents ===
==== Vs. American Division ====
1927–28 NHL records
Team	BOS	CHI	DET	NYR	PIT	Total
Boston	—	4–0–2	4–2	2–1–3	1–2–3	11–5–8
Chicago	0–4–2	—	2–3–1	2–4	1–5	5–16–3
Detroit	2–4	3–2–1	—	2–3–1	3–2–1	10–11–3
N.Y. Rangers	1–2–3	4–2	3–2–1	—	3–2–1	11–8–5
Pittsburgh	2–1–3	5–1	2–3–1	2–3–1	—	11–8–5

==== Vs. Canadian Division ====
1927–28 NHL records
Team	MTL	MTM	NYA	OTT	TOR	Total
Boston	0–2–2	2–2	3–1	3–1	1–2–1	9–8–3
Chicago	0–4	1–3	1–3	0–4	0–4	2–18–0
Detroit	2–2	3–1	2–0–2	0–3–1	2–2	9–8–3
N.Y. Rangers	0–4	1–2–1	3–0–1	2–0–2	2–2	8–8–4
Pittsburgh	1–2–1	2–2	1–2–1	1–2–1	3–1	8–9–3

== Schedule and results ==
1927–28 regular season
November

Game	Result	Date	Score	Opponent	Record
1	L	November 15, 1927	0–6	Detroit Cougars (1927–28)	0–1–0
2	L	November 19, 1927	1–3	@ Ottawa Senators (1927–28)	0–2–0
3	L	November 22, 1927	0–4	@ Montreal Canadiens (1927–28)	0–3–0
4	L	November 26, 1927	1–2 OT	Toronto Maple Leafs (1927–28)	0–4–0
5	L	November 29, 1927	0–1	@ New York Americans (1927–28)	0–5–0

December

Game	Result	Date	Score	Opponent	Record
6	T	December 1, 1927	0–0 OT	Boston Bruins (1927–28)	0–5–1
7	T	December 6, 1927	2–2 OT	New York Rangers (1927–28)	0–5–2
8	L	December 10, 1927	0–2	New York Americans (1927–28)	0–6–2
9	L	December 17, 1927	2–5	Chicago Black Hawks (1927–28)	0–7–2
10	T	December 18, 1927	3–3 OT	@ Detroit Cougars (1927–28)	0–7–3
11	L	December 20, 1927	0–2	@ New York Rangers (1927–28)	0–8–3
12	W	December 22, 1927	3–2 OT	@ Toronto Maple Leafs (1927–28)	1–8–3
13	T	December 24, 1927	2–2 OT	Montreal Canadiens (1927–28)	1–8–4
14	W	December 31, 1927	4–0	Montreal Maroons (1927–28)	2–8–4

January

Game	Result	Date	Score	Opponent	Record
15	T	January 3, 1928	0–0 OT	@ Boston Bruins (1927–28)	2–8–5
16	T	January 5, 1928	0–0 OT	@ New York Americans (1927–28)	2–8–6
17	L	January 7, 1928	0–2	Detroit Cougars (1927–28)	2–9–6
18	W	January 12, 1928	2–0	Chicago Black Hawks (1927–28)	3–9–6
19	L	January 14, 1928	0–4	@ Montreal Maroons (1927–28)	3–10–6
20	W	January 16, 1928	2–1	@ Chicago Black Hawks (1927–28)	4–10–6
21	W	January 19, 1928	3–1	Ottawa Senators (1927–28)	5–10–6
22	L	January 22, 1928	1–4	@ New York Rangers (1927–28)	5–11–6
23	T	January 24, 1928	0–0 OT	@ Boston Bruins (1927–28)	5–11–7
24	W	January 28, 1928	1–0	Boston Bruins (1927–28)	6–11–7
25	W	January 31, 1928	2–1	@ Montreal Canadiens (1927–28)	7–11–7

February

Game	Result	Date	Score	Opponent	Record
26	W	February 4, 1928	4–2	New York Rangers (1927–28)	8–11–7
27	W	February 8, 1928	2–1	@ Chicago Black Hawks (1927–28)	9–11–7
28	L	February 11, 1928	1–3	Montreal Maroons (1927–28)	9–12–7
29	W	February 12, 1928	1–0	@ Detroit Cougars (1927–28)	10–12–7
30	W	February 14, 1928	4–2	@ Toronto Maple Leafs (1927–28)	11–12–7
31	T	February 16, 1928	0–0 OT	@ Ottawa Senators (1927–28)	11–12–8
32	W	February 18, 1928	2–0	New York Americans (1927–28)	12–12–8
33	L	February 21, 1928	0–2	@ Boston Bruins (1927–28)	12–13–8
34	L	February 23, 1928	0–3	@ New York Rangers (1927–28)	12–14–8
35	L	February 25, 1928	0–2	Ottawa Senators (1927–28)	12–15–8

March

Game	Result	Date	Score	Opponent	Record
36	W	March 1, 1928	4–2	Toronto Maple Leafs (1927–28)	13–15–8
37	L	March 3, 1928	2–3	Detroit Cougars (1927–28)	13–16–8
38	L	March 6, 1928	1–2	Montreal Canadiens (1927–28)	13–17–8
39	W	March 10, 1928	5–2	Chicago Black Hawks (1927–28)	14–17–8
40	W	March 12, 1928	2–1	@ Chicago Black Hawks (1927–28)	15–17–8
41	W	March 17, 1928	3–1	Boston Bruins (1927–28)	16–17–8
42	W	March 18, 1928	1–0	@ Detroit Cougars (1927–28)	17–17–8
43	W	March 22, 1928	2–1	@ Montreal Maroons (1927–28)	18–17–8
44	W	March 24, 1928	4–2	New York Rangers (1927–28)	19–17–8

Legend: Win (2 points) Loss (0 points) Tie (1 point)

== Playoffs ==
They made it into the playoffs. They went against the Rangers in the first round and lost 6 goals to 4, or 4–6

== Player statistics ==
=== Regular season ===
Scoring

Player	Pos	GP	G	A	Pts	PIM
Hib Milks	LW/C	44	18	3	21	32
Harold Darragh	LW	44	13	2	15	16
Baldy Cotton	LW	42	9	3	12	40
Herb Drury	D/RW	44	6	4	10	44
Bert McCaffrey	RW/D	35	6	3	9	14
Duke McCurry	LW	44	5	3	8	60
Tex White	RW	44	5	1	6	54
Johnny McKinnon	D	43	3	3	6	71
Marty Burke	D	35	2	1	3	51
Rodger Smith	D	43	1	0	1	30
Ty Arbour	LW	7	0	0	0	0
Odie Cleghorn	RW/C	2	0	0	0	4
Charlie Langlois	RW/D	8	0	0	0	8
Mickey McGuire	LW	4	0	0	0	0
Sam Rothschild	LW	12	0	0	0	0
Roy Worters	G	44	0	0	0	0

Goaltending

Player	MIN	GP	W	L	T	GA	GAA	SO
Roy Worters	2740	44	19	17	8	76	1.66	11
Team:	2740	44	19	17	8	76	1.66	11

=== Playoffs ===
Scoring

Player	Pos	GP	G	A	Pts	PIM
Rodger Smith	D	2	2	0	2	0
Baldy Cotton	LW	2	1	1	2	2
Marty Burke	D	2	1	0	1	2
Harold Darragh	LW	2	0	1	1	0
Herb Drury	D/RW	2	0	1	1	0
Duke McCurry	LW	2	0	0	0	0
Johnny McKinnon	D	2	0	0	0	4
Hib Milks	LW/C	2	0	0	0	2
Tex White	RW	2	0	0	0	2
Roy Worters	G	2	0	0	0	0

Goaltending

Player	MIN	GP	W	L	GA	GAA	SO
Roy Worters	120	2	1	1	6	3.00	0
Team:	120	2	1	1	6	3.00	0

Note: GP = Games played; G = Goals; A = Assists; Pts = Points; +/- = Plus/minus; PIM = Penalty minutes; PPG=Power-play goals; SHG=Short-handed goals; GWG=Game-winning goals
MIN=Minutes played; W = Wins; L = Losses; T = Ties; GA = Goals against; GAA = Goals against average; SO = Shutouts;

== See also ==
- 1927–28 NHL season
