= Nobby Clark (ice hockey) =

Canadian ice hockey player

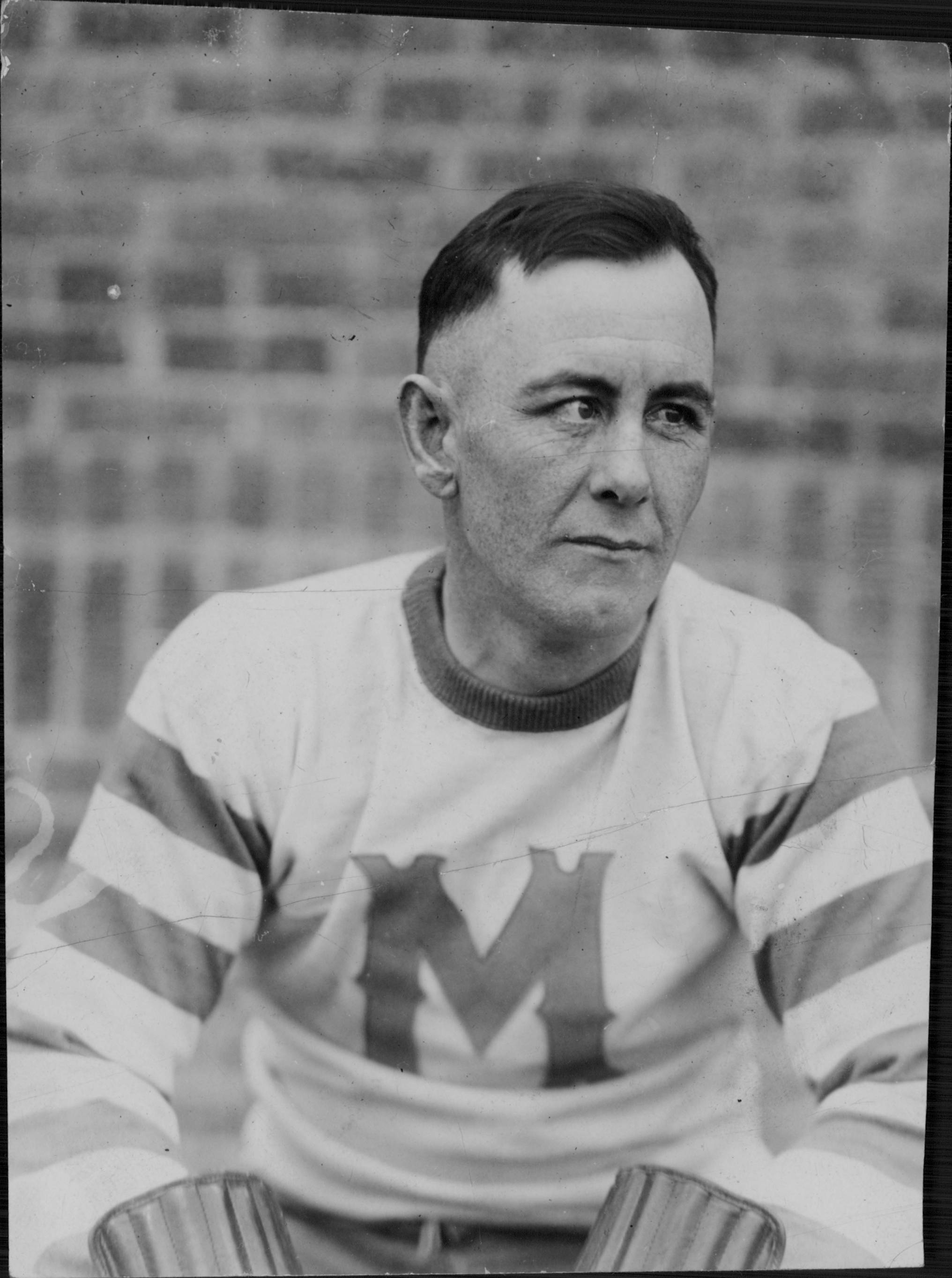
- Born: June 18, 1897; Orillia, Ontario, Canada
- Died: August 5, 1966 (aged 69)
- Height: 6 ft 1 in (185 cm)
- Weight: 190 lb (86 kg; 13 st 8 lb)
- Position: Defence
- Shot: Right
- Played for: Boston Bruins
- Playing career: 1925–1933

Patrick Joseph "Nobby" Clark (June 18, 1897 – August 5, 1966) was a Canadian professional ice hockey defenceman, most notably for the Boston Bruins of the National Hockey League, for whom he played five games in the 1927–28 season. He was born in Orillia, Ontario.

== Career statistics ==
=== Regular season and playoffs ===
			Regular season					Playoffs
Season	Team	League	GP	G	A	Pts	PIM	GP	G	A	Pts	PIM
1920–21	Eveleth Reds	USAHA	—	—	—	—	—	—	—	—	—	—
1921–22	Eveleth Reds	USAHA	—	—	—	—	—	—	—	—	—	—
1922–23	Duluth Hornets	USAHA	19	6	0	6	—	—	—	—	—	—
1923–24	Eveleth Reds	USAHA	11	1	0	1	—	—	—	—	—	—
1924–25	Eveleth Arrowheads	USAHA	38	6	0	6	—	4	0	0	0	—
1925–26	Eveleth-Hibbing Rangers	CHL	38	9	3	12	26	—	—	—	—	—
1926–27	Minneapolis Millers	AHA	36	7	5	12	46	6	0	0	0	4
1927–28	Boston Bruins	NHL	5	0	0	0	0	—	—	—	—	—
1927–28	New Haven Eagles	Can-Am	40	6	2	8	35	—	—	—	—	—
1928–29	Philadelphia Arrows	Can-Am	37	4	7	11	54	—	—	—	—	—
1929–30	St. Louis Flyers	AHA	40	6	1	7	36	—	—	—	—	—
1930–31	St. Louis Flyers	AHA	39	4	2	6	28	—	—	—	—	—
1932–33	Hibbing Maroons	CHL	12	1	6	7	4	—	—	—	—	—
AHA totals			115	17	8	25	110	6	0	0	0	4
NHL totals			5	0	0	0	0	—	—	—	—	—
