= Clarence Boucher =

Canadian ice hockey player

- Born: November 1, 1897; North Bay, Ontario, Canada
- Died: March 23, 1970 (aged 72)
- Height: 6 ft 1 in (185 cm)
- Weight: 195 lb (88 kg; 13 st 13 lb)
- Position: Defence
- Shot: Left
- Played for: New York Americans
- Playing career: 1919–1929

Clarence Alexander Boucher (November 1, 1897 — March 23, 1970) was a Canadian ice hockey defenceman who played in the National Hockey League for the New York Americans between 1926 and 1928. The rest of his career, which lasted from 1919 to 1929, was spent in various minor leagues.

== Career statistics ==
=== Regular season and playoffs ===
			Regular season					Playoffs
Season	Team	League	GP	G	A	Pts	PIM	GP	G	A	Pts	PIM
1919–20	Sudbury Cub Wolves	NOJHA	—	—	—	—	—	—	—	—	—	—
1919–20	Sudbury Wolves	NOHA	6	3	1	4	6	7	1	2	3	20
1920–21	Cleveland Indians	USAHA	—	—	—	—	—	—	—	—	—	—
1920–21	Sudbury Wolves	NOHA	9	7	3	10	40	—	—	—	—	—
1921–22	Sudbury Wolves	NOHA	9	9	5	14	39	—	—	—	—	—
1922–23	Iroquois Falls Papermakes	NOHA	—	—	—	—	—	—	—	—	—	—
1923–24	Iroquois Falls Papermakes	NOHA	8	0	0	0	22	—	—	—	—	—
1924–25	Sudbury Wolves	NOHA	—	—	—	—	—	—	—	—	—	—
1925–26	Galt Terriers	OHA Sr	16	4	3	7	37	2	0	1	1	2
1926–27	New York Americans	NHL	11	0	1	1	6	—	—	—	—	—
1926–27	Niagara Falls Cataracts	Can Pro	12	4	0	4	27	—	—	—	—	—
1927–28	New York Americans	NHL	36	2	2	4	131	—	—	—	—	—
1927–28	Niagara Falls Cataracts	Can Pro	10	1	1	2	17	—	—	—	—	—
1928–29	New Haven Eagles	Can-Am	40	3	2	5	79	2	0	0	0	4
NHL totals			47	2	3	5	137	—	—	—	—	—
