= Norman Himes =

Canadian ice hockey player

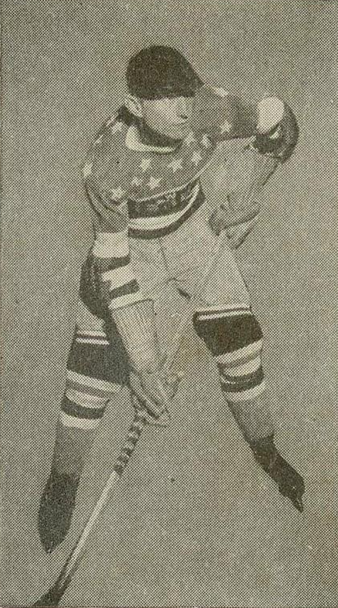
- Himes as a New York American in 1933 card
- Born: April 13, 1900 Galt, Ontario, Canada
- Died: September 14, 1958 (aged 58) Galt, Ontario, Canada
- Height: 5 ft 10 in (178 cm)
- Weight: 150 lb (68 kg; 10 st 10 lb)
- Position: Centre
- Shot: Right
- Played for: New York Americans
- Playing career: 1921–1937

Norman Lawrence Himes (April 13, 1900 — September 14, 1958) was a Canadian ice hockey player and professional golfer. Himes played all 402 games in the National Hockey League with the New York Americans between 1926 and 1935; no player played in more games for the franchise than Himes, who also holds the record for most goals (107) and points (219).

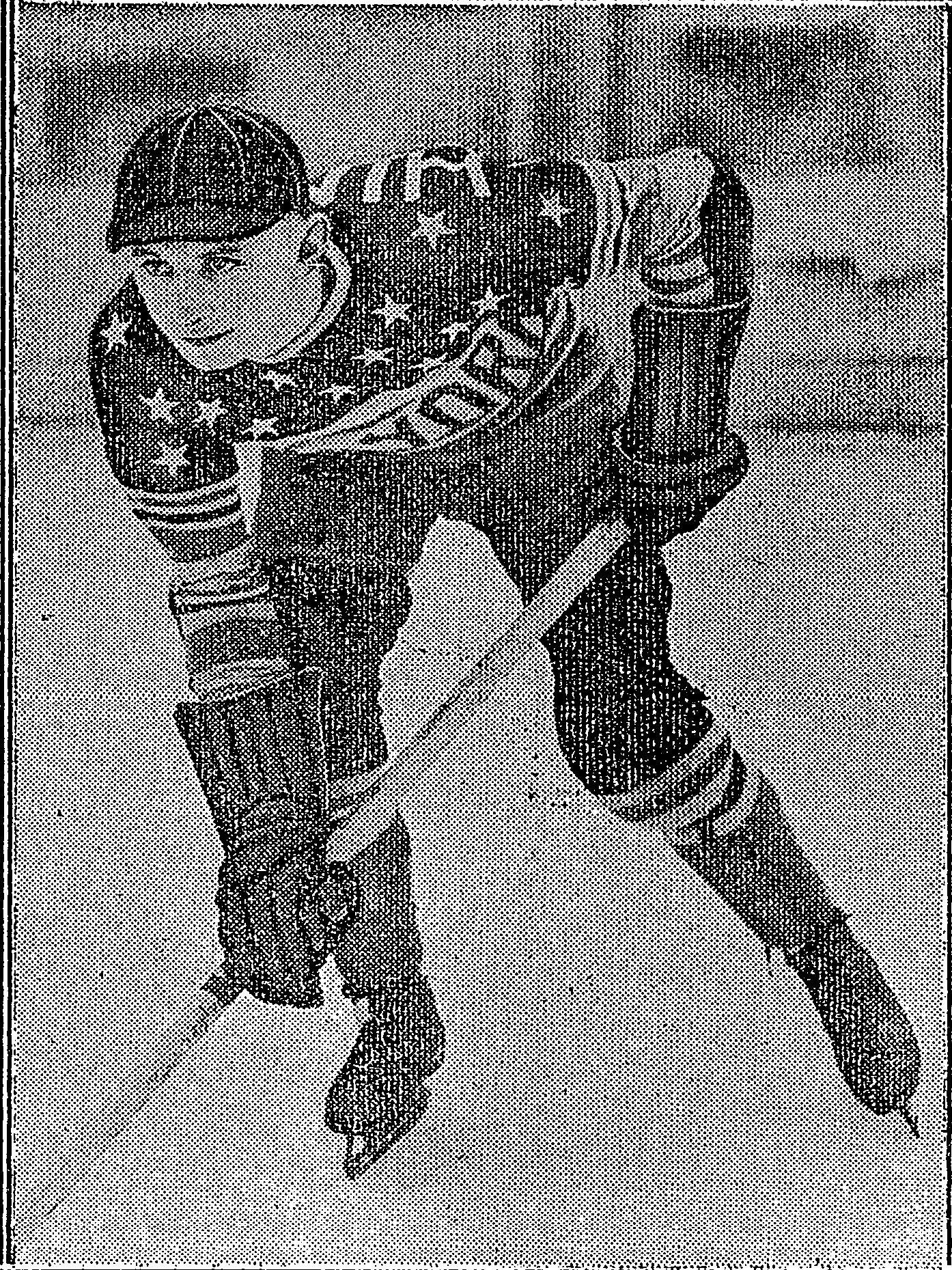
Himes as a New York American in 1928

After retiring from hockey Himes became a professional golfer, for the most part at Westmount Golf Club in Kitchener, Ontario. His biggest tournament win as a professional was the Ontario PGA Match Play for the Millar Trophy in 1951.

== Career statistics ==
=== Regular season and playoffs ===
			Regular season					Playoffs
Season	Team	League	GP	G	A	Pts	PIM	GP	G	A	Pts	PIM
1918–19	Galt Terriers	OHA	—	—	—	—	—	—	—	—	—	—
1919–20	Galt Terriers	OHA	—	—	—	—	—	—	—	—	—	—
1920–21	Galt Terriers	OHA Int	—	—	—	—	—	—	—	—	—	—
1921–22	Galt Terriers	OHA Sr	—	—	—	—	—	—	—	—	—	—
1922–23	Galt Terriers	OHA Sr	9	11	5	16	—	—	—	—	—	—
1922–23	Galt Terriers	OHA Int	12	13	4	17	4	—	—	—	—	—
1923–24	Galt Terriers	OHA Sr	12	9	3	4	6	—	—	—	—	—
1924–25	Galt Terriers	OHA Sr	20	14	3	17	19	—	—	—	—	—
1925–26	Galt Terriers	OHA Sr	20	13	6	19	13	2	2	0	2	1
1926–27	New York Americans	NHL	42	9	2	11	10	—	—	—	—	—
1927–28	New York Americans	NHL	44	14	5	19	24	—	—	—	—	—
1928–29	New York Americans	NHL	44	10	0	10	25	2	0	0	0	0
1929–30	New York Americans	NHL	44	28	22	50	15	—	—	—	—	—
1930–31	New York Americans	NHL	44	15	9	24	18	—	—	—	—	—
1931–32	New York Americans	NHL	48	7	21	28	9	—	—	—	—	—
1932–33	New York Americans	NHL	48	9	25	34	12	—	—	—	—	—
1933–34	New York Americans	NHL	48	9	16	25	10	—	—	—	—	—
1934–35	New York Americans	NHL	40	5	13	18	2	—	—	—	—	—
1935–36	New Haven Eagles	Can-Am	46	4	14	18	26	—	—	—	—	—
1936–37	New Haven Eagles	IAHL	6	0	0	0	2	—	—	—	—	—
NHL totals			402	106	113	219	125	2	0	0	0	0

== Awards ==
- 1930–1931 - NHL Most Game Winning Goals (7)
- 1933–1934 - NHL All-Star Game

== Professional golf wins ==
- 1951 Millar Trophy (Ontario PGA Match Play)
