= Hago Harrington =

American ice hockey player

- Born: October 13, 1903 Melrose, MA, USA
- Died: July 1, 1959 (aged 55)
- Height: 5 ft 8 in (173 cm)
- Weight: 163 lb (74 kg; 11 st 9 lb)
- Position: Left wing
- Shot: Left
- Played for: Montreal Canadiens; Boston Bruins
- Playing career: 1923–1936

Leland Kitteridge "Hago" Harrington (October 13, 1903 in Melrose, Massachusetts – July 1, 1959) was an American professional ice hockey forward who played 66 games in the National Hockey League for the Boston Bruins and Montreal Canadiens between 1925 and 1933.

Harrington scored his first NHL goal as a member of the Boston Bruins. It occurred on December 29, 1925, in Boston's 3–0 home victory over the Toronto St. Patricks. Harrington was the first Massachusett's born player on the Bruins to score his first NHL goal in his first NHL game.

Harrington built and opened a miniature golf course in Stoneham, Massachusetts that operated as "Hago Harrington's Miniature Golf" until closing in 2024

== Career statistics ==
=== Regular season and playoffs ===
			Regular season					Playoffs
Season	Team	League	GP	G	A	Pts	PIM	GP	G	A	Pts	PIM
1922–23	Melrose High School	HS-MA	—	—	—	—	—	—	—	—	—	—
1923–24	Boston Athletic Association	USAHA	12	9	0	9	—	5	2	0	2	—
1924–25	Boston Athletic Association	USAHA	18	14	0	14	—	4	1	0	1	—
1925–26	Boston Bruins	NHL	26	7	2	9	6	—	—	—	—	—
1926–27	New Haven Eagles	Can-Am	32	21	4	25	36	4	2	1	3	0
1927–28	Boston Bruins	NHL	22	1	0	1	7	2	0	0	0	0
1927–28	New Haven Eagles	Can-Am	16	13	5	18	22	—	—	—	—	—
1928–29	Providence Reds	Can-Am	31	5	3	8	44	6	3	0	3	14
1929–30	Providence Reds	Can-Am	37	11	6	17	51	3	1	1	2	2
1930–31	Providence Reds	Can-Am	39	8	16	24	41	2	1	0	1	2
1931–32	Providence Reds	Can-Am	39	15	20	35	44	5	3	1	4	0
1932–33	Providence Reds	Can-Am	22	11	12	23	20	—	—	—	—	—
1932–33	Montreal Canadiens	NHL	24	1	1	2	2	2	1	0	1	2
1933–34	Providence Reds	Can-Am	40	13	19	32	26	3	0	2	2	0
1934–35	Providence Reds	Can-Am	46	17	32	49	32	6	0	1	1	8
1935–36	Providence Reds	Can-Am	45	12	3	15	22	7	0	0	0	8
Can-Am totals			347	126	120	246	338	36	10	6	16	34
NHL totals			72	9	3	12	15	4	1	0	1	2
