= Samuel Rothschild =

Canadian ice hockey player

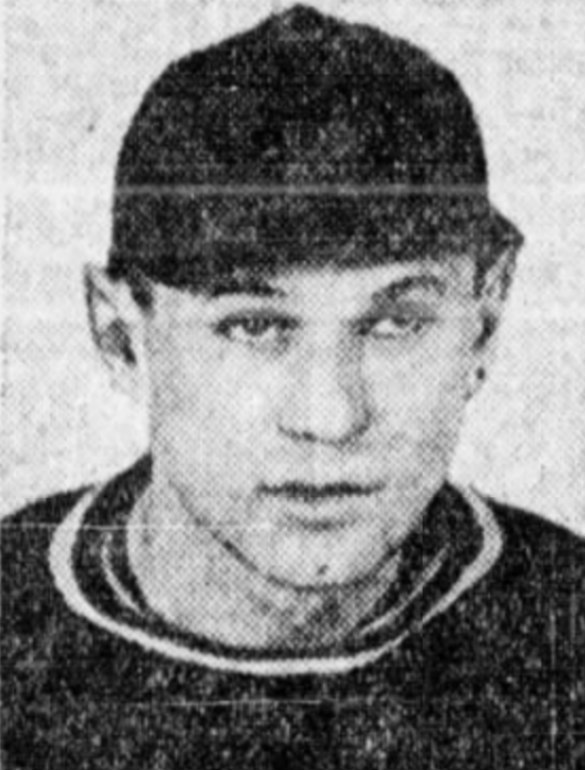
- Rothschild with the Montreal Maroons
- Born: October 16, 1899 Sudbury, Ontario, Canada
- Died: April 15, 1987 (aged 87) Sudbury, Ontario, Canada
- Height: 5 ft 6 in (168 cm)
- Weight: 145 lb (66 kg; 10 st 5 lb)
- Position: Left wing
- Shot: Left
- Played for: NHL; Montreal Maroons; Pittsburgh Pirates; New York Americans
- Playing career: 1924–1928

Samuel "Sam" Rothschild (October 16, 1899 – April 15, 1987) was a Canadian professional ice hockey player who played 102 games in the National Hockey League (NHL). Rothschild was the first Jewish player in the NHL. He played for the Montreal Maroons, Pittsburgh Pirates, and New York Americans. He was the last surviving member of the 1926 Stanley Cup champion Maroons.

== Early life ==
Rothschild was born in Sudbury, Ontario, to Daniel and Annie Rothschild, the city's first Jewish settlers. Daniel Rothschild was a merchant in the city, whose retail and office property is listed on the city's register of historic properties.

== Playing career ==
Rothschild played hockey in the Montreal area for Montreal Harmonia, McGill University, and the Montreal Stars before returning home to play for the junior Sudbury Wolves in 1919. He played the next four seasons with the senior Sudbury Wolves before joining the expansion Montreal Maroons in 1924, becoming the first Jewish player in the NHL. He played three seasons with the Maroons before being sold to the Pirates in 1927. He finished the 1927–28 season with the New York Americans after being suspended by the Pirates in December 1927. It was his last season in the NHL.

== Post-NHL career ==
Following his retirement from the NHL Rothschild took up coaching, and coached the junior Sudbury Wolves to the 1932 Memorial Cup championship. He married Eva Yackman in 1933.

He was also a prominent supporter of curling in the city, including stints as president of the Northern Ontario Curling Association and the Canadian Curling Association from 1957 to 1958, and securing the city's status as host city of the 1953 Brier. He was later inducted into the Canadian Curling Hall of Fame.

As well, he served for two years on Sudbury's city council. He died at a hospital in Sudbury on April 15, 1987.

== Career statistics ==
=== Regular season and playoffs ===
			Regular season					Playoffs
Season	Team	League	GP	G	A	Pts	PIM	GP	G	A	Pts	PIM
1915–16	Sudbury Midgets	NOHA	—	—	—	—	—	—	—	—	—	—
1916–17	Montreal Harmonia	QAAA	9	16	0	16	—	—	—	—	—	—
1917–18	Montreal 65th Regiment	MCHL	—	—	—	—	—	—	—	—	—	—
1917–18	Montreal Vickers	MCHL	—	—	—	—	—	—	—	—	—	—
1918–19	Montreal Vickers	MCHL	1	5	0	5	—	—	—	—	—	—
1918–19	Montreal Stars	MCHL	5	2	3	5	6	—	—	—	—	—
1919–20	Sudbury Cub Wolves	NOJHA	1	0	0	0	0	—	—	—	—	—
1920–21	Sudbury Wolves	NOHA	9	10	2	12	0	—	—	—	—	—
1921–22	Sudbury Wolves	NOHA	6	5	5	10	3	—	—	—	—	—
1922–23	Sudbury Wolves	NOHA	7	6	4	10	22	2	1	0	1	2
1923–24	Sudbury Wolves	NOHA	—	—	—	—	—	—	—	—	—	—
1924–25	Montreal Maroons	NHL	28	5	4	9	5	—	—	—	—	—
1925–26	Montreal Maroons	NHL	33	2	1	3	8	4	0	0	0	0
1925–26	Montreal Maroons	St-Cup	—	—	—	—	—	4	0	0	0	0
1926–27	Montreal Maroons	NHL	22	1	1	2	8	2	0	0	0	0
1927–28	Pittsburgh Pirates	NHL	12	0	0	0	0	—	—	—	—	—
1927–28	New York Americans	NHL	5	0	0	0	4	—	—	—	—	—
NHL totals			100	8	6	14	25	6	0	0	0	0

== See also ==
- List of select Jewish ice hockey players
