= 1927–28 Detroit Cougars season =

American hockey team season

1927–28 Detroit Cougars
- Division: 4th American
- 1927–28 record: 19–19–6
- Home record: 9–10–3
- Road record: 10–9–3
- Goals for: 88
- Goals against: 79

Team information
- General manager: Jack Adams
- Coach: Jack Adams (33 games); Duke Keats (11 games)
- Captain: Reg Noble
- Arena: Detroit Olympia
- Average attendance: 15,000

Team leaders
- Goals: George Hay (22)
- Assists: George Hay (13)
- Points: George Hay (35)
- Penalty minutes: Percy Traub (78)
- Wins: Hap Holmes (19)
- Goals against average: Hap Holmes (1.73)

The 1927–28 Detroit Cougars season was the second season of the Detroit, Michigan National Hockey League (NHL) franchise later known as the Detroit Red Wings. The Detroit Cougars scored 44 points, finishing fourth in the American Division and failing to make the playoffs in their sophomore year.

The Cougars finally moved into what would be their home for the next fifty years, Detroit's Olympia Stadium. Their also received a new coach and general manager in Jack Adams. Adams made an immediate impact, picking up Reg Noble and quickly naming him Captain. Detroit performed much better to start off the season and only finished two points out of a playoff spot.

== Regular season ==
=== Season standings ===
American Division
	GP	W	L	T	GF	GA	PIM	Pts
**Boston Bruins**	44	20	13	11	77	70	558	51
**New York Rangers**	44	19	16	9	94	79	462	47
**Pittsburgh Pirates**	44	19	17	8	67	76	395	46
Detroit Cougars	44	19	19	6	88	79	395	44
Chicago Black Hawks	44	7	34	3	68	134	375	17

Note: GP = Games Played, W = Wins, L = Losses, T = Ties, Pts = Points, GF = Goals For, GA = Goals Against
Teams that qualified for the playoffs are highlighted in bold.

=== Record vs. opponents ===
==== Vs. American Division ====
1927–28 NHL records
Team	**BOS**	**CHI**	**DET**	**NYR**	**PIT**	**Total**
Boston	—	4–0–2	4–2	2–1–3	1–2–3	**11–5–8**
Chicago	0–4–2	—	2–3–1	2–4	1–5	**5–16–3**
Detroit	2–4	3–2–1	—	2–3–1	3–2–1	**10–11–3**
N.Y. Rangers	1–2–3	4–2	3–2–1	—	3–2–1	**11–8–5**
Pittsburgh	2–1–3	5–1	2–3–1	2–3–1	—	**11–8–5**

==== Vs. Canadian Division ====
1927–28 NHL records
Team	**MTL**	**MTM**	**NYA**	**OTT**	**TOR**	**Total**
Boston	0–2–2	2–2	3–1	3–1	1–2–1	**9–8–3**
Chicago	0–4	1–3	1–3	0–4	0–4	**2–18–0**
Detroit	2–2	3–1	2–0–2	0–3–1	2–2	**9–8–3**
N.Y. Rangers	0–4	1–2–1	3–0–1	2–0–2	2–2	**8–8–4**
Pittsburgh	1–2–1	2–2	1–2–1	1–2–1	3–1	**8–9–3**

== Schedule and results ==
1927–28 regular season
November: 2–2–1 (home: 1–1–0; road: 1–1–1)

Game	Date	Visitor	Score	Home	OT	Record	Pts
1	November 15	Detroit	6–0	Pittsburgh		1–0–0	2
2	November 19	Detroit	2–5	Boston		1–1–0	2
3	November 22	Ottawa	2–1	Detroit		1–2–0	2
4	November 26	Detroit	0–0	Chicago	OT	1–2–1	3
5	November 27	Mtl. Canadiens	0–2	Detroit		2–2–1	5

December: 6–4–2 (home: 3–2–1; road: 3–2–1)

Game	Date	Visitor	Score	Home	OT	Record	Pts
6	December 1	Chicago	1–3	Detroit		3–2–1	7
7	December 4	NY Rangers	3–1	Detroit		3–3–1	7
8	December 8	NY Americans	1–2	Detroit		4–3–1	9
9	December 10	Detroit	4–1	Mtl. Maroons		5–3–1	11
10	December 11	Boston	2–1	Detroit	OT	5–4–1	11
11	December 13	Detroit	1–6	Mtl. Canadiens		5–5–1	11
12	December 15	Detroit	2–1	NY Rangers		6–5–1	13
13	December 17	Detroit	1–0	Toronto	OT	7–5–1	15
14	December 18	Pittsburgh	3–3	Detroit	OT	7–5–2	16
15	December 27	Detroit	4–4	NY Americans	OT	7–5–3	17
16	December 29	Mtl. Maroons	0–3	Detroit		8–5–3	19
17	December 31	Detroit	2–6	Ottawa		8–6–3	19

January: 4–5–0 (home: 2–3–0; road: 2–2–0)

Game	Date	Visitor	Score	Home	OT	Record	Pts
18	January 3	Detroit	4–2	NY Rangers		9–6–3	21
19	January 5	Mtl. Canadiens	2–1	Detroit		9–7–3	21
20	January 7	Detroit	2–0	Pittsburgh		10–7–3	23
21	January 12	Toronto	2–1	Detroit		10–8–3	23
22	January 15	NY Rangers	2–1	Detroit		10–9–3	23
23	January 18	Detroit	0–2	Chicago		10–10–3	23
24	January 22	Boston	2–3	Detroit	OT	11–10–3	25
25	January 26	Detroit	0–3	NY Rangers		11–11–3	25
26	January 29	Chicago	2–4	Detroit		12–11–3	27

February: 1–4–3 (home: 0–2–2; road: 1–2–1)

Game	Date	Visitor	Score	Home	OT	Record	Pts
27	February 4	Detroit	0–2	Toronto		12–12–3	27
28	February 7	Detroit	2–4	Boston		12–13–3	27
29	February 9	Detroit	2–2	NY Americans	OT	12–13–4	28
30	February 12	Pittsburgh	1–0	Detroit		12–14–4	28
31	February 16	Detroit	1–0	Mtl. Maroons		13–14–4	30
32	February 19	Chicago	2–1	Detroit		13–15–4	30
33	February 23	Ottawa	0–0	Detroit	OT	13–15–5	31
34	February 26	NY Rangers	0–0	Detroit	OT	13–15–6	32

March: 6–4–0 (home: 3–2–0; road: 3–2–0)

Game	Date	Visitor	Score	Home	OT	Record	Pts
35	March 1	NY Americans	1–4	Detroit		14–15–6	34
36	March 3	Detroit	3–2	Pittsburgh		15–15–6	36
37	March 6	Toronto	1–3	Detroit		16–15–6	38
38	March 8	Mtl. Maroons	2–3	Detroit	OT	16–16–6	38
39	March 10	Detroit	1–3	Ottawa		16–17–6	38
40	March 13	Detroit	0–3	Boston		16–18–6	38
41	March 15	Detroit	1–0	Mtl. Canadiens		17–18–6	40
42	March 17	Detroit	7–0	Chicago		18–18–6	42
43	March 18	Pittsburgh	0–1	Detroit		18–19–6	42
44	March 24	Boston	2–7	Detroit		19–19–6	44

Legend: Win (2 points) Loss (0 points) Tie (1 point)

== Player statistics ==
=== Skaters ===
Note: GP = Games played; G = Goals; A = Assists; Pts = Points; +/- = Plus/minus; PIM = Penalty minutes

		Regular season					Playoffs
Player	Pos	GP	G	A	Pts	PIM	GP	G	A	Pts	PIM
George Hay	LW	42	22	13	35	20	–	–	–	–	–
John Sheppard	F	43	10	10	20	40	–	–	–	–	–
Carson Cooper	RW	44	15	2	17	32	–	–	–	–	–
Larry Aurie	RW	44	13	3	16	43	–	--	–	–	–
Reg Noble	F	44	6	8	14	63	–	–	–	–	–
Frank Foyston	C	24	7	2	9	16	–	–	–	–	–
Jack Walker	F	39	2	4	6	12	–	–	–	–	–
Gord Fraser*	D	30	3	1	4	50	–	–	–	–	–
Percy Traub	D	44	3	1	4	78	–	–	–	–	–
Pete Palangio	LW	13	3	0	3	8	–	–	–	–	–
Clem Loughlin	D	42	1	2	3	21	–	–	–	–	–
Stan Brown	D	24	2	0	2	4	–	–	–	–	–
Frank Sheppard	F	4	1	1	2	0	–	–	–	–	–
Gordon "Duke" Keats*	C	5	0	2	2	6	–	–	–	–	–

*Stats reflect games played with Detroit only.

=== Goaltending ===
Note: GP = Games played; TOI = Time on ice (minutes); W = Wins; L = Losses; OTL = Overtime losses; GA = Goals against; SO = Shutouts; SV% = Save percentage; GAA = Goals against average

	Regular season								Playoffs
Player	GP	TOI	W	L	T	GA	SO	GAA	GP	TOI	W	L	GA	SO	GAA
Hap Holmes	44	2740	19	19	6	79	11	1.73	–	–	–	–	–	–	–

== Transactions ==
The Cougars were involved in the following transactions during the 1926–27 season.

=== Trades ===
April 11, 1927	To Detroit Cougars George Hay; Percy Traub	To Chicago Black Hawks US$15,000
May 22, 1927	To Detroit Cougars Carson Cooper	To Boston Bruins Cash
May 22, 1927	To Detroit Cougars Harry Meeking	To Boston Bruins Fred Gordon
October 4, 1927	To Detroit Cougars Reg Noble	To Montreal Maroons 7,500 USD
October 10, 1927	To Detroit Cougars Stan Brown	To New York Rangers Archie Briden; Harry Meeking
December 16, 1927	To Detroit Cougars Gord Fraser	To Chicago Black Hawks Gordon "Duke" Keats; 5,000 USD
February 13, 1928	To Detroit Cougars Pete Palangio; Cash	To Montreal Canadiens Stan Brown

=== Free agents ===
Player signed	Former team
F Frank Sheppard	Detroit Greyhounds (AHA)
RW Larry Aurie	London Panthers (Can-pro)

== See also ==
- 1927–28 NHL season
