= 1927–28 Chicago Black Hawks season =

NHL ice hockey team season

1927–28 Chicago Black Hawks
- Division: 5th American
- 1927–28 record: 7–34–3
- Home record: 2–18–2
- Road record: 5–16–1
- Goals for: 68
- Goals against: 134

Team information
- General manager: Frederic McLaughlin
- Coach: Barney Stanley (4–17–2); Hugh Lehman (3–17–1)
- Captain: Dick Irvin
- Arena: Chicago Coliseum

Team leaders
- Goals: Mickey MacKay (17)
- Assists: Duke Keats (8)
- Points: Duke Keats (22)
- Penalty minutes: Duke Keats (55)
- Wins: Chuck Gardiner (6)
- Goals against average: Chuck Gardiner (2.83)

The 1927–28 Chicago Black Hawks season was the team's second season of play.

== Regular season ==
The team was coming off a 19–22–3 expansion season, however, team owner Frederic McLaughlin saw it as a disappointment, and fired head coach Pete Muldoon. He was replaced by Barney Stanley. The team would score only 68 goals, 3rd fewest in the league, and allow a league high 134, and finish with a 7–34–3 record, dead last in the NHL. Midway through the season, the Hawks fired Stanley and named Hugh Lehman, who was the backup goaltender, as the team's head coach.

Injuries played a big part in the Hawks horrible season, as Babe Dye, who scored a team high 25 goals the previous year, would suit up for only 9 games and get no points. Team captain and scoring leader from 1926 to 1927, Dick Irvin, would miss 30 games due to injuries, and as a result, goals were hard to come by. Mickey MacKay would lead the Hawks with 17 goals, while Duke Keats would have a team best 22 points and 55 penalty minutes.

In goal, rookie Chuck Gardiner would get the majority of action, playing in 40 games, winning 6 of them and posting a 2.83 GAA, along with 3 shutouts.

Chicago would miss the playoffs for the first time in the club's short history, finishing 29 points behind the Pittsburgh Pirates for the final playoff spot in the American Division.

=== November ===
The Black Hawks opened the 1927–28 season on the road against the Boston Bruins on November 15. The Black Hawks and the Bruins fought to a 1–1 tie. In their next game two nights later, the Black Hawks won their first game of the season, defeating the Montreal Maroons 3–2 in Montreal. Chicago finished their three-game road trip in Toronto, where they lost to the Toronto Maple Leafs 4–2.

On November 23, the Black Hawks hosted the defending Stanley Cup champions, the Ottawa Senators, losing a close one by a 2–1 score. Three nights later, the Black Hawks earned their first shutout of the season, as they battled to a 0–0 tie against the Detroit Cougars. Chicago ended off November with a 5–2 loss to the Montreal Canadiens.

The Black Hawks earned a 1–3–2 record in November, recording four points. The club was in fourth place in the five team American Division, five points behind the first place New York Rangers.

=== December ===
The Black Hawks winless streak reached five games, as they opened December with a 3–1 loss to the Detroit Cougars. Chicago ended their winless skid, as on December 3, the club defeated the New York Rangers 4–2, earning their first win of the season on home ice. The Black Hawks would then drop their next three games, falling to a 2–7–2 record on the season.

Chicago ended their losing streak with a 5–2 win over the Pittsburgh Pirates, however, the club would struggle for the rest of December, losing their remaining four games.

The team finished the month with a 2–8–0 record, dropping their overall win–loss record to 3–11–2, earning eight points. The Black Hawks were in a tie for last place with the Pittsburgh in the American Division at the end of December.

=== January ===
The losses continued to pile on for the Black Hawks, as they lost their first six games of the month, extending their overall losing streak to a franchise record ten games. Two of those losses were against the Pittsburgh Pirates, which dropped the Black Hawks into last place in the American Division with a 3–17–2 record.

The losing streak ended on January 18, as the Black Hawks shutout the Detroit Cougars 2–0. Following the game, the team replaced head coach Barney Stanley with Hugh Lehman, who had started the season as the Black Hawks goaltender. In his first game as head coach of the Black Hawks on January 21, the team tied the Boston Bruins 1–1.

On January 24, the Black Hawks suffered a 10–0 loss to the Montreal Canadiens, setting a team record for goals allowed in a game. The losses continued to pile up for Chicago, as they lost their remaining three games in January, including a high scoring 9–6 loss to the Ottawa Senators.

Chicago struggled to a 1–10–1 record in January, setting a team record for losses in a month. Overall, the Black Hawks had a 4–21–3 record at the end of the month, earning 11 points, and in last place in the American Division, eight points behind the fourth place Pittsburgh Pirates.

=== February ===
The Black Hawks began February off with a 6–0 victory over the New York Americans, ending their five-game winless streak. After suffering losses to the Pittsburgh Pirates and Montreal Maroons, the Black Hawks surprised the American Division leading team, the New York Rangers, with a 3–0 victory on February 12.

In their remaining five games in February, the Black Hawks posted a 1–4–0 record, with their lone victory over the Detroit Cougars on February 19.

Chicago earned a record of 3–6–0 in February. Overall, the club's win–loss record at the end of the month was 7–27–3, earning 17 points.

=== March ===
March would be a very tough month for the struggling Black Hawks, as Chicago concluded the season by losing all seven games they played in the month, which extended their overall losing streak to 10 games for the second time in the season.

March was the first time in team history that Chicago failed to earn a victory or a point, as the club had a 0–7–0 record. The team finished the season with a 7–34–3 record, earning 17 points, which was the lowest point total in the NHL.

=== Season standings ===
American Division
	GP	W	L	T	GF	GA	PIM	Pts
**Boston Bruins**	44	20	13	11	77	70	558	51
**New York Rangers**	44	19	16	9	94	79	462	47
**Pittsburgh Pirates**	44	19	17	8	67	76	395	46
Detroit Cougars	44	19	19	6	88	79	395	44
Chicago Black Hawks	44	7	34	3	68	134	375	17

Note: GP = Games Played, W = Wins, L = Losses, T = Ties, Pts = Points, GF = Goals For, GA = Goals Against
Teams that qualified for the playoffs are highlighted in bold.

=== Record vs. opponents ===
==== Vs. American Division ====
1927–28 NHL records
Team	**BOS**	**CHI**	**DET**	**NYR**	**PIT**	**Total**
Boston	—	4–0–2	4–2	2–1–3	1–2–3	**11–5–8**
Chicago	0–4–2	—	2–3–1	2–4	1–5	**5–16–3**
Detroit	2–4	3–2–1	—	2–3–1	3–2–1	**10–11–3**
N.Y. Rangers	1–2–3	4–2	3–2–1	—	3–2–1	**11–8–5**
Pittsburgh	2–1–3	5–1	2–3–1	2–3–1	—	**11–8–5**

==== Vs. Canadian Division ====
1927–28 NHL records
Team	**MTL**	**MTM**	**NYA**	**OTT**	**TOR**	**Total**
Boston	0–2–2	2–2	3–1	3–1	1–2–1	**9–8–3**
Chicago	0–4	1–3	1–3	0–4	0–4	**2–18–0**
Detroit	2–2	3–1	2–0–2	0–3–1	2–2	**9–8–3**
N.Y. Rangers	0–4	1–2–1	3–0–1	2–0–2	2–2	**8–8–4**
Pittsburgh	1–2–1	2–2	1–2–1	1–2–1	3–1	**8–9–3**

== Schedule and results ==
1927–28 regular season
November

Game	Date	Visitor	Score	Home	Record	Points
1	November 15	Chicago Black Hawks	1–1	Boston Bruins	0–0–1	1
2	November 17	Chicago Black Hawks	3–2	Montreal Maroons	1–0–1	3
3	November 19	Chicago Black Hawks	2–4	Toronto Maple Leafs	1–1–1	3
4	November 23	Ottawa Senators	2–0	Chicago Black Hawks	1–2–1	3
5	November 26	Detroit Cougars	0–0	Chicago Black Hawks	1–2–2	4
6	November 30	Montreal Canadiens	5–2	Chicago Black Hawks	1–3–2	4

December

Game	Date	Visitor	Score	Home	Record	Points
7	December 1	Chicago Black Hawks	1–3	Detroit Cougars	1–4–2	4
8	December 3	New York Rangers	2–4	Chicago Black Hawks	2–4–2	6
9	December 7	New York Americans	2–1	Chicago Black Hawks	2–5–2	6
10	December 10	Boston Bruins	2–0	Chicago Black Hawks	2–6–2	6
11	December 14	Toronto Maple Leafs	4–2	Chicago Black Hawks	2–7–2	6
12	December 17	Chicago Black Hawks	5–2	Pittsburgh Pirates	3–7–2	8
13	December 18	Chicago Black Hawks	0–2	New York Americans	3–8–2	8
14	December 22	Chicago Black Hawks	2–5	Montreal Canadiens	3–9–2	8
15	December 25	Chicago Black Hawks	0–2	New York Rangers	3–10–2	8
16	December 28	Montreal Maroons	4–3	Chicago Black Hawks	3–11–2	8

January

Game	Date	Visitor	Score	Home	Record	Points
17	January 2	Toronto Maple Leafs	4–1	Chicago Black Hawks	3–12–2	8
18	January 4	Montreal Canadiens	3–1	Chicago Black Hawks	3–13–2	8
19	January 8	Chicago Black Hawks	0–5	New York Rangers	3–14–2	8
20	January 10	Chicago Black Hawks	1–3	Boston Bruins	3–15–2	8
21	January 12	Chicago Black Hawks	0–2	Pittsburgh Pirates	3–16–2	8
22	January 16	Pittsburgh Pirates	2–1	Chicago Black Hawks	3–17–2	8
23	January 18	Detroit Cougars	0–2	Chicago Black Hawks	4–17–2	10
24	January 21	Boston Bruins	1–1	Chicago Black Hawks	4–17–3	11
25	January 24	Chicago Black Hawks	0–10	Montreal Canadiens	4–18–3	11
26	January 26	Chicago Black Hawks	6–9	Ottawa Senators	4–19–3	11
27	January 28	Chicago Black Hawks	1–4	Toronto Maple Leafs	4–20–3	11
28	January 29	Chicago Black Hawks	2–4	Detroit Cougars	4–21–3	11

February

Game	Date	Visitor	Score	Home	Record	Points
29	February 5	Chicago Black Hawks	6–0	New York Americans	5–21–3	13
30	February 8	Pittsburgh Pirates	2–1	Chicago Black Hawks	5–22–3	13
31	February 10	Montreal Maroons	3–2	Chicago Black Hawks	5–23–3	13
32	February 12	Chicago Black Hawks	3–0	New York Rangers	6–23–3	15
33	February 14	Chicago Black Hawks	0–1	Boston Bruins	6–24–3	15
34	February 19	Chicago Black Hawks	2–1	Detroit Cougars	7–24–3	17
35	February 22	Ottawa Senators	3–2	Chicago Black Hawks	7–25–3	17
36	February 25	New York Rangers	1–0	Chicago Black Hawks	7–26–3	17
37	February 28	New York Americans	2–1	Chicago Black Hawks	7–27–3	17

March

Game	Date	Visitor	Score	Home	Record	Points
38	March 1	Chicago Black Hawks	3–6	Montreal Maroons	7–28–3	17
39	March 3	Chicago Black Hawks	1–3	Ottawa Senators	7–29–3	17
40	March 10	Chicago Black Hawks	2–5	Pittsburgh Pirates	7–30–3	17
41	March 12	Pittsburgh Pirates	2–1	Chicago Black Hawks	7–31–3	17
42	March 15	Boston Bruins	3–1	Chicago Black Hawks	7–32–3	17
43	March 17	Detroit Cougars	7–0	Chicago Black Hawks	7–33–3	17
44	March 21	New York Rangers	6–1	Chicago Black Hawks	7–34–3	17

Legend: Win (2 points) Loss (0 points) Tie (1 point)

== Player statistics ==
=== Scoring leaders ===
Player	GP	G	A	Pts	PIM
Duke Keats	32	14	8	22	55
Mickey MacKay	36	17	4	21	23
Rabbit McVeigh	38	6	7	13	10
Ty Arbour	32	5	5	10	32
Cy Wentworth	44	5	5	10	31

=== Goaltending ===
Player	GP	TOI	W	L	T	GA	SO	GAA
Chuck Gardiner	40	2420	6	32	2	114	3	2.83
Hugh Lehman	4	250	1	2	1	20	1	4.80
