= 1927–28 New York Rangers season =

NHL hockey team season (won Stanley Cup)

1927–28 New York Rangers
- Stanley Cup champions
- Division: 2nd American
- 1927–28 record: 19–16–9
- Home record: 10–8–4
- Road record: 9–8–5
- Goals for: 94
- Goals against: 79

Team information
- General manager: Lester Patrick
- Coach: Lester Patrick
- Captain: Bill Cook
- Arena: Madison Square Garden

Team leaders
- Goals: Frank Boucher (23)
- Assists: Bun Cook (14)
- Points: Frank Boucher (35)
- Penalty minutes: Ching Johnson (146)
- Wins: Lorne Chabot (19)
- Goals against average: Lorne Chabot (1.74)

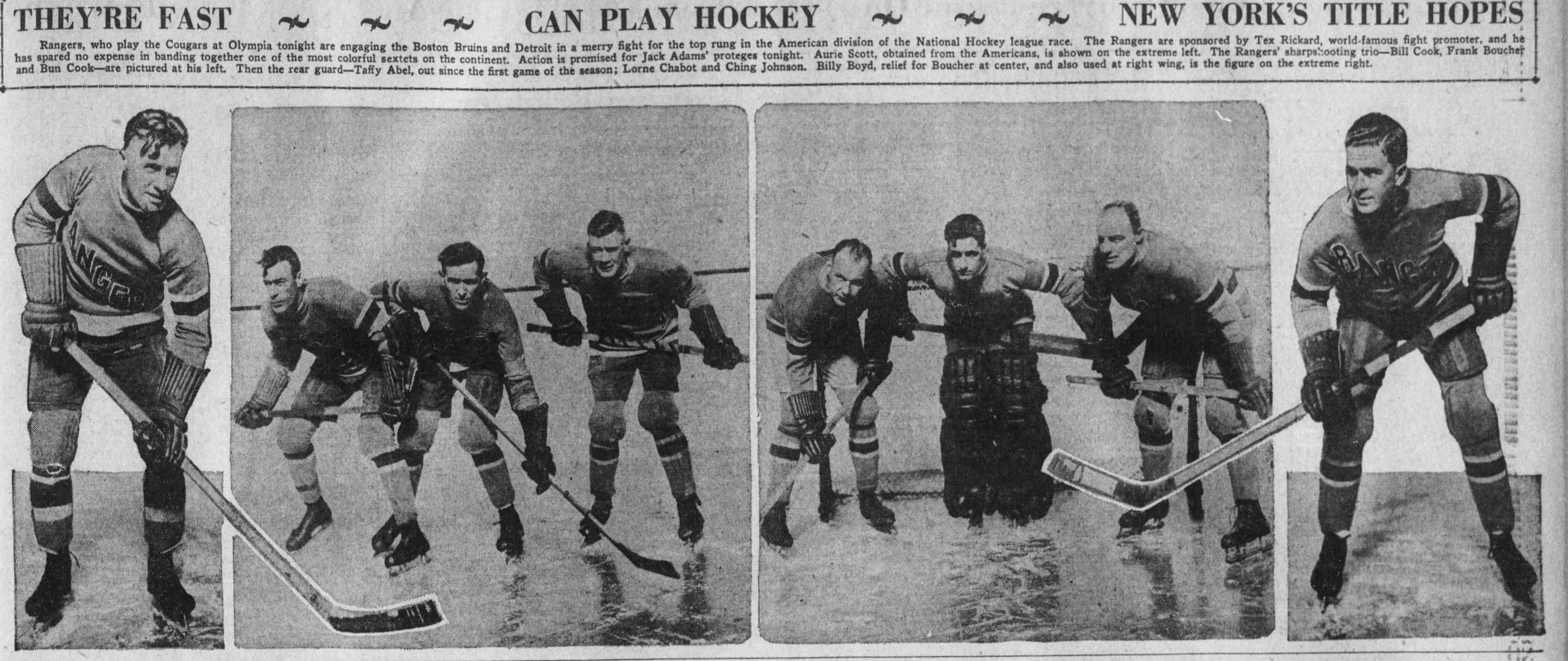
Members of the 1927–28 New York Rangers

The 1927–28 New York Rangers season was the franchise's second season. In the regular season, the Rangers finished in second place in the American Division with a 19–16–9 record and qualified for the Stanley Cup playoffs. In a pair of two-game total goals series, New York defeated the Pittsburgh Pirates and Boston Bruins to advance to the Stanley Cup Finals, where they faced the Montreal Maroons. The Rangers defeated the Maroons 3–2 to win their first Stanley Cup.

== Regular season ==
=== Final standings ===
American Division
	GP	W	L	T	GF	GA	PIM	Pts
**Boston Bruins**	44	20	13	11	77	70	558	51
**New York Rangers**	44	19	16	9	94	79	462	47
**Pittsburgh Pirates**	44	19	17	8	67	76	395	46
Detroit Cougars	44	19	19	6	88	79	395	44
Chicago Black Hawks	44	7	34	3	68	134	375	17

Note: GP = Games Played, W = Wins, L = Losses, T = Ties, Pts = Points, GF = Goals For, GA = Goals Against
Teams that qualified for the playoffs are highlighted in bold.

=== Record vs. opponents ===
==== Vs. American Division ====
1927–28 NHL records
Team	**BOS**	**CHI**	**DET**	**NYR**	**PIT**	**Total**
Boston	—	4–0–2	4–2	2–1–3	1–2–3	**11–5–8**
Chicago	0–4–2	—	2–3–1	2–4	1–5	**5–16–3**
Detroit	2–4	3–2–1	—	2–3–1	3–2–1	**10–11–3**
N.Y. Rangers	1–2–3	4–2	3–2–1	—	3–2–1	**11–8–5**
Pittsburgh	2–1–3	5–1	2–3–1	2–3–1	—	**11–8–5**

==== Vs. Canadian Division ====
1927–28 NHL records
Team	**MTL**	**MTM**	**NYA**	**OTT**	**TOR**	**Total**
Boston	0–2–2	2–2	3–1	3–1	1–2–1	**9–8–3**
Chicago	0–4	1–3	1–3	0–4	0–4	**2–18–0**
Detroit	2–2	3–1	2–0–2	0–3–1	2–2	**9–8–3**
N.Y. Rangers	0–4	1–2–1	3–0–1	2–0–2	2–2	**8–8–4**
Pittsburgh	1–2–1	2–2	1–2–1	1–2–1	3–1	**8–9–3**

== Schedule and results ==
1927–28 regular season
November: 4–1–1 (home: 1–1–1; road: 3–0–0)

Game	November	Opponent	Score	Record
1	15	@ Toronto Maple Leafs	4–2	1–0–0
2	17	Ottawa Senators	3–2	2–0–0
3	20	@ New York Americans	2–1	3–0–0
4	22	Montreal Maroons	4–3	3–1–0
5	27	Boston Bruins	1 – 1 OT	3–1–1
6	29	@ Ottawa Senators	2–1	4–1–1

December: 4–5–3 (home: 2–2–1; road: 2–3–2)

Game	December	Opponent	Score	Record
7	1	@ Montreal Maroons	1 – 1 OT	4–1–2
8	3	@ Chicago Black Hawks	4–2	4–2–2
9	4	@ Detroit Cougars	3–1	5–2–2
10	6	@ Pittsburgh Pirates	2 – 2 OT	5–2–3
11	11	Montreal Canadiens	2–0	5–3–3
12	13	@ Boston Bruins	3–2	6–3–3
13	15	Detroit Cougars	2–1	6–4–3
14	20	Pittsburgh Pirates	2–0	7–4–3
15	25	Chicago Black Hawks	2–0	8–4–3
16	27	@ Boston Bruins	2–0	8–5–3
17	29	New York Americans	3 – 3 OT	8–5–4
18	31	@ Montreal Canadiens	1–0	8–6–4

January: 6–3–1 (home: 4–2–1; road: 2–1–0)

Game	January	Opponent	Score	Record
19	3	Detroit Cougars	4–2	8–7–4
20	8	Chicago Black Hawks	5–0	9–7–4
21	12	Boston Bruins	2 – 2 OT	9–7–5
22	14	@ Toronto Maple Leafs	6–1	9–8–5
23	15	@ Detroit Cougars	2–1	10–8–5
24	17	Toronto Maple Leafs	2–1	10–9–5
25	22	Pittsburgh Pirates	4–1	11–9–5
26	26	Detroit Cougars	3–0	12–9–5
27	29	@ New York Americans	7–0	13–9–5
28	31	Montreal Maroons	3–1	14–9–5

February: 3–3–3 (home: 2–2–1; road: 1–1–2)

Game	February	Opponent	Score	Record
29	4	@ Pittsburgh Pirates	4–2	14–10–5
30	7	Ottawa Senators	0 – 0 OT	14–10–6
31	9	@ Ottawa Senators	0 – 0 OT	14–10–7
32	12	Chicago Black Hawks	3–0	14–11–7
33	19	Boston Bruins	2–0	14–12–7
34	23	Pittsburgh Pirates	3–0	15–12–7
35	25	@ Chicago Black Hawks	1–0	16–12–7
36	26	@ Detroit Cougars	0 – 0 OT	16–12–8
37	28	Toronto Maple Leafs	1–0	17–12–8

March: 2–4–1 (home: 1–1–0; road: 1–3–1)

Game	March	Opponent	Score	Record
38	6	@ Montreal Maroons	3–1	17–13–8
39	8	@ Montreal Canadiens	4–3	17–14–8
40	10	@ Boston Bruins	3 – 3 OT	17–14–9
41	13	Montreal Canadiens	4–1	17–15–9
42	18	New York Americans	7–3	18–15–9
43	21	@ Chicago Black Hawks	6–1	19–15–9
44	24	@ Pittsburgh Pirates	4–2	19–16–9

Legend: Win (2 points) Loss (0 points) Tie (1 point)

== Playoffs ==
The circus knocked the Rangers out of Madison Square Garden, and all games for the Stanley Cup Finals were played in the Montreal Forum. The Maroons won game one 2–0, as Red Dutton and Bill "Bat" Phillips scored goals, and goaltender Clint Benedict made 19 saves.

A well-known incident occurred in game two when Nels Stewart fired a hard shot that struck New York goaltender Lorne Chabot in the eye. He could not continue, and the Rangers needed a goaltender. However, when the Maroons refused to let the Rangers use Alex Connell or minor league goaltender Hugh McCormick, Rangers coach Lester Patrick decided to don the pads himself. The Rangers then increased their defensive pressure when any Maroon attempted a shot on Patrick. Bill Cook scored, putting the Rangers ahead 1–0, but Nels Stewart was not to be denied and scored, tying the game. In overtime, Frank Boucher got the winner for the Rangers 7:05 into overtime. The 44-year-old Patrick made 17 saves in his goaltending stint.

Joe "Red Light" Miller, New York Americans goalie, was allowed to take Chabot's place in goal, and he played well in a 2–0 loss in game three. However, Frank Boucher starred as the Rangers took the next two games, and the Stanley Cup; he scored twice in the Rangers' 2–1 game five victory. The Rangers almost lost another goalie to injury in the final game when Miller was badly cut while Murray Murdoch attempted to clear a loose puck away from goal, but he was able to continue. The crowd became unruly in the third period, throwing objects onto the ice after referee Mike Rodden disallowed an apparent game-tying goal by the Maroons. Even NHL president Frank Calder was a target of some fans immediately following the game. The Rangers became the second Stanley Cup champion from the United States, and the NHL's first American Cup-winning team.

1928 Stanley Cup playoffs
Quarterfinals vs. (A3) Pittsburgh Pirates – Rangers win 6 goals to 4 goals

Game	Date	Visitor	Score	Home	OT	Series
1	March 27	Pittsburgh Pirates	0–4	New York Rangers		New York Rangers leads series 4 goals to 0 goals
2	March 29	Pittsburgh Pirates	4–2	New York Rangers		New York Rangers win series 6 goals to 4 goals

Semifinals vs. (A1) Boston Bruins – Rangers win 5 goals to 2 goals

Game	Date	Visitor	Score	Home	OT	Series
1	March 27	Boston Bruins	1–1	New York Rangers	OT	Series tied 1 goal to 1 goal
2	March 29	New York Rangers	4–1	Boston Bruins		New York Rangers win series 5 goals to 2 goals

Stanley Cup Finals vs. (C2) Montreal Maroons – Rangers win 3–2

Game	Date	Visitor	Score	Home	OT	Series
1	April 5	New York Rangers	0–2	Montreal Maroons		Montreal leads series 1–0
2	April 7	New York Rangers	2–1	Montreal Maroons	OT	Series tied 1–1
3	April 10	New York Rangers	0–2	Montreal Maroons		Montreal leads series 2–1
4	April 12	New York Rangers	1–0	Montreal Maroons		Series tied 2–2
5	April 14	New York Rangers	2–1	Montreal Maroons		New York Rangers win series 3–2

Legend: Win Loss Tie

== Player statistics ==
Skaters

Regular season
Player	GP	G	A	Pts	PIM
Frank Boucher	44	23	12	35	14
Frederick Cook	44	14	14	28	45
Bill Cook	43	18	6	24	42
Ivan Johnson	43	10	6	16	146
Murray Murdoch	43	7	3	10	14
Paul Thompson	41	4	4	8	22
Leo Bourgeault	35	7	0	7	72
Alex Gray	44	7	0	7	30
Billy Boyd	38	4	0	4	11
Clarence Abel	22	0	1	1	28
Laurie Scott	23	0	1	1	6
Frank Callighen	26	0	0	0	32

Playoffs
Player	GP	G	A	Pts	PIM
Frank Boucher	9	7	3	10	2
Bill Cook	9	2	3	5	26
Murray Murdoch	9	2	1	3	12
Frederick Cook	9	2	1	3	10
Ivan Johnson	9	1	1	2	46
Clarence Abel	9	1	0	1	14
Alex Gray	9	1	0	1	0
Frank Callighen	9	0	0	0	0
Billy Boyd	9	0	0	0	0
Leo Bourgeault	9	0	0	0	10
Paul Thompson	8	0	0	0	30

Goaltenders

Regular season
Player	GP	TOI	W	L	T	GA	GAA	SO
Lorne Chabot	44	2730	19	16	9	79	1.74	11

Goaltenders

Playoffs
Player	GP	TOI	W	L	T	GA	GAA	SO
Lorne Chabot	6	321	2	2	1	8	1.50	1
Joe Miller	3	180	2	1	0	3	1.00	1
Lester Patrick	1	46	1	0	0	1	1.30	0

^{†}Denotes player spent time with another team before joining Rangers. Stats reflect time with Rangers only.
^{‡}Traded mid-season. Stats reflect time with Rangers only.

Note:

Pos = Position;GP = Games played; G = Goals; A = Assists; Pts = Points; PIM = Penalty minutes; +/- = Plus/minus; PPG = Power-play goals; SHG = Short-handed goals; GWG = Game-winning goals
Pos = Position;GP = Games played; Min, TOI = Minutes played; W = Wins; L = Losses; T,T/OT = Ties; OTL = Overtime losses; GA = Goals-against; GAA = Goals-against average; SO = Shutouts; SA = Shots against; SV = Shots saved;SV% = Save percentage;

== See also ==
- 1927–28 NHL season
