= List of NHL playoff series =

This is a complete listing of National Hockey League (NHL) playoff series, grouped by franchise. Series featuring relocated teams (Note: Series featuring the Arizona Coyotes include series played as the Phoenix Coyotes (1997–2014); series featuring the Calgary Flames include series played as the Atlanta Flames (1972–1980); series featuring the Carolina Hurricanes include series played as the Hartford Whalers (1979–1997); series featuring the Colorado Avalanche include series played as the Quebec Nordiques (1979–1995); series featuring the Dallas Stars include series played as the Minnesota North Stars (1967–1993); series featuring the New Jersey Devils include series played as the Colorado Rockies (1976–1982); series featuring the Winnipeg Jets include series played as the Winnipeg Jets (1979–1996) and Atlanta Thrashers (1999–2011).) are kept with their ultimate relocation franchises. Bolded years indicate wins. Years in italics indicate series in progress. Tables are sorted first by the number of series, then the number of wins, and then alphabetically.

== Anaheim Ducks ==
Opponent	S	Occurrences	GP	Rec	%
Detroit Red Wings	6	1997, 1999, **2003**, **2007**, 2009, 2013	32	2–4	.333
Calgary Flames	3	**2006**, **2015**, **2017**	16	3–0	1.000
Dallas Stars	3	**2003**, 2008, **2014**	18	2–1	.667
Edmonton Oilers	3	2006, **2017**, **2026**	18	2–1	.667
Nashville Predators	3	2011, 2016, 2017	19	0–3	.000
Minnesota Wild	2	**2003**, **2007**	9	2–0	1.000
San Jose Sharks	2	**2009**, 2018	10	1–1	.500
Arizona Coyotes	1	**1997**	7	1–0	1.000
Colorado Avalanche	1	**2006**	4	1–0	1.000
Ottawa Senators	1	**2007**	5	1–0	1.000
Vancouver Canucks	1	**2007**	5	1–0	1.000
Winnipeg Jets	1	**2015**	4	1–0	1.000
Chicago Blackhawks	1	2015	7	0–1	.000
Los Angeles Kings	1	2014	7	0–1	.000
New Jersey Devils	1	2003	7	0–1	.000
Vegas Golden Knights	1	2026	6	0–1	.000
Totals	31		174	17–14	.548

== Boston Bruins ==
Opponent	S	Occurrences	GP	Rec	%
Montreal Canadiens	34	**1929**, 1930, 1931, **1943**, 1946, 1947, 1952, 1953, 1954, 1955, 1957, 1958, 1968, 1969, 1971, 1977, 1978, 1979, 1984, 1985, 1986, 1987, **1988**, 1989, **1990**, **1991**, **1992**, **1994**, 2002, 2004, 2008, **2009**, **2011**, 2014	177	9–25	.265
Toronto Maple Leafs	17	1933, 1935, 1936, 1938, **1939**, **1941**, 1948, 1949, 1951, 1959, **1969**, **1972**, **1974**, **2013**, **2018**, **2019**, **2024**	90	9–8	.529
New York Rangers	10	**1927**, 1928, **1929**, **1939**, 1940, **1958**, **1970**, **1972**, 1973, **2013**	47	7–3	.700
Buffalo Sabres	9	**1982**, **1983**, **1988**, **1989**, **1992**, 1993, 1999, **2010**, 2026	51	6–3	.667
Detroit Red Wings	8	**1941**, 1942, 1943, 1945, **1946**, **1953**, **1957**, **2014**	38	5–3	.625
Carolina Hurricanes	7	**1990**, **1991**, **1999**, 2009, **2019**, **2020**, 2022	42	5–2	.714
Chicago Blackhawks	7	**1927**, **1942**, **1970**, **1974**, 1975, **1978**, 2013	28	5–2	.714
Philadelphia Flyers	6	1974, 1976, **1977**, **1978**, 2010, **2011**	32	3–3	.500
Pittsburgh Penguins	5	**1979**, **1980**, 1991, 1992, **2013**	23	3–2	.600
Washington Capitals	4	**1990**, 1998, 2012, **2021**	23	2–2	.500
New Jersey Devils	4	**1988**, 1994, 1995, 2003	23	1–3	.250
St. Louis Blues	3	**1970**, **1972**, 2019	15	2–1	.667
Tampa Bay Lightning	3	**2011**, 2018, 2020	18	1–2	.333
Florida Panthers	3	1996, 2023, 2024	18	0–3	.000
New York Islanders	3	1980, 1983, 2021	17	0–3	.000
Los Angeles Kings	2	**1976**, **1977**	13	2–0	1.000
Colorado Avalanche	2	1982, **1983**	11	1–1	.500
Montreal Maroons	2	**1930**, 1937	7	1–1	.500
Edmonton Oilers	2	1988, 1990	9	0–2	.000
Columbus Blue Jackets	1	**2019**	6	1–0	1.000
Vancouver Canucks	1	**2011**	7	1–0	1.000
Dallas Stars	1	1981	3	0–1	.000
Ottawa Senators	1	2017	6	0–1	.000
Ottawa Senators (original)	1	1927	4	0–1	.000
Totals (Note: Games played totals against Philadelphia, Tampa Bay and Washington include one round-robin game from the 2020 Stanley Cup playoffs. As these games were played only to determine playoff seeding, they are not considered to be a complete series and are not counted in the occurrences section or the total series win–loss records.)	136		708	64–72	.471

== Buffalo Sabres ==
Opponent	S	Occurrences	GP	Rec	%
Boston Bruins	9	1982, 1983, 1988, 1989, 1992, **1993**, **1999**, 2010, **2026**	51	3–6	.333
Philadelphia Flyers	9	1975, 1978, 1995, 1997, **1998**, 2000, **2001**, **2006**, 2011	50	3–6	.333
Montreal Canadiens	8	1973, **1975**, **1983**, 1990, 1991, 1993, **1998**, 2026	42	3–5	.375
Ottawa Senators	4	**1997**, **1999**, **2006**, 2007	21	3–1	.750
New York Islanders	4	1976, 1977, 1980, **2007**	21	1–3	.250
Dallas Stars	3	**1977**, 1981, 1999	13	1–2	.333
Chicago Blackhawks	2	**1975**, **1980**	9	2–0	1.000
New York Rangers	2	**1978**, **2007**	9	2–0	1.000
Vancouver Canucks	2	**1980**, **1981**	7	2–0	1.000
Colorado Avalanche	2	1984, 1985	8	0–2	.000
Pittsburgh Penguins	2	1979, 2001	10	0–2	.000
St. Louis Blues	1	**1976**	3	1–0	1.000
Toronto Maple Leafs	1	**1999**	5	1–0	1.000
Carolina Hurricanes	1	2006	7	0–1	.000
New Jersey Devils	1	1994	7	0–1	.000
Washington Capitals	1	1998	6	0–1	.000
Totals	52		269	22–30	.423

== Calgary Flames ==
Opponent	S	Occurrences	GP	Rec	%
Vancouver Canucks	7	1982, **1983**, **1984**, **1989**, 1994, **2004**, **2015**	38	5–2	.714
Los Angeles Kings	6	1976, 1977, **1988**, **1989**, 1990, 1993	26	2–4	.333
Edmonton Oilers	6	1983, 1984, **1986**, 1988, 1991, 2022	35	1–5	.167
Chicago Blackhawks	4	**1981**, **1989**, 1996, 2009	18	2–2	.500
Winnipeg Jets	4	1985, **1986**, 1987, **2020**	17	2–2	.500
Dallas Stars	3	1981, 2020, **2022**	19	1–2	.333
Detroit Red Wings	3	1978, **2004**, 2007	14	1–2	.333
San Jose Sharks	3	1995, **2004**, 2008	20	1–2	.333
Anaheim Ducks	3	2006, 2015, 2017	16	0–3	.000
Montreal Canadiens	2	1986, **1989**	11	1–1	.500
Philadelphia Flyers	2	1974, **1981**	11	1–1	.500
St. Louis Blues	1	**1986**	7	1–0	1.000
Colorado Avalanche	1	2019	5	0–1	.000
New York Rangers	1	1980	4	0–1	.000
Tampa Bay Lightning	1	2004	7	0–1	.000
Toronto Maple Leafs	1	1979	2	0–1	.000
Totals	48		250	18–30	.375

== Carolina Hurricanes ==
Opponent	S	Occurrences	GP	Rec	%
Montreal Canadiens	8	1980, 1986, 1988, 1989, 1992, **2002**, **2006**, **2026**	44	3–5	.375
Boston Bruins	7	1990, 1991, 1999, **2009**, 2019, 2020, **2022**	42	2–5	.286
New Jersey Devils	6	2001, **2002**, **2006**, **2009**, **2023**, **2025**	34	5–1	.833
New York Islanders	3	**2019**, **2023**, **2024**	15	3–0	1.000
New York Rangers	3	**2020**, 2022, 2024	16	1–2	.333
Washington Capitals	2	**2019**, **2025**	12	2–0	1.000
Colorado Avalanche	2	**1986**, 1987	9	1–1	.500
Florida Panthers	2	2023, 2025	9	0–2	.000
Buffalo Sabres	1	**2006**	7	1–0	1.000
Edmonton Oilers	1	**2006**	7	1–0	1.000
Nashville Predators	1	**2021**	6	1–0	1.000
Ottawa Senators	1	**2026**	4	1–0	1.000
Philadelphia Flyers	1	**2026**	4	1–0	1.000
Toronto Maple Leafs	1	**2002**	6	1–0	1.000
Vegas Golden Knights	1	**2026**	6	1–0	1.000
Detroit Red Wings	1	2002	5	0–1	.000
Pittsburgh Penguins	1	2009	4	0–1	.000
Tampa Bay Lightning	1	2021	5	0–1	.000
Totals	43		234	24–19	.558

== Chicago Blackhawks ==
Opponent	S	Occurrences	GP	Rec	%
Montreal Canadiens	17	1930, 1931, **1934**, **1938**, **1941**, 1944, 1946, 1953, 1959, 1960, **1961**, **1962**, 1965, 1968, 1971, 1973, 1976	81	5–12	.294
Detroit Red Wings	16	**1934**, 1941, **1944**, **1961**, 1963, 1964, **1965**, 1966, **1970**, **1985**, 1987, **1989**, **1992**, 1995, 2009, **2013**	81	9–7	.563
St. Louis Blues	12	**1973**, **1980**, **1982**, **1983**, 1988, **1989**, **1990**, **1992**, 1993, 2002, **2014**, 2016	63	8–4	.667
Toronto Maple Leafs	9	**1931**, 1932, **1938**, 1940, 1962, 1967, 1986, 1994, **1995**	38	3–6	.333
Boston Bruins	7	1927, 1942, 1970, 1974, **1975**, 1978, **2013**	28	2–5	.286
Dallas Stars	6	**1982**, **1983**, 1984, **1985**, **1990**, 1991	33	4–2	.667
New York Rangers	5	**1931**, **1968**, **1971**, 1972, **1973**	24	4–1	.800
Vancouver Canucks	5	1982, **1995**, **2009**, **2010**, 2011	28	3–2	.600
Edmonton Oilers	5	1983, 1985, 1990, **1992**, **2020**	24	2–3	.400
Calgary Flames	4	1981, 1989, **1996**, **2009**	18	2–2	.500
Minnesota Wild	3	**2013**, **2014**, **2015**	15	3–0	1.000
Los Angeles Kings	3	**1974**, **2013**, 2014	17	2–1	.667
Nashville Predators	3	**2010**, **2015**, 2017	16	2–1	.667
Philadelphia Flyers	2	**1971**, **2010**	10	2–0	1.000
Montreal Maroons	2	**1934**, 1935	4	1–1	.500
New York Americans	2	1936, **1938**	5	1–1	.500
Pittsburgh Penguins	2	**1972**, 1992	8	1–1	.500
Buffalo Sabres	2	1975, 1980	9	0–2	.000
Colorado Avalanche	2	1996, 1997	12	0–2	.000
New York Islanders	2	1977, 1979	6	0–2	.000
Anaheim Ducks	1	**2015**	7	1–0	1.000
San Jose Sharks	1	**2010**	4	1–0	1.000
Tampa Bay Lightning	1	**2015**	6	1–0	1.000
Arizona Coyotes	1	2012	6	0–1	.000
Vegas Golden Knights	1	2020	5	0–1	.000
Totals	114		548	57–57	.500

== Colorado Avalanche ==
Opponent	S	Occurrences	GP	Rec	%
Dallas Stars	7	1999, 2000, **2004**, **2006**, 2020, 2024, 2025	45	2–5	.286
Detroit Red Wings	6	**1996**, 1997, **1999**, **2000**, 2002, 2008	34	3–3	.500
Montreal Canadiens	5	**1982**, 1984, **1985**, 1987, 1993	31	2–3	.400
San Jose Sharks	5	**1999**, **2002**, 2004, 2010, 2019	32	2–3	.400
Minnesota Wild	4	2003, **2008**, 2014, **2026**	25	2–2	.500
Los Angeles Kings	3	**2001**, **2002**, **2026**	18	3–0	1.000
St. Louis Blues	3	**2001**, **2021**, **2022**	16	3–0	1.000
Edmonton Oilers	3	**1997**, 1998, **2022**	16	2–1	.667
Arizona Coyotes	2	**2000**, **2020**	10	2–0	1.000
Buffalo Sabres	2	**1984**, **1985**	8	2–0	1.000
Chicago Blackhawks	2	**1996**, **1997**	12	2–0	1.000
Vancouver Canucks	2	**1996**, **2001**	10	2–0	1.000
Boston Bruins	2	**1982**, 1983	11	1–1	.500
Carolina Hurricanes	2	1986, **1987**	9	1–1	.500
Nashville Predators	2	2018, **2022**	10	1–1	.500
Philadelphia Flyers	2	1981, 1985	11	0–2	.000
Vegas Golden Knights	2	2021, 2026	11	0–2	.000
Calgary Flames	1	**2019**	5	1–0	1.000
Florida Panthers	1	**1996**	4	1–0	1.000
New Jersey Devils	1	**2001**	7	1–0	1.000
Tampa Bay Lightning	1	**2022**	6	1–0	1.000
Winnipeg Jets	1	**2024**	5	1–0	1.000
Anaheim Ducks	1	2006	4	0–1	.000
New York Islanders	1	1982	4	0–1	.000
New York Rangers	1	1995	6	0–1	.000
Seattle Kraken	1	2023	7	0–1	.000
Totals (Note: Games played totals against Dallas, St. Louis and Vegas include one round-robin game from the 2020 Stanley Cup playoffs. As these games were played only to determine playoff seeding, they are not considered to be a complete series and are not counted in the occurrences section or the total series win–loss records.)	63		357	35–28	.556

== Columbus Blue Jackets ==
Opponent	S	Occurrences	GP	Rec	%
Tampa Bay Lightning	2	**2019**, 2020	9	1–1	.500
Pittsburgh Penguins	2	2014, 2017	11	0–2	.000
Toronto Maple Leafs	1	**2020**	5	1–0	1.000
Boston Bruins	1	2019	6	0–1	.000
Detroit Red Wings	1	2009	4	0–1	.000
Washington Capitals	1	2018	6	0–1	.000
Totals	8		41	2–6	.250

== Dallas Stars ==
Opponent	S	Occurrences	GP	Rec	%
St. Louis Blues	14	1968, 1970, **1971**, 1972, **1984**, **1985**, 1986, 1989, **1991**, **1994**, **1999**, 2001, 2016, 2019	81	6–8	.429
Edmonton Oilers	10	1984, **1991**, 1997, **1998**, **1999**, **2000**, **2001**, **2003**, 2024, 2025	53	6–4	.600
Colorado Avalanche	7	**1999**, **2000**, 2004, 2006, **2020**, **2024**, **2025**	45	5–2	.714
Chicago Blackhawks	6	1982, 1983, **1984**, 1985, 1990, **1991**	33	2–4	.333
Detroit Red Wings	4	1992, 1995, 1998, 2008	24	0–4	.000
San Jose Sharks	3	**1998**, **2000**, **2008**	17	3–0	1.000
Buffalo Sabres	3	1977, **1981**, **1999**	13	2–1	.667
Calgary Flames	3	**1981**, **2020**, 2022	19	2–1	.667
Minnesota Wild	3	**2016**, **2023**, 2026	18	2–1	.667
Vegas Golden Knights	3	**2020**, 2023, **2024**	19	2–1	.667
Anaheim Ducks	3	2003, **2008**, 2014	18	1–2	.333
Toronto Maple Leafs	2	**1980**, **1983**	7	2–0	1.000
Montreal Canadiens	2	1971, **1980**	13	1–1	.500
Philadelphia Flyers	2	1973, 1980	11	0–2	.000
Vancouver Canucks	2	1994, 2007	12	0–2	.000
Boston Bruins	1	**1981**	3	1–0	1.000
Los Angeles Kings	1	**1968**	7	1–0	1.000
Nashville Predators	1	**2019**	6	1–0	1.000
Seattle Kraken	1	**2023**	7	1–0	1.000
Winnipeg Jets	1	**2025**	6	1–0	1.000
New Jersey Devils	1	2000	6	0–1	.000
New York Islanders	1	1981	5	0–1	.000
Pittsburgh Penguins	1	1991	6	0–1	.000
Tampa Bay Lightning	1	2020	6	0–1	.000
Totals (Note: Games played totals against Colorado, St. Louis and Vegas include one round-robin game from the 2020 Stanley Cup playoffs. As these games were played only to determine playoff seeding, they are not considered to be a complete series and are not counted in the occurrences section or the total series win–loss records.)	76		435	39–37	.513

== Detroit Red Wings ==
Opponent	S	Occurrences	GP	Rec	%
Toronto Maple Leafs	23	1929, **1934**, **1936**, 1939, 1940, 1942, **1943**, 1945, 1947, 1948, 1949, **1950**, **1952**, **1954**, **1955**, **1956**, 1960, **1961**, 1963, 1964, **1987**, **1988**, 1993	117	11–12	.478
Chicago Blackhawks	16	1934, **1941**, 1944, 1961, **1963**, **1964**, 1965, **1966**, 1970, 1985, **1987**, 1989, 1992, **1995**, **2009**, 2013	81	7–9	.438
Montreal Canadiens	12	**1937**, **1939**, **1942**, **1949**, 1951, **1952**, **1954**, **1955**, 1956, 1958, 1966, 1978	62	7–5	.583
Boston Bruins	8	1941, **1942**, **1943**, **1945**, 1946, 1953, 1957, 2014	38	3–5	.375
St. Louis Blues	7	1984, **1988**, 1991, **1996**, **1997**, **1998**, **2002**	40	5–2	.714
Anaheim Ducks	6	**1997**, **1999**, 2003, 2007, **2009**, **2013**	32	4–2	.667
Colorado Avalanche	6	1996, **1997**, 1999, 2000, **2002**, **2008**	34	3–3	.500
New York Rangers	5	1933, **1937**, **1941**, **1948**, **1950**	23	4–1	.800
San Jose Sharks	5	1994, **1995**, **2007**, 2010, 2011	29	2–3	.400
Arizona Coyotes	3	**1998**, **2010**, **2011**	17	3–0	1.000
Dallas Stars	4	**1992**, **1995**, **1998**, **2008**	24	4–0	1.000
Calgary Flames	3	**1978**, 2004, **2007**	14	2–1	.667
Montreal Maroons	3	1932, **1933**, **1936**	7	2–1	.667
Nashville Predators	3	**2004**, **2008**, 2012	17	2–1	.667
Edmonton Oilers	3	1987, 1988, 2006	16	0–3	.000
Los Angeles Kings	2	**2000**, 2001	10	1–1	.500
Pittsburgh Penguins	2	**2008**, 2009	13	1–1	.500
Tampa Bay Lightning	2	2015, 2016	12	0–2	.000
Carolina Hurricanes	1	**2002**	5	1–0	1.000
Columbus Blue Jackets	1	**2009**	4	1–0	1.000
New York Americans	1	**1940**	3	1–0	1.000
Philadelphia Flyers	1	**1997**	4	1–0	1.000
Vancouver Canucks	1	**2002**	6	1–0	1.000
Washington Capitals	1	**1998**	4	1–0	1.000
Winnipeg Jets	1	**1996**	6	1–0	1.000
New Jersey Devils	1	1995	4	0–1	.000
Totals	121		622	68–53	.562

== Edmonton Oilers ==
Opponent	S	Occurrences	GP	Rec	%
Los Angeles Kings	11	1982, **1985**, **1987**, 1989, **1990**, **1991**, **1992**, **2022**, **2023**, **2024**, **2025**	60	9–2	.818
Dallas Stars	10	**1984**, 1991, **1997**, 1998, 1999, 2000, 2001, 2003, **2024**, **2025**	53	4–6	.400
Winnipeg Jets	7	**1983**, **1984**, **1985**, **1987**, **1988**, **1990**, 2021	30	6–1	.857
Calgary Flames	6	**1983**, **1984**, 1986, **1988**, **1991**, **2022**	35	5–1	.833
Chicago Blackhawks	5	**1983**, **1985**, **1990**, 1992, 2020	24	3–2	.600
Detroit Red Wings	3	**1987**, **1988**, **2006**	16	3–0	1.000
Vancouver Canucks	3	**1986**, **1992**, **2024**	16	3–0	1.000
Philadelphia Flyers	3	1980, **1985**, **1987**	15	2–1	.667
Anaheim Ducks	3	**2006**, 2017, 2026	18	1–2	.333
Colorado Avalanche	3	1997, **1998**, 2022	16	1–2	.333
New York Islanders	3	1981, 1983, **1984**	15	1–2	.333
Boston Bruins	2	**1988**, **1990**	9	2–0	1.000
San Jose Sharks	2	**2006**, **2017**	12	2–0	1.000
Vegas Golden Knights	2	2023, **2025**	11	1–1	.500
Florida Panthers	2	2024, 2025	13	0–2	.000
Montreal Canadiens	1	**1981**	3	1–0	1.000
Carolina Hurricanes	1	2006	7	0–1	.000
Totals	67		353	44–23	.657

== Florida Panthers ==
Opponent	S	Occurrences	GP	Rec	%
Tampa Bay Lightning	4	2021, 2022, **2024**, **2025**	20	2–2	.500
Boston Bruins	3	**1996**, **2023**, **2024**	18	3–0	1.000
Carolina Hurricanes	2	**2023**, **2025**	9	2–0	1.000
Edmonton Oilers	2	**2024**, **2025**	13	2–0	1.000
Toronto Maple Leafs	2	**2023**, **2025**	12	2–0	1.000
New York Rangers	2	1997, **2024**	11	1–1	.500
New Jersey Devils	2	2000, 2012	11	0–2	.000
New York Islanders	2	2016, 2020	10	0–2	.000
Philadelphia Flyers	1	**1996**	6	1–0	1.000
Pittsburgh Penguins	1	**1996**	7	1–0	1.000
Washington Capitals	1	**2022**	6	1–0	1.000
Colorado Avalanche	1	1996	4	0–1	.000
Vegas Golden Knights	1	2023	5	0–1	.000
Totals	24		132	15–9	.625

== Los Angeles Kings ==
Opponent	S	Occurrences	GP	Rec	%
Edmonton Oilers	11	**1982**, 1985, 1987, **1989**, 1990, 1991, 1992, 2022, 2023, 2024, 2025	60	2–9	.182
Calgary Flames	6	**1976**, **1977**, 1988, 1989, **1990**, **1993**	26	4–2	.667
Vancouver Canucks	5	1982, **1991**, **1993**, 2010, **2012**	28	3–2	.600
St. Louis Blues	4	1969, 1998, **2012**, **2013**	18	2–2	.500
San Jose Sharks	4	2011, **2013**, **2014**, 2016	22	2–2	.500
Chicago Blackhawks	3	1974, 2013, **2014**	17	1–2	.333
New York Rangers	3	1979, 1981, **2014**	11	1–2	.333
Toronto Maple Leafs	3	1975, 1978, **1993**	12	1–2	.333
Colorado Avalanche	3	2001, 2002, 2026	18	0–3	.000
Detroit Red Wings	2	2000, **2001**	10	1–1	.500
Boston Bruins	2	1976, 1977	13	0–2	.000
Anaheim Ducks	1	**2014**	7	1–0	1.000
Arizona Coyotes	1	**2012**	5	1–0	1.000
California Golden Seals	1	**1969**	7	1–0	1.000
New Jersey Devils	1	**2012**	6	1–0	1.000
Dallas Stars	1	1968	7	0–1	.000
Montreal Canadiens	1	1993	5	0–1	.000
New York Islanders	1	1980	4	0–1	.000
Vegas Golden Knights	1	2018	4	0–1	.000
Totals	54		283	21–33	.389

== Minnesota Wild ==
Opponent	S	Occurrences	GP	Rec	%
Colorado Avalanche	4	**2003**, 2008, **2014**, 2026	25	2–2	.500
Dallas Stars	3	2016, 2023, **2026**	18	1–2	.333
St. Louis Blues	3	**2015**, 2017, 2022	17	1–2	.333
Chicago Blackhawks	3	2013, 2014, 2015	15	0–3	.000
Vancouver Canucks	2	**2003**, 2020	11	1–1	.500
Anaheim Ducks	2	2003, 2007	9	0–2	.000
Vegas Golden Knights	2	2021, 2025	13	0–2	.000
Winnipeg Jets	1	2018	5	0–1	.000
Totals	20		113	5–15	.250

== Montreal Canadiens ==
Opponent	S	Occurrences	GP	Rec	%
Boston Bruins	34	1929, **1930**, **1931**, 1943, **1946**, **1947**, **1952**, **1953**, **1954**, **1955**, **1957**, **1958**, **1968**, **1969**, **1971**, **1977**, **1978**, **1979**, **1984**, **1985**, **1986**, **1987**, 1988, **1989**, 1990, 1991, 1992, 1994, **2002**, **2004**, **2008**, 2009, 2011, **2014**	177	25–9	.735
Chicago Blackhawks	17	**1930**, **1931**, 1934, 1938, 1941, **1944**, **1946**, **1953**, **1959**, **1960**, 1961, 1962, **1965**, **1968**, **1971**, **1973**, **1976**	81	12–5	.706
Toronto Maple Leafs	16	1918, **1925**, **1944**, 1945, 1947, 1951, **1959**, **1960**, 1963, 1964, **1965**, **1966**, 1967, **1978**, **1979**, **2021**	78	9–7	.563
New York Rangers	16	**1930**, 1932, 1933, 1935, 1950, **1956**, **1957**, **1967**, **1969**, 1972, 1974, **1979**, **1986**, 1996, 2014, 2017	73	7–9	.438
Detroit Red Wings	12	1937, 1939, 1942, 1949, **1951**, 1952, 1954, 1955, **1956**, **1958**, **1966**, **1978**	62	5–7	.417
Buffalo Sabres	8	**1973**, 1975, 1983, **1990**, **1991**, **1993**, 1998, **2026**	42	5–3	.625
Carolina Hurricanes	8	**1980**, **1986**, **1988**, **1989**, **1992**, 2002, 2006, 2026	44	5–3	.625
Philadelphia Flyers	7	**1973**, **1976**, 1987, **1989**, 2008, 2010, 2020	37	3–4	.429
Colorado Avalanche	5	1982, **1984**, 1985, **1987**, **1993**	31	3–2	.600
Tampa Bay Lightning	5	2004, **2014**, 2015, 2021, **2026**	26	2–3	.400
New York Islanders	4	**1976**, **1977**, 1984, **1993**	22	3–1	.750
Ottawa Senators (original)	4	**1919**, 1923, **1924**, 1927	11	2–2	.500
Pittsburgh Penguins	3	**1998**, **2010**, **2020**	17	3–0	1.000
St. Louis Blues	3	**1968**, **1969**, **1977**	12	3–0	1.000
Calgary Flames	2	**1986**, 1989	11	1–1	.500
Dallas Stars	2	**1971**, 1980	13	1–1	.500
Montreal Maroons	2	**1927**, 1928	4	1–1	.500
Ottawa Senators	2	2013, **2015**	11	1–1	.500
Washington Capitals	2	**2010**, 2025	12	1–1	.500
Los Angeles Kings	1	**1993**	5	1–0	1.000
Vancouver Canucks	1	**1975**	5	1–0	1.000
Vegas Golden Knights	1	**2021**	6	1–0	1.000
Winnipeg Jets	1	**2021**	4	1–0	1.000
Edmonton Oilers	1	1981	3	0–1	.000
New Jersey Devils	1	1997	5	0–1	.000
Totals (Note: Totals only include series and games played against NHL franchises and excludes four series and thirteen Stanley Cup playoff games; including eleven Stanley Cup Finals games played from 1919–1925.)	158		792	96–62	.608

== Nashville Predators ==
Opponent	S	Occurrences	GP	Rec	%
Anaheim Ducks	3	**2011**, **2016**, **2017**	19	3–0	1.000
Chicago Blackhawks	3	2010, 2015, **2017**	16	1–2	.333
Detroit Red Wings	3	2004, 2008, **2012**	17	1–2	.333
San Jose Sharks	3	2006, 2007, 2016	17	0–3	.000
Colorado Avalanche	2	**2018**, 2022	10	1–1	.500
Arizona Coyotes	2	2012, 2020	9	0–2	.000
Vancouver Canucks	2	2011, 2024	12	0–2	.000
St. Louis Blues	1	**2017**	6	1–0	1.000
Carolina Hurricanes	1	2021	6	0–1	.000
Dallas Stars	1	2019	6	0–1	.000
Pittsburgh Penguins	1	2017	6	0–1	.000
Winnipeg Jets	1	2018	7	0–1	.000
Totals	23		131	7–16	.304

== New Jersey Devils ==
Opponent	S	Occurrences	GP	Rec	%
New York Rangers	7	1992, 1994, 1997, **2006**, 2008, **2012**, **2023**	41	3–4	.429
Philadelphia Flyers	6	1978, **1995**, **2000**, 2004, 2010, **2012**	30	3–3	.500
Carolina Hurricanes	6	**2001**, 2002, 2006, 2009, 2023, 2025	34	1–5	.167
Pittsburgh Penguins	5	1991, 1993, **1995**, 1999, **2001**	29	2–3	.400
Boston Bruins	4	1988, **1994**, **1995**, **2003**	23	3–1	.750
Tampa Bay Lightning	3	**2003**, **2007**, 2018	16	2–1	.667
Ottawa Senators	3	1998, **2003**, 2007	18	1–2	.333
Florida Panthers	2	**2000**, **2012**	11	2–0	1.000
Toronto Maple Leafs	2	**2000**, **2001**	13	2–0	1.000
Washington Capitals	2	**1988**, 1990	13	1–1	.500
Anaheim Ducks	1	**2003**	7	1–0	1.000
Buffalo Sabres	1	**1994**	7	1–0	1.000
Dallas Stars	1	**2000**	6	1–0	1.000
Detroit Red Wings	1	**1995**	4	1–0	1.000
Montreal Canadiens	1	**1997**	5	1–0	1.000
New York Islanders	1	**1988**	6	1–0	1.000
Colorado Avalanche	1	2001	7	0–1	.000
Los Angeles Kings	1	2012	6	0–1	.000
Totals	48		276	26–22	.542

== New York Islanders ==
Opponent	S	Occurrences	GP	Rec	%
Washington Capitals	8	**1983**, **1984**, **1985**, 1986, **1987**, **1993**, 2015, **2020**	42	6–2	.750
New York Rangers	8	**1975**, 1979, **1981**, **1982**, **1983**, **1984**, 1990, 1994	39	5–3	.625
Pittsburgh Penguins	6	**1975**, **1982**, **1993**, 2013, **2019**, **2021**	35	5–1	.833
Philadelphia Flyers	5	1975, **1980**, 1985, 1987, **2020**	32	2–3	.400
Buffalo Sabres	4	**1976**, **1977**, **1980**, 2007	21	3–1	.750
Montreal Canadiens	4	1976, 1977, **1984**, 1993	22	1–3	.250
Tampa Bay Lightning	4	2004, 2016, 2020, 2021	23	0–4	.000
Boston Bruins	3	**1980**, **1983**, **2021**	17	3–0	1.000
Edmonton Oilers	3	**1981**, **1983**, 1984	15	2–1	.667
Toronto Maple Leafs	3	1978, **1981**, 2002	17	1–2	.333
Carolina Hurricanes	3	2019, 2023, 2024	15	0–3	.000
Chicago Blackhawks	2	**1977**, **1979**	6	2–0	1.000
Florida Panthers	2	**2016**, **2020**	10	2–0	1.000
Vancouver Canucks	2	**1976**, **1982**	6	2–0	1.000
Colorado Avalanche	1	**1982**	4	1–0	1.000
Dallas Stars	1	**1981**	5	1–0	1.000
Los Angeles Kings	1	**1980**	4	1–0	1.000
New Jersey Devils	1	1988	6	0–1	.000
Ottawa Senators	1	2003	5	0–1	.000
Totals	62		324	37–25	.597

== New York Rangers ==
Opponent	S	Occurrences	GP	Rec	%
Montreal Canadiens	16	1930, **1932**, **1933**, **1935**, **1950**, 1956, 1957, 1967, 1969, **1972**, **1974**, 1979, 1986, **1996**, **2014**, **2017**	73	9–7	.562
Philadelphia Flyers	11	1974, **1979**, 1980, **1982**, **1983**, 1985, **1986**, 1987, 1995, 1997, **2014**	54	5–6	.455
Washington Capitals	10	**1986**, 1990, 1991, **1994**, 2009, 2011, **2012**, **2013**, **2015**, **2024**	59	6–4	.600
Boston Bruins	10	1927, **1928**, 1929, 1939, **1940**, 1958, 1970, 1972, **1973**, 2013	47	3–7	.429
Toronto Maple Leafs	8	**1929**, 1932, **1933**, **1937**, **1940**, 1942, 1962, **1971**	35	5–3	.625
New York Islanders	8	1975, **1979**, 1981, 1982, 1983, 1984, **1990**, **1994**	39	3–5	.375
Pittsburgh Penguins	8	1989, 1992, 1996, 2008, **2014**, **2015**, 2016, **2022**	44	3–5	.375
New Jersey Devils	7	**1992**, **1994**, **1997**, 2006, **2008**, 2012, 2023	41	4–3	.571
Montreal Maroons	5	**1928**, **1931**, 1934, 1935, **1937**	13	3–2	.600
Chicago Blackhawks	5	1931, 1968, 1971, **1972**, 1973	24	1–4	.200
Detroit Red Wings	5	**1933**, 1937, 1941, 1948, 1950	23	1–4	.200
Carolina Hurricanes	3	2020, **2022**, **2024**	16	2–1	.667
Los Angeles Kings	3	**1979**, **1981**, 2014	11	2–1	.667
Florida Panthers	2	**1997**, 2024	11	1–1	.500
New York Americans	2	**1929**, 1938	5	1–1	.500
Ottawa Senators	2	**2012**, 2017	13	1–1	.500
Buffalo Sabres	2	1978, 2007	9	0–2	.000
Tampa Bay Lightning	2	2015, 2022	13	0–2	.000
Calgary Flames	1	**1980**	4	1–0	1.000
Colorado Avalanche	1	**1995**	6	1–0	1.000
Ottawa Senators (original)	1	**1930**	2	1–0	1.000
Pittsburgh Pirates	1	**1928**	2	1–0	1.000
St. Louis Blues	1	**1981**	6	1–0	1.000
Vancouver Canucks	1	**1994**	7	1–0	1.000
Winnipeg Jets	1	**2007**	4	1–0	1.000
Totals	116		561	57–59	.491

== Ottawa Senators ==
Opponent	S	Occurrences	GP	Rec	%
Pittsburgh Penguins	5	**2007**, 2008, 2010, 2013, 2017	27	1–4	.200
Toronto Maple Leafs	5	2000, 2001, 2002, 2004, 2025	30	0–5	.000
Buffalo Sabres	4	1997, 1999, 2006, **2007**	21	1–3	.250
New Jersey Devils	3	**1998**, 2003, **2007**	18	2–1	.667
Philadelphia Flyers	2	**2002**, **2003**	11	2–0	1.000
Montreal Canadiens	2	**2013**, 2015	11	1–1	.500
New York Rangers	2	2012, **2017**	13	1–1	.500
Boston Bruins	1	**2017**	6	1–0	1.000
New York Islanders	1	**2003**	5	1–0	1.000
Tampa Bay Lightning	1	**2006**	5	1–0	1.000
Anaheim Ducks	1	2007	5	0–1	.000
Carolina Hurricanes	1	2026	4	0–1	.000
Washington Capitals	1	1998	5	0–1	.000
Totals	29		161	11–18	.379

== Philadelphia Flyers ==
Opponent	S	Occurrences	GP	Rec	%
New York Rangers	11	**1974**, 1979, **1980**, 1982, 1983, **1985**, 1986, **1987**, **1995**, **1997**, 2014	54	6–5	.545
Buffalo Sabres	9	**1975**, **1978**, **1995**, **1997**, 1998, **2000**, 2001, 2006, **2011**	50	6–3	.667
Pittsburgh Penguins	8	**1989**, **1997**, **2000**, 2008, 2009, **2012**, 2018, **2026**	47	5–3	.625
Montreal Canadiens	7	1973, 1976, **1987**, 1989, **2008**, **2010**, **2020**	37	4–3	.571
Toronto Maple Leafs	6	**1975**, **1976**, **1977**, 1999, **2003**, **2004**	36	5–1	.833
Boston Bruins	6	**1974**, **1976**, 1977, 1978, **2010**, 2011	32	3–3	.500
New Jersey Devils	6	**1978**, 1995, 2000, **2004**, **2010**, 2012	30	3–3	.500
New York Islanders	5	**1975**, 1980, **1985**, **1987**, 2020	32	3–2	.600
Washington Capitals	5	1984, 1988, **1989**, **2008**, 2016	30	2–3	.400
Edmonton Oilers	3	**1980**, 1985, 1987	15	1–2	.333
Colorado Avalanche	2	**1981**, **1985**	11	2–0	1.000
Dallas Stars	2	**1973**, **1980**	11	2–0	1.000
Calgary Flames	2	**1974**, 1981	11	1–1	.500
Tampa Bay Lightning	2	**1996**, 2004	14	1–1	.500
Chicago Blackhawks	2	1971, 2010	10	0–2	.000
Ottawa Senators	2	2002, 2003	11	0–2	.000
St. Louis Blues	2	1968, 1969	11	0–2	.000
Vancouver Canucks	1	**1979**	3	1–0	1.000
Carolina Hurricanes	1	2026	4	0–1	.000
Detroit Red Wings	1	1997	4	0–1	.000
Florida Panthers	1	1996	6	0–1	.000
Totals (Note: Games played totals against Boston, Tampa Bay and Washington include one round-robin game from the 2020 Stanley Cup playoffs. As these games were played only to determine playoff seeding, they are not considered to be a complete series and are not counted in the occurrences section or the total series win–loss records.)	84		459	45–39	.536

== Pittsburgh Penguins ==
Opponent	S	Occurrences	GP	Rec	%
Washington Capitals	11	**1991**, **1992**, 1994, **1995**, **1996**, **2000**, **2001**, **2009**, **2016**, **2017**, 2018	68	9–2	.818
New York Rangers	8	**1989**, **1992**, **1996**, **2008**, 2014, 2015, **2016**, 2022	44	5–3	.625
Philadelphia Flyers	8	1989, 1997, 2000, **2008**, **2009**, 2012, **2018**, 2026	47	3–5	.375
New York Islanders	6	1975, 1982, 1993, **2013**, 2019, 2021	35	1–5	.167
Ottawa Senators	5	2007, **2008**, **2010**, **2013**, **2017**	27	4–1	.800
New Jersey Devils	5	**1991**, **1993**, 1995, **1999**, 2001	29	3–2	.600
Boston Bruins	5	1979, 1980, **1991**, **1992**, 2013	23	2–3	.400
St. Louis Blues	3	1970, **1975**, 1981	13	1–2	.333
Montreal Canadiens	3	1998, 2010, 2020	17	0–3	.000
Toronto Maple Leafs	3	1976, 1977, 1999	12	0–3	.000
Buffalo Sabres	2	**1979**, **2001**	10	2–0	1.000
Columbus Blue Jackets	2	**2014**, **2017**	11	2–0	1.000
Chicago Blackhawks	2	1972, **1992**	8	1–1	.500
Detroit Red Wings	2	2008, **2009**	13	1–1	.500
Tampa Bay Lightning	2	2011, **2016**	14	1–1	.500
California Golden Seals	1	**1970**	4	1–0	1.000
Carolina Hurricanes	1	**2009**	4	1–0	1.000
Dallas Stars	1	**1991**	6	1–0	1.000
Nashville Predators	1	**2017**	6	1–0	1.000
San Jose Sharks	1	**2016**	6	1–0	1.000
Florida Panthers	1	1996	7	0–1	.000
Totals	73		404	40–33	.548

== St. Louis Blues ==
Opponent	S	Occurrences	GP	Rec	%
Dallas Stars	14	**1968**, **1970**, 1971, **1972**, 1984, 1985, **1986**, **1989**, 1991, 1994, 1999, **2001**, **2016**, **2019**	81	8–6	.571
Chicago Blackhawks	12	1973, 1980, 1982, 1983, **1988**, 1989, 1990, 1992, **1993**, **2002**, 2014, **2016**	63	4–8	.333
Detroit Red Wings	7	**1984**, 1988, **1991**, 1996, 1997, 1998, 2002	40	2–5	.286
San Jose Sharks	6	2000, **2001**, 2004, **2012**, 2016, **2019**	35	3–3	.500
Toronto Maple Leafs	5	**1986**, 1987, **1990**, 1993, **1996**	31	3–2	.600
Los Angeles Kings	4	**1969**, **1998**, 2012, 2013	18	2–2	.500
Vancouver Canucks	4	1995, 2003, 2009, 2020	24	0–4	.000
Minnesota Wild	3	2015, **2017**, **2022**	17	2–1	.667
Pittsburgh Penguins	3	**1970**, 1975, **1981**	13	2–1	.667
Winnipeg Jets	3	**1982**, **2019**, 2025	17	2–1	.667
Boston Bruins	3	1970, 1972, **2019**	15	1–2	.333
Colorado Avalanche	3	2001, 2021, 2022	16	0–3	.000
Montreal Canadiens	3	1968, 1969, 1977	12	0–3	.000
Philadelphia Flyers	2	**1968**, **1969**	11	2–0	1.000
Arizona Coyotes	1	**1999**	7	1–0	1.000
Buffalo Sabres	1	1976	3	0–1	.000
Calgary Flames	1	1986	7	0–1	.000
Nashville Predators	1	2017	6	0–1	.000
New York Rangers	1	1981	6	0–1	.000
Vegas Golden Knights	0		1	0–0	.000
Totals (Note: Games played totals against Colorado, Dallas and Vegas include one round-robin game from the 2020 Stanley Cup playoffs. As these games were played only to determine playoff seeding, they are not considered to be a complete series and are not counted in the occurrences section or the total series win–loss records.)	77		423	32–45	.416

== San Jose Sharks ==
Opponent	S	Occurrences	GP	Rec	%
St. Louis Blues	6	**2000**, 2001, **2004**, 2012, **2016**, 2019	35	3–3	.500
Colorado Avalanche	5	1999, 2002, **2004**, **2010**, **2019**	32	3–2	.600
Detroit Red Wings	5	**1994**, 1995, 2007, **2010**, **2011**	29	3–2	.600
Los Angeles Kings	4	**2011**, 2013, 2014, **2016**	25	2–2	.500
Nashville Predators	3	**2006**, **2007**, **2016**	17	3–0	1.000
Calgary Flames	3	**1995**, 2004, **2008**	20	2–1	.667
Dallas Stars	3	1998, 2000, 2008	17	0–3	.000
Anaheim Ducks	2	2009, **2018**	10	1–1	.500
Vancouver Canucks	2	2011, **2013**	9	1–1	.500
Vegas Golden Knights	2	2018, **2019**	13	1–1	.500
Edmonton Oilers	2	2006, 2017	12	0–2	.000
Arizona Coyotes	1	**2002**	5	1–0	1.000
Chicago Blackhawks	1	2010	4	0–1	.000
Pittsburgh Penguins	1	2016	6	0–1	.000
Toronto Maple Leafs	1	1994	7	0–1	.000
Totals	41		241	20–21	.489

== Seattle Kraken ==
Opponent	S	Occurrences	GP	Rec	%
Colorado Avalanche	1	**2023**	7	1–0	1.000
Dallas Stars	1	2023	7	0–1	.000
Totals	2		14	1–1	.500

== Tampa Bay Lightning ==
Opponent	S	Occurrences	GP	Rec	%
Montreal Canadiens	5	**2004**, 2014, **2015**, **2021**, 2026	26	3–2	.600
New York Islanders	4	**2004**, **2016**, **2020**, **2021**	23	4–0	1.000
Florida Panthers	4	**2021**, **2022**, 2024, 2025	20	2–2	.500
Boston Bruins	3	2011, **2018**, **2020**	18	2–1	.667
Washington Capitals	3	**2003**, **2011**, 2018	18	2–1	.667
New Jersey Devils	3	2003, 2007, **2018**	16	1–2	.333
Detroit Red Wings	2	**2015**, **2016**	12	2–0	1.000
New York Rangers	2	**2015**, **2022**	13	2–0	1.000
Columbus Blue Jackets	2	2019, **2020**	9	1–1	.500
Philadelphia Flyers	2	1996, **2004**	14	1–1	.500
Pittsburgh Penguins	2	**2011**, 2016	14	1–1	.500
Toronto Maple Leafs	2	**2022**, 2023	13	1–1	.500
Calgary Flames	1	**2004**	7	1–0	1.000
Carolina Hurricanes	1	**2021**	5	1–0	1.000
Dallas Stars	1	**2020**	6	1–0	1.000
Chicago Blackhawks	1	2015	6	0–1	.000
Colorado Avalanche	1	2022	6	0–1	.000
Ottawa Senators	1	2006	5	0–1	.000
Totals (Note: Games played totals against Boston, Philadelphia and Washington include one round-robin game from the 2020 Stanley Cup playoffs. As these games were played only to determine playoff seeding, they are not considered to be a complete series and are not counted in the occurrences section or the total series win–loss records.)	40		231	25–15	.625

== Toronto Maple Leafs ==
Opponent	S	Occurrences	GP	Rec	%
Detroit Red Wings	23	**1929**, 1934, 1936, **1939**, **1940**, **1942**, 1943, **1945**, **1947**, **1948**, **1949**, 1950, 1952, 1954, 1955, 1956, **1960**, 1961, **1963**, **1964**, 1987, 1988, **1993**	117	12–11	.522
Boston Bruins	17	**1933**, **1935**, **1936**, **1938**, 1939, 1941, **1948**, **1949**, **1951**, **1959**, 1969, 1972, 1974, 2013, 2018, 2019, 2024	90	8–9	.471
Montreal Canadiens	16	**1918**, 1925, 1944, **1945**, **1947**, **1951**, 1959, 1960, **1963**, **1964**, 1965, 1966, **1967**, 1978, 1979, 2021	78	7–9	.438
Chicago Blackhawks	9	1931, **1932**, 1938, **1940**, **1962**, **1967**, **1986**, **1994**, 1995	38	6–3	.667
New York Rangers	8	1929, **1932**, 1933, 1937, 1940, **1942**, **1962**, 1971	35	3–5	.375
Philadelphia Flyers	6	1975, 1976, 1977, **1999**, 2003, 2004	36	1–5	.167
Ottawa Senators	5	**2000**, **2001**, **2002**, **2004**, **2025**	30	5–0	1.000
St. Louis Blues	5	1986, **1987**, 1990, **1993**, 1996	31	2–3	.400
Pittsburgh Penguins	3	**1976**, **1977**, **1999**	12	3–0	1.000
Los Angeles Kings	3	**1975**, **1978**, 1993	12	2–1	.667
New York Islanders	3	**1978**, 1981, **2002**	17	2–1	.667
New York Americans	2	**1936**, **1939**	5	2–0	1.000
Montreal Maroons	2	**1932**, 1935	5	1–1	.500
Ottawa Senators (original)	2	1921, **1922**	4	1–1	.500
Tampa Bay Lightning	2	2022, **2023**	13	1–1	.500
Dallas Stars	2	1980, 1983	7	0–2	.000
Florida Panthers	2	2023, 2025	12	0–2	.000
New Jersey Devils	2	2000, 2001	13	0–2	.000
Calgary Flames	1	**1979**	2	1–0	1.000
San Jose Sharks	1	**1994**	7	1–0	1.000
Buffalo Sabres	1	1999	5	0–1	.000
Carolina Hurricanes	1	2002	6	0–1	.000
Columbus Blue Jackets	1	2020	5	0–1	.000
Vancouver Canucks	1	1994	5	0–1	.000
Washington Capitals	1	2017	6	0–1	.000
Totals (Note: Totals only include series and games played against NHL franchises and excludes two series and ten Stanley Cup Finals games played from 1918–1922.)	119		591	58–61	.487

== Utah Mammoth ==
Opponent	S	Occurrences	GP	Rec	%
Vegas Golden Knights	1	2026	6	0–1	.000
Totals	1		6	0–1	.000

== Vancouver Canucks ==
Opponent	S	Occurrences	GP	Rec	%
Calgary Flames	7	**1982**, 1983, 1984, 1989, **1994**, 2004, 2015	38	2–5	.286
Chicago Blackhawks	5	**1982**, 1995, 2009, 2010, **2011**	28	2–3	.400
Los Angeles Kings	5	**1982**, 1991, 1993, **2010**, 2012	28	2–3	.400
St. Louis Blues	4	**1995**, **2003**, **2009**, **2020**	24	4–0	1.000
Edmonton Oilers	3	1986, 1992, 2024	16	0–3	.000
Winnipeg Jets	2	**1992**, **1993**	13	2–0	1.000
Dallas Stars	2	**1994**, **2007**	12	2–0	1.000
Minnesota Wild	2	2003, **2020**	11	1–1	.500
Nashville Predators	2	**2011**, **2024**	12	2–0	1.000
San Jose Sharks	2	**2011**, 2013	9	1–1	.500
Buffalo Sabres	2	1980, 1981	7	0–2	.000
Colorado Avalanche	2	1996, 2001	10	0–2	.000
New York Islanders	2	1976, 1982	6	0–2	.000
Toronto Maple Leafs	1	**1994**	5	1–0	1.000
Anaheim Ducks	1	2007	5	0–1	.000
Boston Bruins	1	2011	7	0–1	.000
Detroit Red Wings	1	2002	6	0–1	.000
Montreal Canadiens	1	1975	5	0–1	.000
New York Rangers	1	1994	7	0–1	.000
Philadelphia Flyers	1	1979	3	0–1	.000
Vegas Golden Knights	1	2020	7	0–1	.000
Totals	48		259	19–29	.396

== Vegas Golden Knights ==
Opponent	S	Occurrences	GP	Rec	%
Dallas Stars	3	2020, **2023**, 2024	19	1–2	.333
Colorado Avalanche	2	**2021**, **2026**	11	2–0	1.000
Minnesota Wild	2	**2021**, **2025**	13	2–0	1.000
Winnipeg Jets	2	**2018**, **2023**	10	2–0	1.000
Edmonton Oilers	2	**2023**, 2025	11	1–1	.500
San Jose Sharks	2	**2018**, 2019	13	1–1	.500
Anaheim Ducks	1	**2026**	6	1–0	1.000
Chicago Blackhawks	1	**2020**	5	1–0	1.000
Florida Panthers	1	**2023**	5	1–0	1.000
Los Angeles Kings	1	**2018**	4	1–0	1.000
Utah Mammoth	1	**2026**	6	1–0	1.000
Vancouver Canucks	1	**2020**	7	1–0	1.000
Carolina Hurricanes	1	2026	6	0–1	.000
Montreal Canadiens	1	2021	6	0–1	.000
Washington Capitals	1	2018	5	0–1	.000
St. Louis Blues	0		1	0–0	.000
Totals (Note: Games played totals against Colorado, Dallas and St. Louis include one round-robin game from the 2020 Stanley Cup playoffs. As these games were played only to determine playoff seeding, they are not considered to be a complete series and are not counted in the occurrences section or the total series win–loss records.)	22		128	15–7	.682

== Washington Capitals ==
Opponent	S	Occurrences	GP	Rec	%
Pittsburgh Penguins	11	1991, 1992, **1994**, 1995, 1996, 2000, 2001, 2009, 2016, 2017, **2018**	68	2–9	.182
New York Rangers	10	1986, **1990**, **1991**, 1994, **2009**, **2011**, 2012, 2013, 2015, 2024	59	4–6	.400
New York Islanders	8	1983, 1984, 1985, **1986**, 1987, 1993, **2015**, 2020	42	2–6	.250
Philadelphia Flyers	5	**1984**, **1988**, 1989, 2008, **2016**	30	3–2	.600
Boston Bruins	4	1990, **1998**, **2012**, 2021	23	2–2	.500
Tampa Bay Lightning	3	2003, 2011, **2018**	18	1–2	.333
Montreal Canadiens	2	2010, **2025**	12	1–1	.500
New Jersey Devils	2	1988, **1990**	13	1–1	.500
Carolina Hurricanes	2	2019, 2025	12	0–2	.000
Buffalo Sabres	1	**1998**	6	1–0	1.000
Columbus Blue Jackets	1	**2018**	6	1–0	1.000
Ottawa Senators	1	**1998**	5	1–0	1.000
Toronto Maple Leafs	1	**2017**	6	1–0	1.000
Vegas Golden Knights	1	**2018**	5	1–0	1.000
Detroit Red Wings	1	1998	4	0–1	.000
Florida Panthers	1	2022	6	0–1	.000
Totals (Note: Games played totals against Boston, Philadelphia and Tampa Bay include one round-robin game from the 2020 Stanley Cup playoffs. As these games were played only to determine playoff seeding, they are not considered to be a complete series and are not counted in the occurrences section or the total series win–loss records.)	54		315	21–33	.389

== Winnipeg Jets ==
Opponent	S	Occurrences	GP	Rec	%
Edmonton Oilers	7	1983, 1984, 1985, 1987, 1988, 1990, **2021**	30	1–6	.143
Calgary Flames	4	**1985**, 1986, **1987**, 2020	17	2–2	.500
St. Louis Blues	3	1982, 2019, **2025**	17	1–2	.333
Vancouver Canucks	2	1992, 1993	13	0–2	.000
Vegas Golden Knights	2	2018, 2023	10	0–2	.000
Minnesota Wild	1	**2018**	5	1–0	1.000
Nashville Predators	1	**2018**	7	1–0	1.000
Anaheim Ducks	1	2015	4	0–1	.000
Colorado Avalanche	1	2024	5	0–1	.000
Dallas Stars	1	2025	6	0–1	.000
Detroit Red Wings	1	1996	6	0–1	.000
Montreal Canadiens	1	2021	4	0–1	.000
New York Rangers	1	2007	4	0–1	.000
Totals	26		128	6–20	.231

== Defunct teams ==
=== Arizona Coyotes ===
Opponent	S	Occurrences	GP	Rec	%
Detroit Red Wings	3	1998, 2010, 2011	17	0–3	.000
Nashville Predators	2	**2012**, **2020**	9	2–0	1.000
Colorado Avalanche	2	2000, 2020	10	0–2	.000
Chicago Blackhawks	1	**2012**	6	1–0	1.000
Anaheim Ducks	1	1997	7	0–1	.000
Los Angeles Kings	1	2012	5	0–1	.000
San Jose Sharks	1	2002	5	0–1	.000
St. Louis Blues	1	1999	7	0–1	.000
Totals	12		66	3–9	.250

=== California Golden Seals ===
Opponent	S	Occurrences	GP	Rec	%
Los Angeles Kings	1	1969	7	0–1	.000
Pittsburgh Penguins	1	1970	4	0–1	.000
Totals	2		11	0–2	.000

=== Montreal Maroons ===
Opponent	S	Occurrences	GP	Rec	%
New York Rangers	5	1928, 1931, **1934**, **1935**, 1937	13	2–3	.400
Detroit Red Wings	3	**1932**, 1933, 1936	7	1–2	.333
Ottawa Senators (original)	2	**1926**, **1928**	4	2–0	1.000
Boston Bruins	2	1930, **1937**	7	1–1	.500
Chicago Blackhawks	2	1934, **1935**	4	1–1	.500
Montreal Canadiens	2	1927, **1928**	4	1–1	.500
Toronto Maple Leafs	2	1932, **1935**	5	1–1	.500
Pittsburgh Pirates	1	**1926**	2	1–0	1.000
Totals	19		46	10–9	.526

=== New York Americans ===
Opponent	S	Occurrences	GP	Rec	%
Chicago Blackhawks	2	**1936**, 1938	5	1–1	.500
New York Rangers	2	1929, **1938**	5	1–1	.500
Toronto Maple Leafs	2	1936, 1939	5	0–2	.000
Detroit Red Wings	1	1940	3	0–1	.000
Totals	7		18	2–5	.286

=== Ottawa Senators (original) ===
Opponent	S	Occurrences	GP	Rec	%
Montreal Canadiens	4	1919, **1923**, 1924, **1927**	11	2–2	.500
Toronto Maple Leafs	2	**1921**, 1922	4	1–1	.500
Montreal Maroons	2	1926, 1928	4	0–2	.000
Boston Bruins	1	**1927**	4	1–0	1.000
New York Rangers	1	1930	2	0–1	.000
Totals (Note: Totals only include series and games played against NHL franchises and excludes four series victories and 16 playoff games; including 12 Stanley Cup Finals games played from 1920–1923.)	10		25	4–6	.400

=== Pittsburgh Pirates ===
Opponent	S	Occurrences	GP	Rec	%
Montreal Maroons	1	1926	2	0–1	.000
New York Rangers	1	1928	2	0–1	.000
Totals	2		4	0–2	.000

== Most frequent NHL playoff series ==
This is a list of the most frequent NHL playoff series.

Rank	Total	Team	Record	Team	Last occurrence
1.	34	Montreal Canadiens	25–9	Boston Bruins	2014
2.	23	Toronto Maple Leafs	12–11	Detroit Red Wings	1993
3.	17	Montreal Canadiens	12–5	Chicago Blackhawks	1976
3.	17	Boston Bruins	9–8	Toronto Maple Leafs	2024
5.	16	Montreal Canadiens	9–7	Toronto Maple Leafs	2021
5.	16	New York Rangers	9–7	Montreal Canadiens	2017
5.	16	Chicago Blackhawks	9–7	Detroit Red Wings	2013
8.	14 (Note: Nine series between St. Louis-Minnesota (5–4 St. Louis), five between St. Louis-Dallas (3–2 St. Louis))	St. Louis Blues	8–6	Dallas Stars	2019
9.	12	Chicago Blackhawks	8–4	St. Louis Blues	2016
9.	12	Detroit Red Wings	7–5	Montreal Canadiens	1978
11.	11	Edmonton Oilers	9–2	Los Angeles Kings	2025
11.	11	Pittsburgh Penguins	9–2	Washington Capitals	2018
11.	11	Philadelphia Flyers	6–5	New York Rangers	2014
14.	10	Boston Bruins	7–3	New York Rangers	2013
14.	10 (Note: Two series between Minnesota-Edmonton (both 1–1), eight between Dallas-Edmonton (5–3 Dallas))	Dallas Stars	6–4	Edmonton Oilers	2025
14.	10	New York Rangers	6–4	Washington Capitals	2024
17.	9	Boston Bruins	6–3	Buffalo Sabres	2026
17.	9	Philadelphia Flyers	6–3	Buffalo Sabres	2011
17.	9	Toronto Maple Leafs	6–3	Chicago Blackhawks	1995
20.	8	New York Islanders	6–2	Washington Capitals	2020
20.	8	Montreal Canadiens	5–3	Buffalo Sabres	2026
20.	8	Montreal Canadiens	5–3	Carolina Hurricanes	2026
20.	8	Philadelphia Flyers	5–3	Pittsburgh Penguins	2026
20.	8	Pittsburgh Penguins	5–3	New York Rangers	2022
20.	8	Boston Bruins	5–3	Detroit Red Wings	2014
20.	8	New York Islanders	5–3	New York Rangers	1994
20.	8	New York Rangers	5–3	Toronto Maple Leafs	1971

== See also ==
- List of MLB postseason series
- List of NBA playoff series
- List of NFL playoff games
- List of WNBA playoff series
