= NHL playoff ties =

Hockey games with no winner

Except for 1920, the NHL has always used a playoff tournament to determine its champion. The league's playoff system has changed over the years, from the NHL's inception in 1917, to when the NHL took over the Cup in 1926, to the current setup today.

Current rules require overtime for playoff games that are tied after regulation, however that was not always the case. Game 4 of the 1988 Stanley Cup Final between the Edmonton Oilers and the Boston Bruins was abandoned after 36:37 of play, but this game is not considered official except for player statistics.

Starting in 1915, the Cup was officially contested between the champion of the National Hockey Association (NHA) and the champion of the Pacific Coast Hockey Association (PCHA). After a series of league mergers and folds, including the 1917 establishment of the NHL as a successor to the NHA, the Stanley Cup became the championship trophy of the NHL prior to the 1926–27 season, so in this period, there were Stanley Cup Final games between the NHL and other leagues during this period.

== History ==
=== Emergence of the NHL ===
The National Hockey League (NHL) was founded in November 1917 as a successor to the NHA. From the NHL's inception until 1920, both NHL and PCHA teams were eligible for the Stanley Cup. The NHL finals was a two-game total goals series in 1918 and a best-of-seven series in 1919. In 1920, the Ottawa Senators were automatically declared the league champion when the team had won both halves of the regular season. The two halves format was abandoned the next year, and the top two teams faced off for the NHL championship in a two-game total goals series.

At the time, the NHL champion would later face the winners of the PCHA and, from 1921, the Western Canada Hockey League (WCHL) in further rounds in order to determine the Stanley Cup champion. During this time, as the rules of the NHL and those of the western leagues differ (the main difference being that NHL rules allowed five skaters while the western leagues allowed six), the rules for each game in the Stanley Cup Final alternated between those of the NHL and the western leagues. Before the WCHL competed for the Stanley Cup, the Cup championship series was a best-of-five series. Following the involvement of the WCHL, one league champion was given a bye straight to the finals (a best-of-three affair starting in 1922), while the other two competed in a best-of-three semifinal. As travel expenses were high during these times, it was often the case that the NHL champions were sent west to compete. In a dispute between the leagues in 1923 about whether to send one or both western league champions east, the winner of the PCHA/WCHL series would proceed to the Stanley Cup Final, while the loser of the series would face the NHL champion, both series being best-of-three.

In 1924, the NHL playoffs expanded from two to three teams (with the top team getting a bye to the two-game total goal NHL finals), but because the first-place Hamilton Tigers refused to play under this format, the second and third place teams played for the NHL championship in a two-game total goals affair. The Stanley Cup Final series returned to a best-of-five format the same year.

=== NHL takes control of Stanley Cup ===
With the merger of the PCHA and WCHL in 1925 and the merged league's collapse in 1926, the NHL took de facto control of the Stanley Cup. While the Cup would not be formally deeded to the league until 1947, from 1926 onward the NHL playoffs and the Stanley Cup playoffs are considered synonymous. The NHL was subsequently divided into the Canadian and American divisions for the 1927–28 season. For 1927, six teams qualified for the playoffs, three from each division, with the division semifinals and finals being a two-game total goals affair, and the Stanley Cup Final becoming a best-of-five series. 1927 also saw the introduction of overtime and a reduction in the number of potential ties in "best of" series. In 1928, the playoff format was changed so that the two teams with identical division ranking would face each other (i.e., the division winners played each other, the second place teams play each other, and likewise for the third place teams). The first place series was a best-of-five affair, with the winner proceeding to the best-of-three Stanley Cup Final, while the others were a two-game total goals series. The winner of the second and third place series played each other in a best-of-three series, with the winner earning the other berth to the Stanley Cup Final. This format had a slight modification the following year, where the semifinal series became a two-game total goals affair and the Stanley Cup Final became a best-of-five series. The two-game total goals format was abolished in 1937, with those series being changed to best-of-three affairs.

The 1951 playoffs saw the last tie in NHL playoff history when the Boston Bruins and the Toronto Maple Leafs ended game 2 of the 1951 Stanley Cup Final ahead of the Sunday curfew in Toronto.

== Table key ==
Key of colours and symbols
Colour	Explanation
	series winner

=== NHL playoff ties ===
Year	Date	Away team	Home team	Result	Series	Game	Notes
1919	March 26, 1919	Montreal Canadiens (Note: Original Six team)	Seattle Metropolitans (PCHA)	0–0	Stanley Cup Final	4	2 overtime periods of 10 minutes played, best of 5 series with no winner after 5 due to 1918 influenza pandemic
1922	March 13, 1922	Toronto St. Patricks	Ottawa Senators	0–0	NHL Finals	2	2 game total goals series
1926	March 23, 1926	Pittsburgh Pirates	Montreal Maroons	3–3	Semifinals	2	2 game total goals series
1926	March 25, 1926	Ottawa Senators	Montreal Maroons	1–1	NHL Finals	1	2 game total goals series
1927	March 29, 1927	Montreal Canadiens	Montreal Maroons	1–1	Quarterfinals	1	2 game total goals series, both teams played in the Montreal Forum
1927	March 31, 1927	Chicago Black Hawks	Boston Bruins	4–4	Quarterfinals	2	2 game total goals series
1927	April 2, 1927	New York Rangers	Boston Bruins	0–0	Semifinals	1	2 game total goals series
1927	April 4, 1927	Montreal Canadiens	Ottawa Senators	1–1	Semifinals	2	2 game total goals series
1927	April 7, 1927	Ottawa Senators	Boston Bruins	0–0	Stanley Cup Final	1	2 overtime periods of 10 minutes played
1927	April 11, 1927	Boston Bruins	Ottawa Senators	1–1	Stanley Cup Final	3	2 overtime periods of 10 minutes played
1928	March 31, 1928	Boston Bruins	New York Rangers	1–1	Semifinals	1	2 game total goals series
1928	March 31, 1928	Montreal Canadiens	Montreal Maroons	2–2	Semifinals	1	2 game total goals series, both teams played in the Montreal Forum
1929	March 19, 1929	New York Rangers	New York Americans	0–0	Quarterfinals	1	2 game total goals series, both teams played in Madison Square Garden
1930	March 20, 1930	New York Rangers	Ottawa Senators	1–1	Quarterfinals	1	2 game total goals series
1930	March 26, 1930	Chicago Black Hawks	Montreal Canadiens	2–2	Quarterfinals	2	2 game total goals series, Howie Morenz scores at 51:53 of overtime to win series (and tie game)
1931	March 24, 1931	Chicago Black Hawks	Toronto Maple Leafs	2–2	Quarterfinals	1	2 game total goals series
1932	March 27, 1932	Montreal Maroons	Detroit Falcons	1–1	Quarterfinals	1	2 game total goals series
1932	March 31, 1932	Toronto Maple Leafs	Montreal Maroons	1–1	Semifinals	1	2 game total goals series
1933	March 28, 1933	New York Rangers	Montreal Canadiens	3–3	Quarterfinals	2	2 game total goals series
1934	March 20, 1934	New York Rangers	Montreal Maroons	0–0	Quarterfinals	1	2 game total goals series
1934	March 25, 1934	Montreal Canadiens	Chicago Black Hawks	1–1	Quarterfinals	2	2 game total goals series, Mush Marsh scores at 11:05 of overtime to win series (and tie game)
1935	March 23, 1935	Chicago Black Hawks	Montreal Maroons	0–0	Quarterfinals	1	2 game total goals series
1935	March 26, 1935	New York Rangers	Montreal Canadiens	4–4	Quarterfinals	2	2 game total goals series
1935	March 26, 1935	New York Rangers	Montreal Maroons	3–3	Semifinals	2	2 game total goals series
1951	March 31, 1951	Boston Bruins	Toronto Maple Leafs	1–1	Semifinals	2	only 20 minutes of overtime played due to Sunday curfew in Toronto

== See also ==
- List of NHL playoff series
