= Canadiens–Maple Leafs rivalry =

National Hockey League rivalry

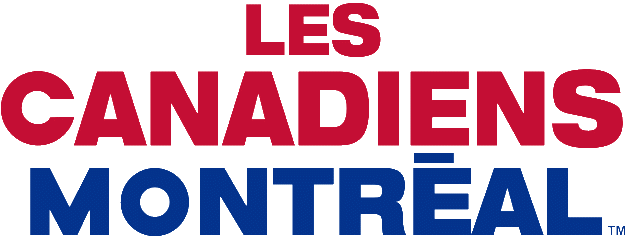
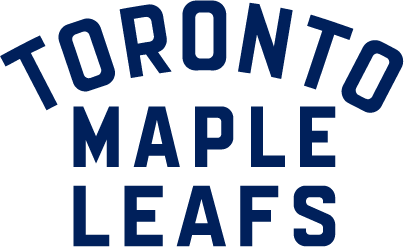
- Montreal Canadiens Toronto Maple Leafs
- First meeting: December 26, 1917
- Latest meeting: November 7, 2026
- Next meeting: December 26, 2026

Statistics
- Total meetings: 856
- All-time series: 418–336–88–14 (MTL)
- Regular season series: 372–304–88–14 (MTL)
- Postseason results: 46–32 (MTL)
- Largest victory: MTL 11–0 TOR; March 30, 1944
- Longest win streak: MTL W14
- Current win streak: MTL W5

Postseason history
- 1918 NHL championship: (Note: The NHL championship was a series from 1918 to 1926, whose winner was determined by the total number of goals scored. The winner of the NHL championship advanced to Stanley Cup Final. From 1914 to 1926, the Stanley Cup Final operated as a championship series for a number of professional hockey leagues in North America.) Toronto won, (Note: The Maple Leafs franchise did not have an official name for its first season of play, but were informally called "the Blueshirts," or "the Torontos" during the 1917–18 season.) 10–7; 1925 NHL championship: Canadiens won, 5–2; 1944 semifinals: Canadiens won, 4–1; 1945 semifinals: Maple Leafs won, 4–2; 1947 Stanley Cup Final: Maple Leafs won, 4–2; 1951 Stanley Cup Final: Maple Leafs won, 4–1; 1959 Stanley Cup Final: Canadiens won, 4–1; 1960 Stanley Cup Final: Canadiens won, 4–0; 1963 semifinals: Maple Leafs won, 4–1; 1964 semifinals: Maple Leafs won, 4–3; 1965 semifinals: Canadiens won, 4–2; 1966 semifinals: Canadiens won, 4–0; 1967 Stanley Cup Final: Maple Leafs won, 4–2; 1978 semifinals: Canadiens won, 4–0; 1979 quarterfinals: Canadiens won, 4–0; 2021 first round: Canadiens won, 4–3

The Canadiens–Maple Leafs rivalry is a National Hockey League (NHL) rivalry between the Montreal Canadiens and Toronto Maple Leafs. The Canadiens and Maple Leafs are the league's oldest teams, with the former established in 1909 and the latter in 1917. Both teams compete in the Atlantic Division of the Eastern Conference.

Though the Canadiens and Maple Leafs have played against each other from the inception of the league, the rivalry picked up after the Montreal Maroons folded in 1938, resulting in the Canadiens and Maple Leafs being the only Canadian-based teams in the NHL until 1970. Both teams saw success during the Original Six era, with either the Canadiens or Maple Leafs winning the Stanley Cup in 19 out of 25 seasons. The rivalry was exacerbated by societal issues in mid-20th century Canada, as the two clubs became emblematic of a variety of cultural dualities in Canadian society, with the Canadiens representing French-speaking Canada and the Maple Leafs the English-speaking part of the country. The rivalry's association with larger societal issues in the country has left an imprint on Canadian culture, most notably through the publication of the short story The Hockey Sweater by Roch Carrier.

The Canadiens and Maple Leafs have met in 16 Stanley Cup playoffs series, including five Stanley Cup Final series. The rivalry has waned since the Original Six era, with the two squads playing in separate NHL conferences from 1981 to 1998 and not meeting each other in the playoffs from 1980 to 2020. Although the rivalry is no longer influenced by its historical associations, it remains symbolic of the relationship between the country's two largest cities, Toronto and Montreal.

== Background ==
The rivalry between Montreal and Toronto predates the foundation of either hockey club, with the two cities having been considered economic rivals since the mid-19th century, as well as cultural rivals from the mid-20th century. Toronto emerged as an economic rival to Montreal during the 1850s. Although Montreal remained the Province of Canada's largest city throughout that period, Toronto's population also began to grow significantly. In addition to being economic rivals, Montreal and Toronto's early identities were rooted in the cultural differences between the two cities. From its foundation, Montreal was historically viewed as Canada's cosmopolitan centre for culture; which contrasted Toronto's pre-World War era reputation as a small city and bastion for "Victorian morality". Following Canadian Confederation, the two cities had become obvious rivals for cultural and financial control of the "Canadian hinterland".

After the Second World War, Toronto began to eclipse Montreal as the "cultural gateway" to Canada for Americans; making it a potential cultural rival to Montreal. For the most part however, Toronto continued to be viewed as a provincial industrial city, subservient to Montreal in culture and finance until the 1960s. The financial situation would reverse by 1971, with Toronto having eclipsed Montreal as the financial capital of the country; and the population of the Greater Toronto Area overtaking Greater Montreal shortly afterwards.

=== Sports ===
The rivalry between the two cities eventually extended into sports, with rival national athletic sports bodies, the Toronto-based Canadian Amateur Athletic Union, and the Montreal-based Amateur Athletic Federation of Canada, fighting for control over amateur sports in the country during the early 20th century.

A dispute between Eddie Livingstone, the owner of the National Hockey Association's Toronto Blueshirts, and the other owners of the NHA, including the Montreal Canadiens owner George Kennedy led to the creation of the National Hockey League in 1917. Because the NHA's constitution prevented the disgruntled owners from expelling Livingstone, they opted to instead form a new professional hockey league; and voted to suspend NHA operations for the year. The resulting dispute led to the creation of the modern NHL, as well as the present hockey club in Toronto; with the new NHL owners opting to establish a hockey club in Toronto in an effort to maintain a four team circuit that included the Canadiens, Montreal Wanderers, and Ottawa Senators. A temporary franchise was awarded to the Arena Gardens of Toronto Ltd., which was later made permanent in October 1918.

== History ==
During the NHL's first 25 seasons, Montreal and Toronto had played in only two playoff series, during the 1918 NHL championship, and the 1925 NHL championship. The 1918 series saw Toronto win the first game of the series 7–3, and the Canadiens winning the second game of the series 4–3; with Canadiens' Harry Meeking scoring a hat trick during that game. Toronto advanced to win the 1918 Stanley Cup Final, as the two-game NHL championship series was determined by total goals scored.

The Canadiens won the second playoff series played between the two clubs, with the Canadiens outscoring the St. Patricks 5–2. Both series consist of two games, where the winner was determined by the total goals scored. The champions from both NHL championship series advanced to the Stanley Cup Final; which until 1926, operated as a championship series between top-tier professional hockey leagues in North America.

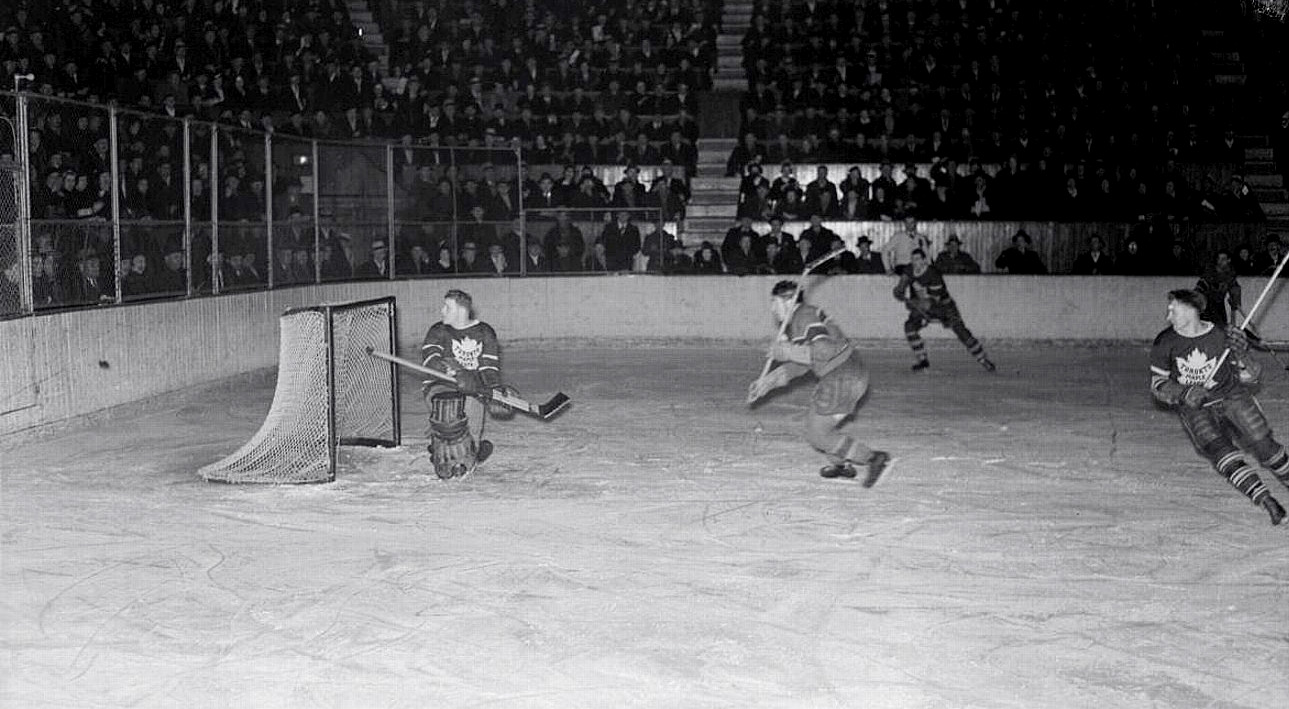
A game between the Canadiens and Maple Leafs in March 1938.

After the Montreal Maroons folded in 1938, the Canadiens and Maple Leafs remained the league's only remaining Canadian teams from 1938 to 1970; enabling both teams to accrue a number of fans across Canada as the only two NHL teams in the country.

=== Original Six era (1942–1967) ===
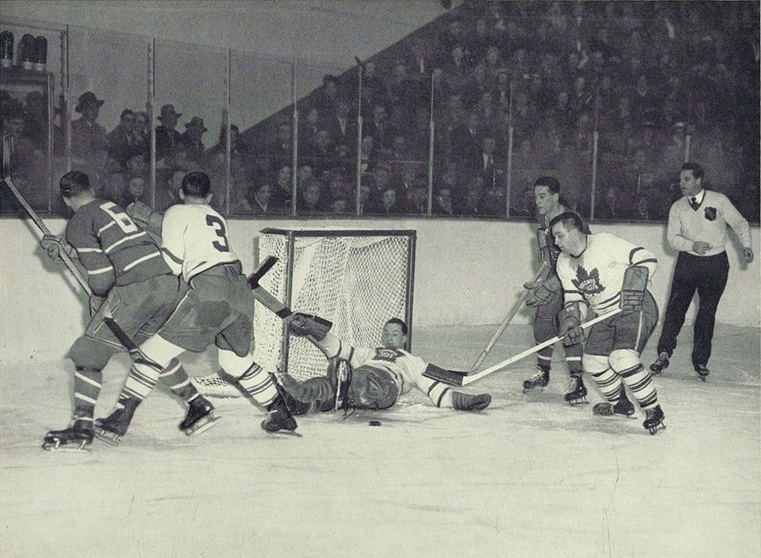
1951 Quaker Oats card of in-action shot of Montreal versus Toronto Maple Leafs; the players depicted from left to right: Floyd Curry, Gus Mortson, Al Rollins (goaltender), Dollard St. Laurent, and Bill Juzda.

The two teams played in 11 postseason series between 1944 and 1967. During the 1940s and the 1960s, the two teams reigned exclusively as Stanley Cup champions during the decade, except in 1961, when the Chicago Black Hawks won the championship. The rivalry between the two teams picked up in 1946, when assistant manager Frank J. Selke left the Maple Leafs to become the general manager of the Canadiens, having left the Maple Leafs organization partly due to ongoing tensions between himself and their managing director, Conn Smythe.

The rivalry perhaps reached its zenith in the 1967 Stanley Cup Final during the centennial year of Canadian Confederation, and the year Montreal was hosting Expo 67. An exhibit space had been prepared for the Stanley Cup at the expo's Quebec pavilion, as the heavily favored Canadiens were anticipated to beat the Leafs quite handily. However, underdog Toronto upset the Canadiens to capture their most recent Cup; the Leafs opted to exhibit the Stanley Cup at the expo's Ontario pavilion instead.

=== Expansion and modern era (1967–present) ===
The last two postseason series played between the two teams in the 20th century occurred during the 1978 and 1979 Stanley Cup playoffs, with the Canadiens sweeping the Maple Leafs both times en route to winning Stanley Cups in both years during their late 1970s dynasty (the Canadiens won four straight Stanley Cups from 1976 to 1979).

From 1981 to 1998, Toronto and Montreal were placed in opposite conferences, resulting in a "cooling" of the rivalry. The fortunes of the two teams since 1967 have also seen a marked difference; the Canadiens have won 10 Stanley Cup championships since that year, while the Maple Leafs have yet to reach the Stanley Cup Final. Toronto came close to reaching the Final in 1993, where they would have faced the Wales Conference champion Canadiens in the 100th anniversary year of the Stanley Cup. However, they were narrowly defeated in the Campbell Conference Final by the Los Angeles Kings. At the 1994 NHL All-Star Game in New York City the following January, however, the then-starting goaltenders of the two teams – Montreal's Patrick Roy and Toronto's Félix Potvin – were the starting goaltenders, Potvin substituting for future Maple Leafs goaltender Ed Belfour. The Eastern Conference, coached by the Canadiens' Jacques Demers, won the game, 9–8.

On May 29, 1992, Pat Burns resigned as the Canadiens head coach and was hired as the Maple Leafs head coach that same day, adding more fuel to the fire. Burns coached the Canadiens to the 1989 Stanley Cup Final, but lost to the Calgary Flames in six games. However, he would win the Stanley Cup as coach of the New Jersey Devils in 2003.

In 1998, the Leafs moved into the Eastern Conference's Northeast Division. This has served to rekindle the rivalry, although the two teams did not appear in a playoff series against each other until 2021. For the Maple Leafs, this realignment also put them in the same division as the Ottawa Senators, their in-province rivals.

==== 21st century ====
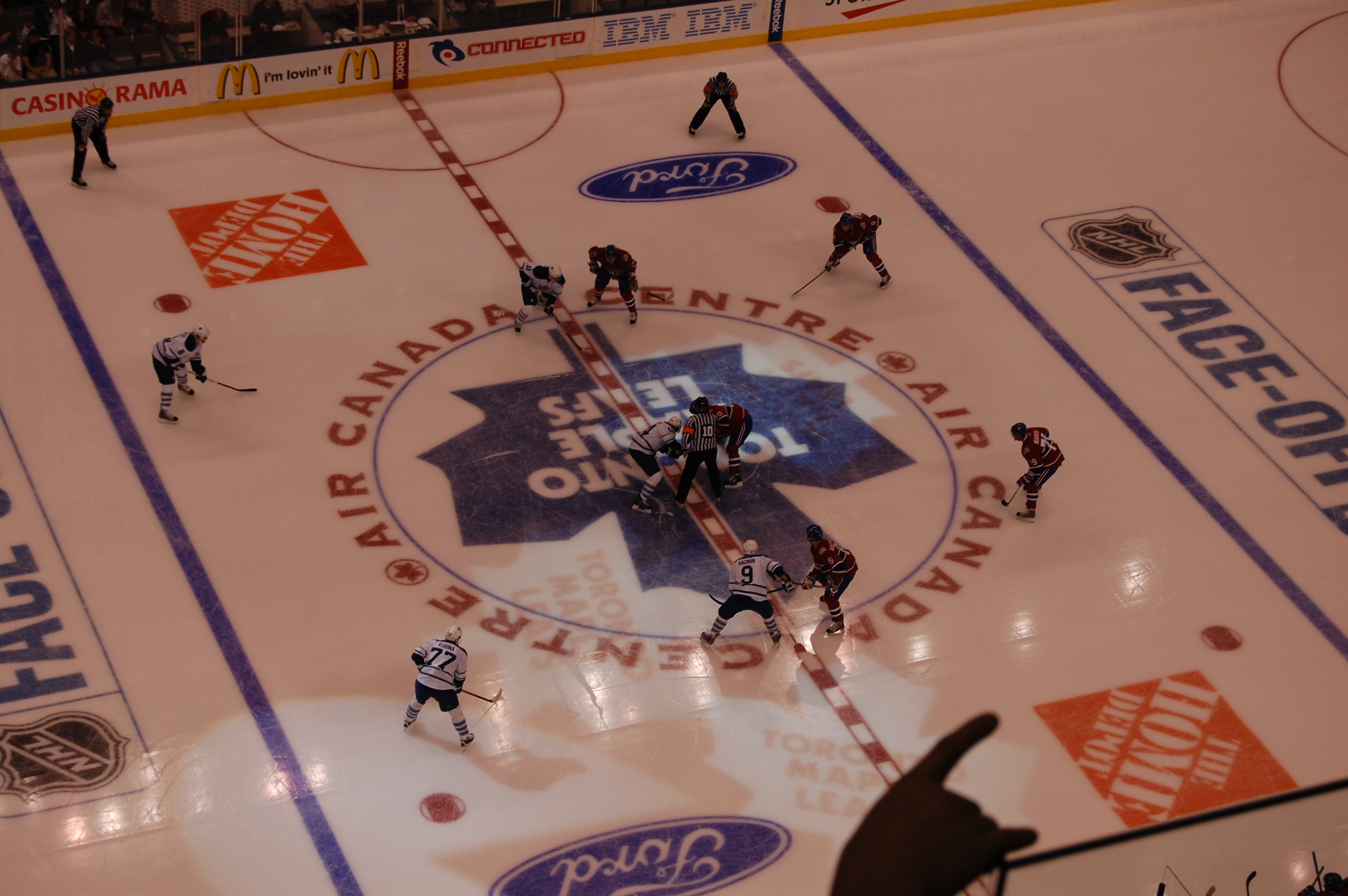
The Canadiens and Maple Leafs take a face-off to begin the 2008–09 season.

In the first decade of the 2000s, the two teams have eliminated the other from Stanley Cup playoffs contention on occasion; with the Canadiens eliminating the Maple Leafs from the playoffs during the 2005–06 season. In the 2006–07 season, both teams played their final game of that season against one another, with the two teams required to win in order to remain qualified for the 2007 Stanley Cup playoffs. The Maple Leafs won the game 6–5, eliminating the Canadiens from playoff contention; although the Maple Leafs were eliminated the following day after the New York Islanders beat the New Jersey Devils.

Another realignment in 2013 kept the Canadiens, Maple Leafs, and Senators in the same division, now going by the Atlantic Division name (the old Atlantic Division was renamed the Metropolitan Division). In 2014, an attempted trade between the Canadiens and Maple Leafs was blocked after Canadiens defenceman Josh Gorges refused to waive Toronto from his "no-trade list". When asked about his refusal to waive, Gorges commented that he "couldn’t be the same player that [he] was in Montreal in Toronto," as he could not play with "that same passion and heart for a team that, for eight years, was your most talked about rival".

On October 14, 2017, the Maple Leafs beat the Canadiens 4–3 in overtime, ending a record-breaking 14-game losing streak against their rivals dating back over three years to January 18, 2014. It was also their first win in Montreal in over four years, stretching back to October 1, 2013. This marked the first of seven straight wins against the Canadiens for the Maple Leafs, a streak broken when the Canadiens won 6–5 in a shootout, the final game of the 2018–19 season.

The Canadiens then won the first three matchups of the 2019–20 season before the season was cut short by the COVID-19 pandemic.

For the shortened 2020–21 season, the two teams played each other 10 times in the North Division as the NHL temporarily realigned the divisions due to the COVID-19 pandemic, the most meetings between the teams since the 1967–68 NHL season. The Maple Leafs won the season series 7–2–1, including wins over the Canadiens on April 28 to clinch a playoff berth and May 8 to clinch the North Division title. The Canadiens finished fourth in the division, setting up the teams' first playoff meeting since the Canadiens championship season of 1979, during their late-1970s dynasty. The two teams met in the first round, where game two became Toronto's first postseason victory over Montreal since game six of the 1967 Stanley Cup Final. Following a 4–0 win in game four, the Leafs led the series 3–1, but suffered two subsequent overtime losses in games five and six. The Canadiens ultimately won the best-of-seven matchup 4–3 with a 3–1 victory in game seven, and went all the way to the Stanley Cup Final for the first time since their 1993 championship season.

== Cultural impact ==
For the first two-thirds of the 20th century, professional ice hockey was viewed as one of the few "battlefields" in which French Canadians could excel against English-speaking Canadians. As a result, the Montreal Canadiens had developed rivalries with several hockey clubs, in which the teams were linked to larger class, linguistic, and religious divisions in the country. Prior to the Original Six era, the Canadiens had rivalries with the Montreal Wanderers (1903–1918) and the Montreal Maroons (1924–1938); francophone fans supported the Canadiens, while anglophone fans supported the latter two teams prior to their demise.

During the Original Six era, the rivalry between the Canadiens and Maple Leafs found itself linked to these societal issues, with the two teams representing a myriad of Canadian societal dualities. In addition to the cities and provinces the teams were based in, the Canadiens found themselves associated with French Canada and, to a lesser extent, with Roman Catholicism and les Patriotes. On the other hand, the Maple Leafs found themselves standing in for English-speaking Canada, as well as for Protestantism and the United Empire Loyalists. The rivalry has been called a "microcosm of Canadian society," given the two teams' association with the two solitudes of Canada. However, after the Quiet Revolution of the 1960s produced a more equitable society in Quebec and an improved economic situation for francophones, the Canadiens–Maple Leafs rivalry became less associated with these larger divisions. Moreover, after decades of net interprovincial migration from the Montreal area to the Toronto area, Canadiens fans became more visible in Toronto territory. A Toronto sports bar, Kilgour's, was known for many patrons supporting the Canadiens.

The fanbases of both teams began to erode somewhat following the Original Six era, as five other Canadian teams joined the league. In 1970, the NHL placed an expansion franchise in Vancouver (the Canucks). The league then absorbed three former World Hockey Association (WHA) clubs – the Edmonton Oilers, Quebec Nordiques, and original Winnipeg Jets – in 1979, and the Atlanta Flames moved to Calgary and became the Calgary Flames in 1980. The Nordiques would develop a heated rivalry with the Canadiens during the 1980s and early 1990s, known as the Battle of Quebec. The NHL added the Ottawa Senators via expansion in 1992, but the Nordiques and original Jets moved to the United States in the mid-1990s, becoming the Colorado Avalanche and Phoenix Coyotes, respectively. Winnipeg, however, received an NHL team back in 2011 when the Atlanta Thrashers moved to the city and became the second version of the Jets. Also, after increased NHL expansion into the U.S., the rivalry was sometimes softened by the phenomenon of many Canadians cheering for any Canadian team in a good position to "bring the Cup home" to Canada.

=== In popular culture ===
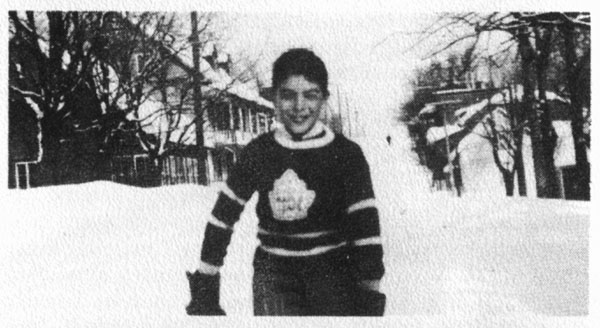
Roch Carrier at age 10, in a Maple Leafs sweater that served as the inspiration for The Hockey Sweater

The Canadiens–Maple Leafs rivalry is central to the children's book The Hockey Sweater, in which the protagonist, a Canadiens fan presumably based on author Roch Carrier as a child, is forced to wear a Leafs sweater. In 1980, the story was adapted into an animated short, The Sweater, by the National Film Board of Canada.

The rivalry is also featured in the murals of Toronto's College subway station, in a work by Charles Pachter called Hockey Knights in Canada. The two murals are installed appropriately in opposition, with one facing the other across the subway tracks. The mural of the Montreal Canadiens is on the northbound side of the station, while another mural of the Maple Leafs stands directly across from it on southbound side of the station. College station is the closest station to Maple Leaf Gardens, the Maple Leafs home arena from 1931 to 1999.

== See also ==
- List of NHL rivalries
- Canadian Classique
- Pearson Cup

== Bibliography ==
- Cole, Stephen (2004). The best of Hockey night in Canada. Toronto: McArthur. ISBN 1-55278-408-8.
- Holzman, Morey; Nieforth, Joseph (2002). Deceptions and Doublecross: How the NHL Conquered Hockey. Dundurn Press. ISBN 1-5500-2413-2.
- McKinley, Michael (2009). Hockey: A People's History. McClelland & Stewart. ISBN 9780771057717.
- Relph, Edward (2013). Toronto: Transformation in a City and Its Region. University of Pennsylvania Press. ISBN 978-0812209181.
- White, Randall (1996). Ontario 1610–1985. Dundurn. ISBN 9781554882557.
- Shea, Kevin; Wilson, Jason (2016). The Toronto Maple Leafs Hockey Club: The Official Centennial Publication. McClelland & Stewart. ISBN 978-0-7710-7929-0.
- Wiggins, David K.; Rogers, Pierre (2012). Rivals: Legendary Matchups That Made Sports History. University of Arkansas Press. ISBN 9781610753494.
