= Hal Winkler =

Canadian ice hockey player (1894–1956)

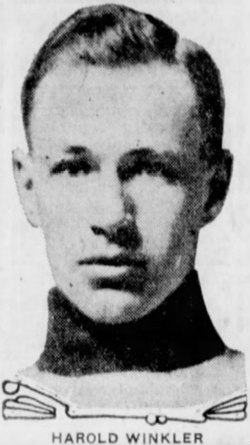
- Born: March 20, 1894 Gretna, Manitoba, Canada
- Died: May 29, 1956 (aged 62) Winnipeg, Manitoba, Canada
- Height: 5 ft 8 in (173 cm)
- Weight: 150 lb (68 kg; 10 st 10 lb)
- Position: Goaltender
- Caught: Left
- Played for: Edmonton Eskimos; Calgary Tigers; Boston Bruins; New York Rangers
- Playing career: 1921–1928

Harold Lang Winkler (March 20, 1894 – May 29, 1956) was a Canadian ice hockey goaltender. He played in the Western Canada Hockey League and National Hockey League between 1921 and 1928.

== Biography ==
Winkler started his professional hockey career with the Edmonton Eskimos of the Western Canada Hockey League in 1922. He would also play with the Calgary Tigers. In 1926, he moved to the New York Rangers of the National Hockey League. He would also play with the Boston Bruins who acquired him from the Rangers in a cash transaction on January 17, 1927.

According to Winkler's obituary in the May 31, 1956 edition of the Montreal Gazette, he was given the unflattering nickname "Baldy" because he had lost his hair at an early age. Winkler wore a modified baseball cap in goal partly because rival fans often threw objects at his hairless pate.

Winkler recorded 15 shutouts in 44 games for the Bruins in 1927–28. Despite the NHL's regular season almost doubling in length from what it was in 1927–28, Winkler's mark is still tied for second for most shutouts in a single NHL season (tied with 3 others). Winkler recorded two playoff shutouts for Boston during the 1927 Stanley Cup playoffs. Both games were scoreless ties.

During the 1957–58 season the Stanley Cup was redone. Winkler's name was added to the Stanley Cup as a member of the 1929 Bruins. He played the whole season in the minors, as teams carried only one goaltender the backup goaltender would play for the teams minor league affiliate, for Winkler this was the Minneapolis Millers the Boston Bruins minor league team in the AHA.

His death at age 62 (wrongly reported as age 64 in the Montreal Gazette), came after "a lengthy illness." Winkler died at the Winnipeg General Hospital.

== Career statistics ==
=== Regular season and playoffs ===
			Regular season								Playoffs
Season	Team	League	GP	W	L	T	Min	GA	SO	GAA	GP	W	L	T	Min	GA	SO	GAA
1913–14	Winnipeg Winnipegs	MHL	8	2	6	0	480	47	0	5.87	—	—	—	—	—	—	—	—
1914–15	Winnipeg Winnipegs	MHL	6	—	—	—	300	51	0	8.50	—	—	—	—	—	—	—	—
1915–16	Winnipeg 61st Battalion	MHL	1	1	0	0	60	4	0	4.00	—	—	—	—	—	—	—	—
1916–17	Winnipeg Monarchs	MHL	8	3	5	0	480	46	0	5.75	—	—	—	—	—	—	—	—
1917–18	Winnipeg Ypres	MHL	8	6	2	0	480	29	0	3.63	1	1	0	0	60	0	1	0.00
1917–18	Winnipeg Ypres	Al-Cup	—	—	—	—	—	—	—	—	4	3	1	0	240	9	1	2.25
1918–19	Brandon Elks	MHL	9	5	4	0	540	49	0	5.41	—	—	—	—	—	—	—	—
1919–20	Moose Jaw Maple Leafs	SSHL	12	9	3	0	730	40	0	3.29	2	2	0	0	120	4	0	2.00
1920–21	Saskatoon Crescents	SSHL	16	10	6	0	960	49	2	3.06	4	2	2	0	240	14	0	3.50
1921–22	Edmonton Eskimos	WCHL	14	10	4	0	831	33	1	2.38	2	0	1	1	120	3	0	1.50
1922–23	Edmonton Eskimos	WCHL	28	17	10	1	1738	87	1	3.00	—	—	—	—	—	—	—	—
1922–23	Edmonton Eskimos	St-Cup	—	—	—	—	—	—	—	—	2	0	2	0	123	3	0	1.46
1923–24	Edmonton Eskimos	WCHL	26	9	13	4	1655	69	1	2.50	—	—	—	—	—	—	—	—
1924–25	Calgary Tigers	WCHL	28	17	11	0	1680	80	2	2.86	2	0	1	1	120	3	0	1.50
1925–26	Calgary Tigers	WHL	30	10	17	3	1874	80	6	2.56	—	—	—	—	—	—	—	—
1926–27	New York Rangers	NHL	8	3	4	1	473	13	2	1.65	—	—	—	—	—	—	—	—
1926–27	Boston Bruins	NHL	23	12	9	2	1445	40	4	1.66	8	2	2	4	520	13	2	1.50
1927–28	Boston Bruins	NHL	44	20	13	11	2780	70	15	1.51	2	0	1	1	120	5	0	2.50
1928–29	Minneapolis Millers	AHA	34	17	7	10	2144	35	14	0.98	4	1	3	0	240	7	0	1.75
1929–30	Seattle Eskimos	PCHL	36	15	13	8	2160	58	9	1.61	—	—	—	—	—	—	—	—
1930–31	Boston Tigers	Can-Am	10	3	7	0	610	32	0	3.15	—	—	—	—	—	—	—	—
WCHL/WHL totals			126	63	55	8	7778	349	11	2.69	4	0	2	2	240	6	0	1.61
NHL totals			75	35	26	14	4698	123	21	1.57	10	2	3	5	670	18	2	1.61

== Awards and achievements ==
- WCHL All-Star Team (1923)
