= List of Major League Baseball postseason series =

This is a complete listing of Major League Baseball (MLB) postseason series, grouped by franchise. Series featuring relocated teams (Note: Series featuring the Atlanta Braves include series played as the Boston Braves (1912–1935; 1941–1952) and Milwaukee Braves (1953–1965); series featuring the Baltimore Orioles include series played as the St. Louis Browns (1903–1953); series featuring the Los Angeles Dodgers include series played as the Brooklyn Robins/Dodgers (1914–1957); series featuring the Minnesota Twins include series played as the Washington Senators (1903–1960); series featuring the Oakland Athletics include series played as the Philadelphia Athletics (1903–1954); series featuring the San Francisco Giants include series played as the New York Giants (1903–1957); series featuring the Washington Nationals include series played as the Montreal Expos (1969–2004).) are kept with their ultimate relocation franchises. Bolded years indicate wins. Tables are sorted first by the number of series, then the number of wins, and then alphabetically. The list only includes postseason series played since the introduction of the World Series in 1903.

== Arizona Diamondbacks ==
Opponent	S	Occurrences	GP	Rec	%
Colorado Rockies	2	2007, **2017**	5	1–1	.500
St. Louis Cardinals	2	**2001**, 2002	8	1–1	.500
Milwaukee Brewers	2	2011, **2023**	7	1–1	.500
Los Angeles Dodgers	2	2017, **2023**	6	1–1	.500
Atlanta Braves	1	**2001**	5	1–0	1.000
Chicago Cubs	1	**2007**	3	1–0	1.000
New York Yankees	1	**2001**	7	1–0	1.000
Philadelphia Phillies	1	**2023**	7	1–0	1.000
New York Mets	1	1999	4	0–1	.000
Texas Rangers	1	2023	5	0–1	.000
Totals	14		57	8–6	.571

== Athletics ==
Opponent	S	Occurrences	GP	Rec	%
San Francisco Giants	4	1905, **1911**, **1913**, **1989**	20	3–1	.750
Boston Red Sox	4	1975, **1988**, **1990**, 2003	16	2–2	.500
Detroit Tigers	4	**1972**, 2006, 2012, 2013	19	1–3	.250
New York Yankees	4	1981, 2000, 2001, 2018	14	0–4	.000
Baltimore Orioles	3	1971, **1973**, **1974**	12	2–1	.667
Chicago Cubs	2	**1910**, **1929**	10	2–0	1.000
Cincinnati Reds	2	**1972**, 1990	11	1–1	.500
Kansas City Royals	2	**1981**, 2014	4	1–1	.500
Los Angeles Dodgers	2	**1974**, 1988	10	1–1	1.000
Minnesota Twins	2	2002, **2006**	8	1–1	.500
St. Louis Cardinals	2	**1930**, 1931	13	1–1	.500
Toronto Blue Jays	2	**1989**, 1992	11	1–1	.500
Chicago White Sox	1	**2020**	3	1–0	1.000
New York Mets	1	**1973**	7	1–0	1.000
Atlanta Braves	1	1914	4	0–1	.000
Houston Astros	1	2020	4	0–1	.000
Tampa Bay Rays	1	2019	1	0–1	.000
Totals	38		167	18–20	.474

== Atlanta Braves ==
Opponent	S	Occurrences	GP	Rec	%
Houston Astros	6	**1997**, **1999**, **2001**, 2004, 2005, **2021**	25	4–2	.667
Los Angeles Dodgers	6	**1996**, 2013, 2018, 2020, **2021**, 2026	28	2–4	.333
St. Louis Cardinals	5	1982, **1996**, 2000, 2012, 2019	19	1–4	.200
New York Yankees	4	**1957**, 1958, 1996, 1999	24	1–3	.250
Philadelphia Phillies	4	1993, 2022, 2023, **2026**	17	1–3	.250
Cincinnati Reds	2	**1995**, **2020**	6	2–0	1.000
Pittsburgh Pirates	2	**1991**, **1992**	14	2–0	1.000
Chicago Cubs	2	**1998**, 2003	8	1–1	.500
Cleveland Guardians	2	1948, **1995**	12	1–1	.500
Miami Marlins	2	1997, **2020**	9	1–1	.500
New York Mets	2	1969, **1999**	9	1–1	.500
San Francisco Giants	2	2002, 2010	9	0–2	.000
San Diego Padres	2	1998, 2024	8	0–2	.000
Colorado Rockies	1	**1995**	4	1–0	1.000
Milwaukee Brewers	1	**2021**	4	1–0	1.000
Oakland Athletics	1	**1914**	4	1–0	1.000
Arizona Diamondbacks	1	2001	5	0–1	.000
Minnesota Twins	1	1991	7	0–1	.000
Toronto Blue Jays	1	1992	6	0–1	.000
Totals	47		218	20–27	.426

== Baltimore Orioles ==
Opponent	S	Occurrences	GP	Rec	%
Oakland Athletics	3	**1971**, 1973, 1974	12	1–2	.333
Minnesota Twins	2	**1969**, **1970**	6	2–0	1.000
Cleveland Guardians	2	**1996**, 1997	10	1–1	.500
Texas Rangers	2	**2012**, 2023	4	1–1	.500
New York Yankees	2	1996, 2012	10	0–2	.000
Pittsburgh Pirates	2	1971, 1979	14	0–2	.000
Kansas City Royals	2	2014, 2024	6	0–2	.000
Chicago White Sox	1	**1983**	4	1–0	1.000
Cincinnati Reds	1	**1970**	5	1–0	1.000
Detroit Tigers	1	**2014**	3	1–0	1.000
Los Angeles Angels	1	**1979**	4	1–0	1.000
Los Angeles Dodgers	1	**1966**	4	1–0	1.000
Philadelphia Phillies	1	**1983**	5	1–0	1.000
Seattle Mariners	1	**1997**	4	1–0	1.000
New York Mets	1	1969	5	0–1	.000
St. Louis Cardinals	1	1944	6	0–1	.000
Toronto Blue Jays	1	2016	1	0–1	.000
Totals	25		103	12–13	.480

== Boston Red Sox ==
Opponent	S	Occurrences	GP	Rec	%
New York Yankees	7	1999, 2003, **2004**, **2018**, **2021**, 2025, 2026	29	3–4	.429
Los Angeles Angels	5	**1986**, **2004**, **2007**, **2008**, 2009	20	4–1	.800
Cleveland Guardians	5	1995, 1998, **1999**, **2007**, 2016	22	2–3	.400
Oakland Athletics	4	**1975**, 1988, 1990, **2003**	16	2–2	.500
St. Louis Cardinals	4	1946, 1967, **2004**, **2013**	24	2–2	.500
Tampa Bay Rays	3	2008, **2013**, **2021**	15	2–1	.667
Houston Astros	3	2017, **2018**, 2021	15	1–2	.333
Los Angeles Dodgers	2	**1916**, **2018**	10	2–0	1.000
Chicago Cubs	1	**1918**	6	1–0	1.000
Colorado Rockies	1	**2007**	4	1–0	1.000
Detroit Tigers	1	**2013**	6	1–0	1.000
Philadelphia Phillies	1	**1915**	5	1–0	1.000
Pittsburgh Pirates	1	**1903**	8	1–0	1.000
San Francisco Giants	1	**1912**	7	1–0	1.000
Chicago White Sox	1	2005	3	0–1	.000
Cincinnati Reds	1	1975	7	0–1	.000
New York Mets	1	1986	7	0–1	.000
Totals	42		204	24–18	.571

== Chicago Cubs ==
Opponent	S	Occurrences	GP	Rec	%
Detroit Tigers	4	**1907**, **1908**, 1935, 1945	22	2–2	.500
Los Angeles Dodgers	3	2008, **2016**, 2017	14	1–2	.333
San Diego Padres	3	1984, **2025**, 2026	10	1–2	.333
Atlanta Braves	2	1998, **2003**	8	1–1	.500
San Francisco Giants	2	1989, **2016**	9	1–1	.500
Miami Marlins	2	2003, 2020	9	0–2	.000
New York Yankees	2	1932, 1938	8	0–2	.000
Oakland Athletics	2	1910, 1929	10	0–2	.000
Cleveland Guardians	1	**2016**	7	1–0	1.000
Pittsburgh Pirates	1	**2015**	1	1–0	1.000
St. Louis Cardinals	1	**2015**	4	1–0	1.000
Washington Nationals	1	**2017**	5	1–0	1.000
Arizona Diamondbacks	1	2007	3	0–1	.000
Boston Red Sox	1	1918	6	0–1	.000
Chicago White Sox	1	1906	6	0–1	.000
Colorado Rockies	1	2018	1	0–1	.000
Milwaukee Brewers	1	2025	5	0–1	.000
New York Mets	1	2015	4	0–1	.000
Totals	30		132	10–20	.333

== Chicago White Sox ==
Opponent	S	Occurrences	GP	Rec	%
Houston Astros	3	**2005**, 2021, **2026**	10	2–1	.667
Boston Red Sox	1	**2005**	3	1–0	1.000
Chicago Cubs	1	**1906**	6	1–0	1.000
Los Angeles Angels	1	**2005**	5	1–0	1.000
San Francisco Giants	1	**1917**	6	1–0	1.000
Baltimore Orioles	1	1983	4	0–1	.000
Cincinnati Reds	1	1919	8	0–1	.000
Los Angeles Dodgers	1	1959	6	0–1	.000
Seattle Mariners	1	2000	3	0–1	.000
Tampa Bay Rays	1	2008	4	0–1	.000
Toronto Blue Jays	1	1993	6	0–1	.000
Oakland Athletics	1	2020	3	0–1	.000
Cleveland Guardians	1	2026	5	0–1	.000
Totals	15		69	6–9	.400

== Cincinnati Reds ==
Opponent	S	Occurrences	GP	Rec	%
Pittsburgh Pirates	6	**1970**, **1972**, **1975**, 1979, **1990**, 2013	21	4–2	.667
New York Yankees	3	1939, 1961, **1976**	13	1–2	.333
Los Angeles Dodgers	2	**1995**, 2025	5	1–1	.500
Oakland Athletics	2	1972, **1990**	11	1–1	.500
Philadelphia Phillies	2	**1976**, 2010	6	1–1	.500
Atlanta Braves	2	1995, 2020	6	0–2	.000
Boston Red Sox	1	**1975**	7	1–0	1.000
Chicago White Sox	1	**1919**	8	1–0	1.000
Detroit Tigers	1	**1940**	7	1–0	1.000
Baltimore Orioles	1	1970	5	0–1	.000
New York Mets	1	1973	5	0–1	.000
San Francisco Giants	1	2012	5	0–1	.000
Totals	23		99	11–12	.478

== Cleveland Guardians ==
Opponent	S	Occurrences	GP	Rec	%
New York Yankees	7	**1997**, 1998, **2007**, 2017, 2020, 2022, 2024	32	2–5	.286
Boston Red Sox	5	**1995**, **1998**, 1999, 2007, **2016**	22	3–2	.600
Tampa Bay Rays	3	2013, **2022**, 2026	9	1–2	.333
Atlanta Braves	2	**1948**, 1995	12	1–1	.500
Baltimore Orioles	2	1996, **1997**	10	1–1	.500
Detroit Tigers	2	**2024**, 2025	8	1–1	.500
Seattle Mariners	2	**1995**, 2001	11	1–1	.500
Los Angeles Dodgers	1	**1920**	7	1–0	1.000
Toronto Blue Jays	1	**2016**	5	1–0	1.000
Chicago White Sox	1	**2026**	5	1–0	1.000
Chicago Cubs	1	2016	7	0–1	.000
Houston Astros	1	2018	3	0–1	.000
Miami Marlins	1	1997	7	0–1	.000
San Francisco Giants	1	1954	4	0–1	.000
Totals	30		142	13–17	.433

== Colorado Rockies ==
Opponent	S	Occurrences	GP	Rec	%
Arizona Diamondbacks	2	**2007**, 2017	5	1–1	.500
Philadelphia Phillies	2	**2007**, 2009	7	1–1	.500
Chicago Cubs	1	**2018**	1	1–0	1.000
Atlanta Braves	1	1995	4	0–1	.000
Boston Red Sox	1	2007	4	0–1	.000
Milwaukee Brewers	1	2018	3	0–1	.000
Totals	8		24	3–5	.375

== Detroit Tigers ==
Opponent	S	Occurrences	GP	Rec	%
Oakland Athletics	4	1972, **2006**, **2012**, **2013**	19	3–1	.750
Chicago Cubs	4	1907, 1908, **1935**, **1945**	22	2–2	.500
New York Yankees	3	**2006**, **2011**, **2012**	13	3–0	1.000
St. Louis Cardinals	3	1934, **1968**, 2006	19	1–2	.333
Cleveland Guardians	2	2024, **2025**	8	1–1	.500
Houston Astros	1	**2024**	2	1–0	1.000
Kansas City Royals	1	**1984**	3	1–0	1.000
San Diego Padres	1	**1984**	5	1–0	1.000
Baltimore Orioles	1	2014	3	0–1	.000
Boston Red Sox	1	2013	6	0–1	.000
Cincinnati Reds	1	1940	7	0–1	.000
Minnesota Twins	1	1987	5	0–1	.000
Pittsburgh Pirates	1	1909	7	0–1	.000
San Francisco Giants	1	2012	4	0–1	.000
Seattle Mariners	1	2025	5	0–1	.000
Texas Rangers	1	2011	6	0–1	.000
Totals	27		134	13–14	.481

== Houston Astros ==
Opponent	S	Occurrences	GP	Rec	%
Atlanta Braves	6	1997, 1999, 2001, **2004**, **2005**, 2021	25	2–4	.333
New York Yankees	4	**2015**, **2017**, **2019**, **2022**	18	4–0	1.000
Boston Red Sox	3	**2017**, 2018, **2021**	15	2–1	.667
Chicago White Sox	3	2005, **2021**, 2026	10	1–2	.333
Minnesota Twins	2	**2020**, **2023**	6	2–0	1.000
Los Angeles Dodgers	2	1981, **2017**	12	1–1	.500
Philadelphia Phillies	2	1980, **2022**	11	1–1	.500
St. Louis Cardinals	2	2004, **2005**	13	1–1	.500
Tampa Bay Rays	2	**2019**, 2020	12	1–1	.500
Cleveland Guardians	1	**2018**	3	1–0	1.000
Oakland Athletics	1	**2020**	4	1–0	1.000
Seattle Mariners	1	**2022**	3	1–0	1.000
Detroit Tigers	1	2024	2	0–1	.000
Kansas City Royals	1	2015	5	0–1	.000
New York Mets	1	1986	6	0–1	.000
San Diego Padres	1	1998	4	0–1	.000
Texas Rangers	1	2023	7	0–1	.000
Washington Nationals	1	2019	7	0–1	.000
Totals	35		163	18–17	.514

== Kansas City Royals ==
Opponent	S	Occurrences	GP	Rec	%
New York Yankees	5	1976, 1977, 1978, **1980**, 2024	21	1–4	.200
Toronto Blue Jays	2	**1985**, **2015**	13	2–0	1.000
Baltimore Orioles	2	**2014**, **2024**	6	2–0	1.000
Oakland Athletics	2	1981, **2014**	4	1–1	.500
Houston Astros	1	**2015**	5	1–0	1.000
Los Angeles Angels	1	**2014**	3	1–0	1.000
New York Mets	1	**2015**	5	1–0	1.000
St. Louis Cardinals	1	**1985**	7	1–0	1.000
Detroit Tigers	1	1984	3	0–1	.000
Philadelphia Phillies	1	1980	6	0–1	.000
San Francisco Giants	1	2014	7	0–1	.000
Totals	18		80	10–8	.556

== Los Angeles Angels ==
Opponent	S	Occurrences	GP	Rec	%
Boston Red Sox	5	1986, 2004, 2007, 2008, **2009**	20	1–4	.200
New York Yankees	3	**2002**, **2005**, 2009	15	2–1	.667
Minnesota Twins	1	**2002**	5	1–0	1.000
San Francisco Giants	1	**2002**	7	1–0	1.000
Baltimore Orioles	1	1979	4	0–1	.000
Chicago White Sox	1	2005	5	0–1	.000
Kansas City Royals	1	2014	3	0–1	.000
Milwaukee Brewers	1	1982	5	0–1	.000
Totals	14		64	5–9	.357

== Los Angeles Dodgers ==
Opponent	S	Occurrences	GP	Rec	%
New York Yankees	12	1941, 1947, 1949, 1952, 1953, **1955**, 1956, **1963**, 1977, 1978, **1981**, **2024**	71	4–8	.333
Atlanta Braves	6	1996, **2013**, **2018**, **2020**, 2021, **2026**	28	4–2	.667
Philadelphia Phillies	6	**1977**, **1978**, 1983, 2008, 2009, **2025**	26	3–3	.500
St. Louis Cardinals	6	1985, 2004, **2009**, 2013, 2014, **2021**	24	2–4	.333
Milwaukee Brewers	4	**2018**, **2020**, **2025**, 2026	17	3–1	.750
New York Mets	4	**1988**, 2006, 2015, **2024**	21	2–2	.500
Chicago Cubs	3	**2008**, 2016, **2017**	14	2–1	.667
Washington Nationals	3	**1981**, **2016**, 2019	15	2–1	.667
San Diego Padres	3	**2020**, 2022, **2024**	12	2–1	.667
Arizona Diamondbacks	2	**2017**, 2023	6	1–1	.500
Cincinnati Reds	2	1995, **2025**	5	1–1	.500
Houston Astros	2	**1981**, 2017	12	1–1	.500
Oakland Athletics	2	1974, **1988**	10	1–1	.500
Boston Red Sox	2	1916, 2018	10	0–2	.000
Chicago White Sox	1	**1959**	6	1–0	1.000
Minnesota Twins	1	**1965**	7	1–0	1.000
Pittsburgh Pirates	1	**1974**	4	1–0	1.000
San Francisco Giants	1	**2021**	5	1–0	1.000
Tampa Bay Rays	1	**2020**	6	1–0	1.000
Toronto Blue Jays	1	**2025**	7	1–0	1.000
Baltimore Orioles	1	1966	4	0–1	.000
Cleveland Guardians	1	1920	7	0–1	.000
Totals	65		315	34–31	.523

== Miami Marlins ==
Opponent	S	Occurrences	GP	Rec	%
Chicago Cubs	2	**2003**, **2020**	9	2–0	1.000
San Francisco Giants	2	**1997**, **2003**	7	2–0	1.000
Atlanta Braves	2	**1997**, 2020	9	1–1	.500
Cleveland Guardians	1	**1997**	7	1–0	1.000
New York Yankees	1	**2003**	6	1–0	1.000
Philadelphia Phillies	1	2023	2	0–1	.000
Totals	9		40	7–2	.778

== Milwaukee Brewers ==
Opponent	S	Occurrences	GP	Rec	%
Los Angeles Dodgers	4	2018, 2020, 2025, **2026**	17	1–3	.250
Arizona Diamondbacks	2	**2011**, 2023	7	1–1	.500
St. Louis Cardinals	2	1982, 2011	13	0–2	.000
Chicago Cubs	1	**2025**	5	1–0	1.000
Colorado Rockies	1	**2018**	3	1–0	1.000
Los Angeles Angels	1	**1982**	5	1–0	1.000
San Diego Padres	1	**2026**	4	1–0	1.000
Tampa Bay Rays	1	**2026**	5	1–0	1.000
Atlanta Braves	1	2021	4	0–1	.000
New York Mets	1	2024	3	0–1	.000
New York Yankees	1	1981	5	0–1	.000
Philadelphia Phillies	1	2008	4	0–1	.000
Washington Nationals	1	2019	1	0–1	.000
Totals	18		76	7–11	.389

== Minnesota Twins ==
Opponent	S	Occurrences	GP	Rec	%
New York Yankees	6	2003, 2004, 2009, 2010, 2017, 2019	18	0–6	.000
Toronto Blue Jays	2	**1991**, **2023**	7	2–0	.000
Oakland Athletics	2	**2002**, 2006	8	1–1	.500
San Francisco Giants	2	**1924**, 1933	12	1–1	.500
Baltimore Orioles	2	1969, 1970	6	0–2	.000
Houston Astros	2	2020, 2023	6	0–2	.000
Atlanta Braves	1	**1991**	7	1–0	1.000
Detroit Tigers	1	**1987**	5	1–0	.000
St. Louis Cardinals	1	**1987**	7	1–0	1.000
Los Angeles Angels	1	2002	5	0–1	.000
Los Angeles Dodgers	1	1965	7	0–1	.000
Pittsburgh Pirates	1	1925	7	0–1	.000
Totals	22		95	7–15	.318

== New York Mets ==
Opponent	S	Occurrences	GP	Rec	%
Los Angeles Dodgers	4	1988, **2006**, **2015**, 2024	21	2–2	.500
Atlanta Braves	2	**1969**, 1999	9	1–1	.500
St. Louis Cardinals	2	**2000**, 2006	12	1–1	.500
San Francisco Giants	2	**2000**, 2016	5	1–1	.500
Arizona Diamondbacks	1	**1999**	4	1–0	1.000
Baltimore Orioles	1	**1969**	5	1–0	1.000
Boston Red Sox	1	**1986**	7	1–0	1.000
Chicago Cubs	1	**2015**	4	1–0	1.000
Cincinnati Reds	1	**1973**	5	1–0	1.000
Houston Astros	1	**1986**	6	1–0	1.000
Milwaukee Brewers	1	**2024**	3	1–0	1.000
Philadelphia Phillies	1	**2024**	4	1–0	1.000
Kansas City Royals	1	2015	5	0–1	.000
New York Yankees	1	2000	5	0–1	.000
Oakland Athletics	1	1973	7	0–1	.000
San Diego Padres	1	2022	3	0–1	.000
Totals	22		105	13–9	.591

== New York Yankees ==
Opponent	S	Occurrences	GP	Rec	%
Los Angeles Dodgers	12	**1941**, **1947**, **1949**, **1952**, **1953**, 1955, **1956**, 1963, **1977**, **1978**, 1981, 2024	71	8–4	.667
San Francisco Giants	7	1921, 1922, **1923**, **1936**, **1937**, **1951**, **1962**	43	5–2	.714
Cleveland Guardians	7	1997, **1998**, 2007, **2017**, **2020**, **2022**, **2024**	32	5–2	.714
Boston Red Sox	7	**1999**, **2003**, 2004, 2018, 2021, **2025**, **2026**	29	4–3	.571
Minnesota Twins	6	**2003**, **2004**, **2009**, **2010**, **2017**, **2019**	18	6–0	1.000
Kansas City Royals	5	**1976**, **1977**, **1978**, 1980, **2024**	21	4–1	.800
St. Louis Cardinals	5	1926, **1928**, 1942, **1943**, 1964	28	2–3	.400
Oakland Athletics	4	**1981**, **2000**, **2001**, **2018**	14	4–0	1.000
Atlanta Braves	4	1957, **1958**, **1996**, **1999**	24	3–1	.750
Texas Rangers	4	**1996**, **1998**, **1999**, 2010	16	3–1	.750
Houston Astros	4	2015, 2017, 2019, 2022	18	0–4	.000
Cincinnati Reds	3	**1939**, **1961**, 1976	13	2–1	.667
Seattle Mariners	3	1995, **2000**, **2001**	16	2–1	.667
Los Angeles Angels	3	2002, 2005, **2009**	15	1–2	.333
Detroit Tigers	3	2006, 2011, 2012	13	0–3	.000
Baltimore Orioles	2	**1996**, **2012**	10	2–0	1.000
Chicago Cubs	2	**1932**, **1938**	8	2–0	1.000
Philadelphia Phillies	2	**1950**, **2009**	10	2–0	1.000
Pittsburgh Pirates	2	**1927**, 1960	11	1–1	.500
Tampa Bay Rays	2	2020, 2026	8	0–2	.000
Milwaukee Brewers	1	**1981**	5	1–0	1.000
New York Mets	1	**2000**	5	1–0	1.000
San Diego Padres	1	**1998**	4	1–0	1.000
Arizona Diamondbacks	1	2001	7	0–1	.000
Miami Marlins	1	2003	6	0–1	.000
Toronto Blue Jays	1	2025	4	0–1	.000
Totals	93		449	59–34	.634

== Philadelphia Phillies ==
Opponent	S	Occurrences	GP	Rec	%
Los Angeles Dodgers	6	1977, 1978, **1983**, **2008**, **2009**, 2025	26	3–3	.500
Atlanta Braves	4	**1993**, **2022**, **2023**, 2026	17	3–1	.750
Cincinnati Reds	2	1976, **2010**	6	1–1	.500
Colorado Rockies	2	2007, **2009**	7	1–1	.500
Houston Astros	2	**1980**, 2022	11	1–1	.500
St. Louis Cardinals	2	2011, **2022**	7	1–1	.500
New York Yankees	2	1950, 2009	10	0–2	.000
Kansas City Royals	1	**1980**	6	1–0	1.000
Miami Marlins	1	**2023**	2	1–0	1.000
Milwaukee Brewers	1	**2008**	4	1–0	1.000
San Diego Padres	1	**2022**	5	1–0	1.000
Tampa Bay Rays	1	**2008**	5	1–0	1.000
Arizona Diamondbacks	1	2023	7	0–1	.000
Baltimore Orioles	1	1983	5	0–1	.000
Boston Red Sox	1	1915	5	0–1	.000
New York Mets	1	2024	4	0–1	.000
San Francisco Giants	1	2010	6	0–1	.000
Toronto Blue Jays	1	1993	6	0–1	.000
Washington Nationals	1	1981	5	0–1	.000
Totals	32		144	15–17	.469

== Pittsburgh Pirates ==
Opponent	S	Occurrences	GP	Rec	%
Cincinnati Reds	6	1970, 1972, 1975, **1979**, 1990, **2013**	21	2–4	.333
Baltimore Orioles	2	**1971**, **1979**	14	2–0	1.000
New York Yankees	2	1927, **1960**	11	1–1	.500
San Francisco Giants	2	**1971**, 2014	5	1–1	.500
Atlanta Braves	2	1991, 1992	14	0–2	.000
Detroit Tigers	1	**1909**	7	1–0	1.000
Minnesota Twins	1	**1925**	7	1–0	1.000
Boston Red Sox	1	1903	8	0–1	.000
Chicago Cubs	1	2015	1	0–1	.000
Los Angeles Dodgers	1	1974	4	0–1	.000
St. Louis Cardinals	1	2013	5	0–1	.000
Totals	20		97	8–12	.400

== St. Louis Cardinals ==
Opponent	S	Occurrences	GP	Rec	%
Los Angeles Dodgers	6	**1985**, **2004**, 2009, **2013**, **2014**, 2021	24	4–2	.667
Atlanta Braves	5	**1982**, 1996, **2000**, **2012**, **2019**	19	4–1	.800
New York Yankees	5	**1926**, 1928, **1942**, 1943, **1964**	28	3–2	.600
San Diego Padres	4	**1996**, **2005**, **2006**, 2020	13	3–1	.750
Boston Red Sox	4	**1946**, **1967**, 2004, 2013	24	2–2	.500
San Francisco Giants	4	**1987**, 2002, 2012, 2014	24	1–3	.250
Detroit Tigers	3	**1934**, 1968, **2006**	19	2–1	.667
Milwaukee Brewers	2	**1982**, **2011**	13	2–0	1.000
Arizona Diamondbacks	2	2001, **2002**	8	1–1	.500
Houston Astros	2	**2004**, 2005	13	1–1	.500
New York Mets	2	2000, **2006**	12	1–1	.500
Oakland Athletics	2	1930, **1931**	13	1–1	.500
Philadelphia Phillies	2	**2011**, 2022	7	1–1	.500
Washington Nationals	2	**2012**, 2019	9	1–1	.500
Baltimore Orioles	1	**1944**	6	1–0	1.000
Pittsburgh Pirates	1	**2013**	5	1–0	1.000
Texas Rangers	1	**2011**	7	1–0	1.000
Chicago Cubs	1	2015	4	0–1	.000
Kansas City Royals	1	1985	7	0–1	.000
Minnesota Twins	1	1987	7	0–1	.000
Totals	51		262	30–21	.588

== San Diego Padres ==
Opponent	S	Occurrences	GP	Rec	%
St. Louis Cardinals	4	1996, 2005, 2006, **2020**	13	1–3	.250
Los Angeles Dodgers	3	2020, **2022**, 2024	12	1–2	.333
Chicago Cubs	3	**1984**, 2025, **2026**	10	2–1	.667
Atlanta Braves	2	**1998**, **2024**	8	2–0	1.000
Houston Astros	1	**1998**	4	1–0	1.000
New York Mets	1	**2022**	3	1–0	1.000
Detroit Tigers	1	1984	5	0–1	.000
New York Yankees	1	1998	4	0–1	.000
Philadelphia Phillies	1	2022	5	0–1	.000
Milwaukee Brewers	1	2026	4	0–1	.000
Totals	18		68	8–10	.444

== San Francisco Giants ==
Opponent	S	Occurrences	GP	Rec	%
New York Yankees	7	**1921**, **1922**, 1923, 1936, 1937, 1951, 1962	43	2–5	.286
St. Louis Cardinals	4	1987, **2002**, **2012**, **2014**	24	3–1	.750
Oakland Athletics	4	**1905**, 1911, 1913, 1989	20	1–3	.250
Atlanta Braves	2	**2002**, **2010**	9	2–0	1.000
Chicago Cubs	2	**1989**, 2016	9	1–1	.500
Minnesota Twins	2	1924, **1933**	12	1–1	.500
New York Mets	2	2000, **2016**	5	1–1	.500
Pittsburgh Pirates	2	1971, **2014**	5	1–1	.500
Miami Marlins	2	1997, 2003	7	0–2	.000
Cincinnati Reds	1	**2012**	5	1–0	1.000
Cleveland Guardians	1	**1954**	4	1–0	1.000
Detroit Tigers	1	**2012**	4	1–0	1.000
Kansas City Royals	1	**2014**	7	1–0	1.000
Philadelphia Phillies	1	**2010**	6	1–0	1.000
Texas Rangers	1	**2010**	5	1–0	1.000
Washington Nationals	1	**2014**	4	1–0	1.000
Boston Red Sox	1	1912	7	0–1	.000
Chicago White Sox	1	1917	6	0–1	.000
Los Angeles Angels	1	2002	7	0–1	.000
Los Angeles Dodgers	1	2021	5	0–1	.000
Totals	38		194	19–19	.500

== Seattle Mariners ==
Opponent	S	Occurrences	GP	Rec	%
New York Yankees	3	**1995**, 2000, 2001	16	1–2	.333
Cleveland Guardians	2	1995, **2001**	11	1–1	.500
Toronto Blue Jays	2	**2022**, 2025	9	1–1	.500
Chicago White Sox	1	**2000**	3	1–0	1.000
Detroit Tigers	1	**2025**	5	1–0	1.000
Baltimore Orioles	1	1997	4	0–1	.000
Houston Astros	1	2022	3	0–1	.000
Totals	11		51	5–6	.455

== Tampa Bay Rays ==
Opponent	S	Occurrences	GP	Rec	%
Cleveland Guardians	3	**2013**, 2022, **2026**	9	2–1	.667
Boston Red Sox	3	**2008**, 2013, 2021	15	1–2	.333
Texas Rangers	3	2010, 2011, 2023	11	0–3	.000
New York Yankees	2	**2020**, **2026**	8	2–0	1.000
Houston Astros	2	2019, **2020**	12	1–1	.500
Chicago White Sox	1	**2008**	4	1–0	1.000
Oakland Athletics	1	**2019**	1	1–0	1.000
Toronto Blue Jays	1	**2020**	2	1–0	1.000
Los Angeles Dodgers	1	2020	6	0–1	.000
Milwaukee Brewers	1	2026	5	0–1	.000
Philadelphia Phillies	1	2008	5	0–1	.000
Totals	19		78	9–10	.474

== Texas Rangers ==
Opponent	S	Occurrences	GP	Rec	%
New York Yankees	4	1996, 1998, 1999, **2010**	16	1–3	.250
Tampa Bay Rays	3	**2010**, **2011**, **2023**	11	3–0	1.000
Baltimore Orioles	2	2012, **2023**	4	1–1	.500
Toronto Blue Jays	2	2015, 2016	8	0–2	.000
Arizona Diamondbacks	1	**2023**	5	1–0	1.000
Detroit Tigers	1	**2011**	6	1–0	1.000
Houston Astros	1	**2023**	7	1–0	1.000
St. Louis Cardinals	1	2011	7	0–1	.000
San Francisco Giants	1	2010	5	0–1	.000
Totals	16		69	8–8	.500

== Toronto Blue Jays ==
Opponent	S	Occurrences	GP	Rec	%
Texas Rangers	2	**2015**, **2016**	8	2–0	1.000
Oakland Athletics	2	1989, **1992**	11	1–1	.500
Seattle Mariners	2	2022, **2025**	9	1–1	.500
Kansas City Royals	2	1985, 2015	13	0–2	.000
Minnesota Twins	2	1991, 2023	7	0–2	.000
Atlanta Braves	1	**1992**	6	1–0	1.000
Baltimore Orioles	1	**2016**	1	1–0	1.000
Chicago White Sox	1	**1993**	6	1–0	1.000
New York Yankees	1	**2025**	4	1–0	1.000
Philadelphia Phillies	1	**1993**	6	1–0	1.000
Cleveland Guardians	1	2016	5	0–1	.000
Los Angeles Dodgers	1	2025	7	0–1	.000
Tampa Bay Rays	1	2020	2	0–1	.000
Totals	18		85	9–9	.500

== Washington Nationals ==
Opponent	S	Occurrences	GP	Rec	%
Los Angeles Dodgers	3	1981, 2016, **2019**	15	1–2	.333
St. Louis Cardinals	2	2012, **2019**	9	1–1	.500
Houston Astros	1	**2019**	7	1–0	1.000
Milwaukee Brewers	1	**2019**	1	1–0	1.000
Philadelphia Phillies	1	**1981**	5	1–0	1.000
Chicago Cubs	1	2017	5	0–1	.000
San Francisco Giants	1	2014	4	0–1	.000
Totals	10		46	5–5	.500

== Most frequent matchups ==
Rank	Total	Team	Record	Team	Last occurrence
1	12	New York Yankees	8–4	Los Angeles Dodgers	2024
2	7	New York Yankees	5–2	Cleveland Guardians	2024
2	7	New York Yankees	5–2	San Francisco Giants	1962
2	7	New York Yankees	4–3	Boston Red Sox	2026
4	6	New York Yankees	6–0	Minnesota Twins	2019
4	6	Los Angeles Dodgers	4–2	Atlanta Braves	2026
4	6	Atlanta Braves	4–2	Houston Astros	2021
4	6	St. Louis Cardinals	4–2	Los Angeles Dodgers	2021
4	6	Cincinnati Reds	4–2	Pittsburgh Pirates	2013
4	6	Los Angeles Dodgers	3–3	Philadelphia Phillies	2025
10	5	New York Yankees	4–1	Kansas City Royals	2024
10	5	St. Louis Cardinals	4–1	Atlanta Braves	2019
10	5	Boston Red Sox	4–1	Los Angeles Angels	2009
10	5	Cleveland Guardians	3–2	Boston Red Sox	2016
10	5	St. Louis Cardinals	3–2	New York Yankees	1964

== See also ==
- List of NBA playoff series
- List of NFL playoff games
- List of NHL playoff series
