= 1919 Stanley Cup playoffs =

Ice hockey tournament

Tournament details
- Dates: February 22–March 29, 1919
- Teams: 4

Final positions
- Champions: None
- Runners-up: Montreal Canadiens; Seattle Metropolitans
- Semifinalists: Ottawa Senators; Vancouver Millionaires

Tournament statistics
- Scoring leader(s): Newsy Lalonde (Montreal)

The 1919 Stanley Cup playoffs was an ice hockey tournament held at the conclusion of the 1918–19 season. It was played from February 22 to March 29 for the Stanley Cup. The Cup Final, between the National Hockey League (NHL) champion Montreal Canadiens and the Pacific Coast Hockey Association (PCHA) champion Seattle Metropolitans, ended after five games due to the Spanish flu outbreak, with the teams tied at two wins each with one tie. After the series, the Canadiens' manager attempted to award the Cup to Seattle, but the Seattle team refused it; both teams' names are engraved on the Cup as co-champions. It was the only time in the history of the Stanley Cup that it was not awarded due to a no-decision after playoffs were held.

== NHL Championship ==
The 1918–19 NHL season began with three teams, but the season ended early with the Toronto Arenas suspending operations. This left the Montreal Canadiens and Ottawa Senators – coincidentally the two teams leading each half of the season – to play off for the championship. Montreal won the best-of-seven series, four games to one.

February 22	Ottawa Senators	4–8	Montreal Canadiens	Jubilee Arena	Recap
Cy Denneny (1) – 04:45; Harry Cameron (1) – 06:15		First period	02:25 – Didier Pitre (1)
Jack Darragh (1) – 19:55		Second period	05:05 – Odie Cleghorn (1); 07:30 – Odie Cleghorn (2); 19:25 – Newsy Lalonde (1)
Jack Darragh (2) – 12:00		Third period	01:55 – Newsy Lalonde (2); 14:45 – Joe Malone (1); 15:30 – Joe Malone (2); 18:15 – Joe Malone (3)
Clint Benedict		Goalie stats	Georges Vezina

February 27	Montreal Canadiens	5–3	Ottawa Senators	The Arena	Recap
No scoring		First period	No scoring
Joe Malone (4) – 05:00; Joe Malone (5) – 10:00		Second period	04:00 – Harry Cameron (2); 19:00 – Buck Boucher (1)
Odie Cleghorn (3) – 01:00; Odie Cleghorn (4) – 06:00; Odie Cleghorn (5) – 10:00		Third period	18:00 – Cy Denneny (2)
Georges Vezina		Goalie stats	Clint Benedict

March 1	Ottawa Senators	3–6	Montreal Canadiens	Jubilee Arena	Recap
No scoring		First period	11:35 – Newsy Lalonde (3); 15:25 – Newsy Lalonde (4)
Punch Broadbent (1) – 15:05; Eddie Gerard (1) – 19:35		Second period	02:15 – Newsy Lalonde (4); 10:20 – Didier Pitre (2); 19:55 – Newsy Lalonde (5)
Punch Broadbent (2) – 08:35		Third period	17:45 – Newsy Lalonde (6)
Clint Benedict		Goalie stats	Georges Vezina

March 3	Montreal Canadiens	3–6	Ottawa Senators	The Arena	Recap
Newsy Lalonde (7) – 11:00; Odie Cleghorn (6) – 19:00		First period	09:00 – Eddie Gerard (2)
Newsy Lalonde (8) – 13:00		Second period	02:00 – Cy Denneny (3); 06:00 – Harry Cameron (3); 10:00 – Sprague Cleghorn (1)
No scoring		Third period	08:00 – Eddie Gerard (3); 12:00 – Buck Boucher (2)
Georges Vezina		Goalie stats	Clint Benedict

March 6	Ottawa Senators	2–4	Montreal Canadiens	Jubilee Arena	Recap
No scoring		First period	10:00 – Newsy Lalonde (9)
Harry Cameron (4) – 03:00		Second period	13:00 – Newsy Lalonde (10)
Sprague Cleghorn (1) – 05:10		Third period	01:40 – Bert Corbeau (1); 10:00 – Odie Cleghorn (7)
Clint Benedict		Goalie stats	Georges Vezina

Montreal won series 4–1

== PCHA Championship ==
The Vancouver Millionaires finished the 1919 PCHA regular season in first place, but lost the league's championship to the second place Seattle Metropolitans in a two-game total-goals series.

Seattle Metropolitans vs. Vancouver Millionaires

Date	Away	Score	Home	Score	Notes
March 12	Vancouver Millionaires	1	Seattle Metropolitans	6	
March 14	Seattle Metropolitans	1	Vancouver Millionaires	4	

Seattle wins two-game total-goals series 7 to 5

== Finals ==
The 1919 Stanley Cup Final was cancelled after five games had been played due to an outbreak of Spanish flu. With the teams tied at two wins each with one tie, no champion was declared.

March 19	Montreal Canadiens	0-7	Seattle Metropolitans	Seattle Ice Arena	Recap
No scoring		First period	4:51 - Muzz Murray (1); 8:34 - Frank Foyston (1)
No scoring		Second period	5:58 - Muzz Murray (2); 9:55 - Frank Foyston (2); 16:38 - Jack Walker (1)
No scoring		Third period	5:43 - Frank Foyston (3); 14:44 - Ran McDonald (1)
Georges Vezina		Goalie stats	Hap Holmes

March 22	Montreal Canadiens	4-2	Seattle Metropolitans	Seattle Ice Arena	Recap
Newsy Lalonde (1) - 8:44		First period	No scoring
Newsy Lalonde (2) - 8:18; Newsy Lalonde (3) - 16:35		Second period	No scoring
Newsy Lalonde (4) - 9:49		Third period	11:03 - Bobby Rowe (1); 11:11 - Frank Foyston (4)
Georges Vezina		Goalie stats	Hap Holmes

March 24	Montreal Canadiens	2-7	Seattle Metropolitans	Seattle Ice Arena	Recap
No scoring		First period	1:03 - Frank Foyston (5); 7:41 - Frank Foyston (6); 15:54 - Cully Wilson (1); 18:36 - Frank Foyston (7)
No scoring		Second period	No scoring
Odie Cleghorn (1) - 3:21; Louis Berlinguette (1) - 12:34		Third period	12:39 - Frank Foyston (8); 12:51 - Muzz Murray (3); 14:57 - Roy Rickey (1)
Georges Vezina		Goalie stats	Hap Holmes

March 26	Montreal Canadiens	0-0	2OT	Seattle Metropolitans	Seattle Ice Arena	Recap
No scoring		First period		No scoring
No scoring		Second period		No scoring
No scoring		Third period		No scoring
No scoring		Second overtime period		No scoring
Georges Vezina		Goalie stats		Hap Holmes

March 29	Montreal Canadiens	4-3	OT	Seattle Metropolitans	Seattle Ice Arena	Recap
No scoring		First period		5:40 - Frank Foyston (9); 12:52 - Jack Walker (2)
No scoring		Second period		1:18 - Jack Walker (3)
Odie Cleghorn (2) - 4:00; Newsy Lalonde (5) - 5:01; Newsy Lalonde (6) - 17:05		Third period		No scoring
Georges Vezina		Goalie stats		Hap Holmes

Series stopped at 2-2-1
