= 1918 Stanley Cup playoffs =

Ice hockey tournament

The 1918 Stanley Cup playoffs was an ice hockey tournament held at the conclusion of the 1917–18 season. It was the first season that the Stanley Cup was contested by the National Hockey League (NHL), the successor to the National Hockey Association (NHA). The tournament was played from March 11 until March 30, when the NHL champion Toronto Hockey Club defeated the Pacific Coast Hockey Association (PCHA) champion Vancouver Millionaires in the final series.

== Bracket ==
League championships two-game total goals series
NHL Final (O'Brien Cup)
1H Montreal Canadiens	7
2H Toronto Hockey Club	10
PCHA Final
1 Seattle Metropolitans	2
2 Vancouver Millionaires	3

Stanley Cup Final best-of-five series
Stanley Cup Final
Toronto Hockey Club	3
Vancouver Millionaires	2

== NHL Championship ==
The NHL adopted the split regular season format used by its predecessor, the NHA. Montreal won the first half of the NHL split season and Toronto won the second half. The two teams then played a two-game total-goals series for the NHL championship and the O'Brien Cup. Toronto won the series and advanced to the Stanley Cup Final.

March 11	Montreal Canadiens	3–7	Toronto Hockey Club	Mutual Street Arena	Recap
No scoring		First period	Harry Meeking (1) - 5:00; Ken Randall (1) - 17:00
4:00 - Newsy Lalonde (1)		Second period	Harry Meeking (2) - 5:00
7:00 - Bert Corbeau (1); 13:00 - Newsy Lalonde (2)		Third period	Harry Meeking (3) - 5:00; Jack Adams (1) - 11:00; Harry Cameron (1) - 12:00; Harry Mummery (1) - 14:00
Georges Vezina		Goalie stats	Hap Holmes

March 13	Toronto Hockey Club	3–4	Montreal Canadiens	Montreal Arena	Recap
12:00 - Reg Noble (1)		First period	No scoring
16:51 - Rusty Crawford (1)		Second period	Joe Malone (1) - 4:25; Jack McDonald (1) - 5:30
8:00 - Rusty Crawford (2)		Third period	Newsy Lalonde (3) - 1:40; Newsy Lalonde (4) - 10:30
Georges Vezina		Goalie stats	Hap Holmes

Toronto won series on total goals 10–7

== PCHA championship ==
The Vancouver Millionaires finished the PCHA regular season in second place, then defeated the first place and defending Stanley Cup Seattle Metropolitans, taking a two-game total-goals series 3–2 on a 1–0 win over Seattle in the second game. Barney Stanley scored the decisive goal, the only goal of the second game.

Seattle Metropolitans vs. Vancouver Millionaires

Date	Away	Score	Home	Score	Notes
March 11	Seattle	2	Vancouver	2	
March 14	Vancouver	1	Seattle	0	

Vancouver Millionaires win two-games total-goals series 3–2.

== Stanley Cup Final ==
March 20	Vancouver Millionaires	3–5	Toronto Hockey Club	Mutual Street Arena	Recap
16:00 – Cyclone Taylor (1); 17:00 – Cyclone Taylor (2)		First period	Reg Noble (2) – 08:00; Harry Meeking (4) – 10:00; Reg Noble (3) – 11:00; Alf Skinner (1) – 19:50
10:00 – Mickey MacKay (1)		Second period	Alf Skinner (2) – 13:00
No scoring		Third period	No scoring
Hugh Lehman		Goalie stats	Hap Holmes

March 23	Toronto Hockey Club	4–6	Vancouver Millionaires	Mutual Street Arena	Recap
Alf Skinner (3) – 17:00		First period	18:00 – Cyclone Taylor (3)
Harry Cameron (2) 16:00		Second period	02:00 – Cyclone Taylor (4); 06:00 – Mickey MacKay (2); 14:00 – Mickey MacKay (3)
Alf Skinner (4) – 08:00; Alf Skinner (5) – 16:00		Third period	06:00 – Si Griffis (1); 10:00 – Mickey MacKay (3)
Hap Holmes		Goalie stats	Hugh Lehman

March 26	Vancouver Millionaires	3–6	Toronto Hockey Club	Mutual Street Arena	Recap
No scoring		First period	05:00 – Harry Cameron (3); 08:00 – Alf Skinner (6); 13:00 – Corb Denneny (1)
Ran McDonald (1) – pp – 06:00; Cyclone Taylor (5) – 16:00		Second period	11:00 – Harry Cameron (4); 14:00 – Corb Denneny (2)
Cyclone Taylor (6) – 03:00		Third period	13:00 – Alf Skinner (7)
Hugh Lehman		Goalie stats	Hap Holmes

March 28	Toronto Hockey Club	1–8	Vancouver Millionaires	Mutual Street Arena	Recap
No scoring		First period	05:00 – Cyclone Taylor (7)
Ken Randall (1) – 04:26		Second period	04:00 – Barney Stanley (1); 11:06 – Mickey MacKay (5); 13:06 – Barney Stanley (2)
No scoring		Third period	06:00 – Cyclone Taylor (8); 13:00 – pp – Lloyd Cook (1); 13:45 – pp – Ran MacDonald (2); 15:00 – pp – Lloyd Cook (2)
Hap Holmes		Goalie stats	Hugh Lehman

March 30	Vancouver Millionaires	1–2	Toronto Hockey Club	Mutual Street Arena	Recap
No scoring		First period	No scoring
No scoring		Second period	No scoring
Cyclone Taylor (9) – 09:30		Third period	00:30 – Alf Skinner (8); 10:30 – Corb Denneny (3)
Hugh Lehman		Goalie stats	Hap Holmes

Toronto won series 3–2

== Statistics ==
=== NHL playoff scoring leaders ===
GP = Games Played, G = Goals, A = Assists, Pts = Points

Player	Team	GP	G	A	Pts
Alf Skinner	Toronto	7	8	3	11
Newsy Lalonde	Canadiens	2	4		4
Harry Cameron	Toronto	7	4		4
Harry Meeking	Toronto	7	4		4
Reg Noble	Toronto	7	3		3
