= 1927 Stanley Cup playoffs =

NHL postseason tournament

Tournament details
- Dates: March 29 – April 13, 1927
- Teams: 6
- Defending champions: Montreal Maroons

Final positions
- Champions: Ottawa Senators
- Runner-up: Boston Bruins

The 1927 Stanley Cup playoffs was the playoff tournament of the National Hockey League (NHL) for the 1926–27 season. With the collapse of the Western Hockey League prior to the season, the Stanley Cup became the championship trophy of the NHL, and the Stanley Cup playoffs became synonymous with the NHL's postseason. The Ottawa Senators defeated the Boston Bruins, 2–0–2 in a best-of-three series with ties allowed, to win the Cup.

== Playoff seeds ==
The NHL adopted a new league alignment for the 1926–27 season, dividing into two divisions. The top three teams in each division qualified for the playoffs.

Canadian Division

1. Ottawa Senators – 64 points
2. Montreal Canadiens – 58 points
3. Montreal Maroons – 44 points

American Division

1. New York Rangers – 56 points
2. Boston Bruins – 48 points
3. Chicago Black Hawks – 41 points

== Playoff bracket ==
In the first round, the second-place team in each division played against the third-place team from their division. Each division winner received a first round bye, then met the first round winner from their division in the second round. The two divisional playoff winners then advanced to the Stanley Cup Finals. In the first two rounds, teams competed in a two-game total-goals series. The Stanley Cup Finals was instead competed in a best-of-three format, with ties allowed for a maximum of five games.

First round
Canadian Division
C2	Mtl Canadiens	2G
C3	Mtl Maroons	1G
American Division
A2	Boston	10G
A3	Chicago	5G

Semifinals
C1	Ottawa	5G
C2	Mtl Canadiens	1G
A1	NY Rangers	1G
A2	Boston	3G

Final
C1	Ottawa	2
A2	Boston	0

== Quarterfinals ==
=== (C2) Montreal Canadiens vs. (C3) Montreal Maroons ===
March 29	Montreal Canadiens	1–1	Montreal Maroons	Montreal Forum	Recap
Aurele Joliat (1) – 19:57		First period	No scoring
No scoring		Second period	12:15 – Babe Siebert (1)
No scoring		Third period	No scoring
George Hainsworth		Goalie stats	Clint Benedict

March 31	Montreal Maroons	0–1	OT	Montreal Canadiens	Montreal Forum	Recap
No scoring		First period		No scoring
No scoring		Second period		No scoring
No scoring		Third period		No scoring
No scoring		First overtime period		12:05 – Howie Morenz (1)
Clint Benedict		Goalie stats		George Hainsworth

Montreal Canadiens won series on total goals 2–1

=== (A2) Boston Bruins vs. (A3) Chicago Black Hawks ===
Game one of this series was played in New York.

March 29	Boston Bruins	6–1	Chicago Black Hawks	Madison Square Garden III	Recap
Frank Fredrickson (1) – 03:24; Sprague Cleghorn (1) – 14:36; Jimmy Herberts (1) – 16:57		First period	No scoring
No scoring		Second period	09:43 – Gord Fraser (1)
Frank Fredrickson (2) – 08:26; Harry Oliver (1) – 14:55; Eddie Shore (1) – 16:55		Third period	No scoring
Hal Winkler		Goalie stats	Hugh Lehman

March 31	Chicago Black Hawks	4–4	Boston Bruins	Boston Arena	Recap
No scoring		First period	No scoring
George Hay (1) – 16:00; Dick Irvin (1) – 18:00		Second period	05:00 – Percy Galbraith (1); 10:00 – Billy Coutu (1); 15:00 – Percy Galbraith (2)
Cully Wilson (1) – 07:00; Dick Irvin (2) – 10:00		Third period	04:00 – Percy Galbraith (3)
Hugh Lehman		Goalie stats	Hal Winkler

Boston won series on total goals 10–5

== Semifinals ==
=== (C1) Ottawa Senators vs. (C2) Montreal Canadiens ===
April 2	Ottawa Senators	4–0	Montreal Canadiens	Montreal Forum	Recap
Cy Denneny (1) – 09:45; Hec Kilrea (1) – 10:10; Hooley Smith (1) – 17:40		First period	No scoring
Frank Nighbor (1) – 11:40		Second period	No scoring
No scoring		Third period	No scoring
Alec Connell		Goalie stats	George Hainsworth

April 4	Montreal Canadiens	1–1	Ottawa Senators	Ottawa Auditorium	Recap
Sylvio Mantha (1) – 11:40		First period	No scoring
No scoring		Second period	12:58 – Frank Finnigan (1)
No scoring		Third period	No scoring
George Hainsworth		Goalie stats	Alec Connell

Ottawa won series on total goals 5–1

=== (A1) New York Rangers vs. (A2) Boston Bruins ===
April 2	New York Rangers	0–0	Boston Bruins	Boston Arena	Recap
No scoring		First period	No scoring
No scoring		Second period	No scoring
No scoring		Third period	No scoring
Lorne Chabot		Goalie stats	Hal Winkler

April 4	Boston Bruins	3–1	New York Rangers	Madison Square Garden III	Recap
No scoring		First period	04:51 – Bill Cook (1)
Jimmy Herberts (2) – 07:42; Lionel Hitchman (1) – 17:33; Harry Oliver (2) – 18:37		Second period	No scoring
No scoring		Third period	No scoring
Hal Winkler		Goalie stats	Lorne Chabot

Boston won series on total goals 3–1

== Stanley Cup Finals ==
The Stanley Cup Finals was originally intended to be a best-of-three series, but a game could end as a tie after one overtime period. After the first game was declared a tie, NHL president Frank Calder ruled that the series would go no more than five games. If the teams were still tied after five games, the teams would share the championship.

April 7	Ottawa Senators	0–0	OT	Boston Bruins	Boston Arena	Recap
No scoring		First period		No scoring
No scoring		Second period		No scoring
No scoring		Third period		No scoring
No scoring		First overtime period		No scoring
Alec Connell		Goalie stats		Hal Winkler

April 9	Ottawa Senators	3–1	Boston Bruins	Boston Arena	Recap
King Clancy (1) – 06:37; Frank Finnigan (2) – 11:23		First period	No scoring
No scoring		Second period	No scoring
Cy Denneny (2) – 19:55		Third period	16:45 – Harry Oliver (3)
Alec Connell		Goalie stats	Hal Winkler

April 11	Boston Bruins	1–1	OT	Ottawa Senators	Ottawa Auditorium	Recap
Jimmy Herberts (3) – 07:00		First period		No scoring
No scoring		Second period		15:00 – Cy Denneny (3)
No scoring		Third period		No scoring
No scoring		First overtime period		No scoring
Hal Winkler		Goalie stats		Alec Connell

April 13	Boston Bruins	1–3	Ottawa Senators	Ottawa Auditorium	Recap
No scoring		First period	No scoring
No scoring		Second period	05:00 – Frank Finnigan (3); 07:30 – Cy Denneny (4)
Harry Oliver (4) – 17:50		Third period	11:00 – Cy Denneny (5)
Hal Winkler		Goalie stats	Alec Connell

Ottawa won series 2–0–2

== Scoring leaders ==
Note: GP = Games played; G = Goals; A = Assists; Pts = Points

Player	Team	GP	G	A	Pts
Harry Oliver	Boston Bruins	8	4	2	6
Percy Galbraith	Boston Bruins	8	3	3	6

== See also ==
- 1926–27 NHL season
