= List of NFL playoff games =

This is a complete listing of National Football League (NFL) playoff games, grouped by franchise. Games featuring relocated teams (Note: Games featuring the Arizona Cardinals include games played as the Chicago Cardinals (1920–1943; 1945–1959) and St. Louis Cardinals (1960–1987); games featuring the Indianapolis Colts include games played as the Baltimore Colts (1953–1983); games featuring the Kansas City Chiefs include games played as the Dallas Texans (1960–1962); games featuring the Las Vegas Raiders include games played as the Oakland Raiders (1960–1981; 1995–2019) and Los Angeles Raiders (1982–1994); games featuring the Los Angeles Chargers include games played as the San Diego Chargers (1961–2016); games featuring the Los Angeles Rams include games played as the Cleveland Rams (1936–1942; 1944–1945) and St. Louis Rams (1995–2015); games featuring the Tennessee Titans include games played as the Houston Oilers (1960–1996); games featuring the Washington Commanders include games played as the Boston Redskins (1933–1936), the Washington Redskins (1937–2019) and the Washington Football Team (2020–2021).) are kept with their ultimate relocation franchises. Bolded years indicate wins. "(Years in italics)" indicate a pending playoff game. Tables are sorted first by the number of games, then the number of wins, and then by season. Updated through 2025 Wild Card Weekend..

== Arizona Cardinals ==
Opponent	G	Occurrences	W	L	%
Philadelphia Eagles	3	**1947**, 1948, **2008**	2	1	.667
Green Bay Packers	3	1982, **2009**, **2015**	2	1	.667
Carolina Panthers	3	**2008**, 2014, 2015	1	2	.333
Minnesota Vikings	2	1974, 1998	0	2	.000
Los Angeles Rams	2	1975, 2021	0	2	.000
Dallas Cowboys	1	**1998**	1	0	1.000
Atlanta Falcons	1	**2008**	1	0	1.000
Pittsburgh Steelers	1	2008	0	1	.000
New Orleans Saints	1	2009	0	1	.000
Totals	17		7	10	.412

== Atlanta Falcons ==
Opponent	G	Occurrences	W	L	%
Green Bay Packers	4	1995, **2002**, 2010, **2016**	2	2	.500
Philadelphia Eagles	4	**1978**, 2002, 2004, 2017	1	3	.250
Los Angeles Rams	2	**2004**, **2017**	2	0	1.000
Seattle Seahawks	2	**2012**, **2016**	2	0	1.000
Minnesota Vikings	2	1982, **1998**	1	1	.500
San Francisco 49ers	2	**1998**, 2012	1	1	.500
Dallas Cowboys	2	1978, 1980	0	2	.000
New Orleans Saints	1	**1991**	1	0	1.000
Washington Commanders	1	1991	0	1	.000
Denver Broncos	1	1998	0	1	.000
Arizona Cardinals	1	2008	0	1	.000
New York Giants	1	2011	0	1	.000
New England Patriots	1	2016	0	1	.000
Totals	24		10	14	.417

== Baltimore Ravens ==
Opponent	G	Occurrences	W	L	%
Tennessee Titans	5	**2000**, 2003, **2008**, 2019, **2020**	3	2	.600
Pittsburgh Steelers	5	2001, 2008, 2010, **2014**, **2024**	2	3	.400
New England Patriots	4	**2009**, 2011, **2012**, 2014	2	2	.500
Indianapolis Colts	3	2006, 2009, **2012**	1	2	.333
Denver Broncos	2	**2000**, **2012**	2	0	1.000
Miami Dolphins	2	**2001**, **2008**	2	0	1.000
Houston Texans	2	**2011**, **2023**	2	0	1.000
Kansas City Chiefs	2	**2010**, 2023	1	1	.500
Buffalo Bills	2	2020, 2024	0	2	.000
New York Giants	1	**2000**	1	0	1.000
Las Vegas Raiders	1	**2000**	1	0	1.000
San Francisco 49ers	1	**2012**	1	0	1.000
Los Angeles Chargers	1	2018	0	1	.000
Cincinnati Bengals	1	2022	0	1	.000
Totals	32		18	14	.563

== Buffalo Bills ==
Opponent	G	Occurrences	W	L	%
Kansas City Chiefs	7	1966, **1991**, **1993**, 2020, 2021, 2023, 2024	2	5	.286
Miami Dolphins	5	**1990**, **1992**, **1995**, 1998, **2022**	4	1	.800
Pittsburgh Steelers	4	1974, **1992**, 1995, **2023**	2	2	.500
Los Angeles Chargers	3	**1964**, **1965**, 1980	2	1	.667
Tennessee Titans	3	**1988**, **1992**, 1999	2	1	.667
Denver Broncos	3	**1991**, **2024**, 2025	2	1	0.667
Jacksonville Jaguars	3	1996, 2017, **2025**	1	2	.333
Cincinnati Bengals	3	1981, 1988, 2022	0	3	.000
Las Vegas Raiders	2	**1990**, **1993**	2	0	1.000
Baltimore Ravens	2	**2020**, **2024**	2	0	1.000
New England Patriots	2	1963, **2021**	1	1	.500
Dallas Cowboys	2	1992, 1993	0	2	.000
New York Jets	1	**1981**	1	0	1.000
Indianapolis Colts	1	**2020**	1	0	1.000
Cleveland Browns	1	1989	0	1	.000
New York Giants	1	1990	0	1	.000
Washington Commanders	1	1991	0	1	.000
Houston Texans	1	2019	0	1	.000
Totals	45		22	23	.489

== Carolina Panthers ==
Opponent	G	Occurrences	W	L	%
Arizona Cardinals	3	2008, **2014**, **2015**	2	1	.667
Seattle Seahawks	3	2005, 2014, **2015**	1	2	.333
Dallas Cowboys	2	**1996**, **2003**	2	0	1.000
Los Angeles Rams	2	**2003**, 2025	1	1	.500
Philadelphia Eagles	1	**2003**	1	0	1.000
Chicago Bears	1	**2005**	1	0	1.000
New York Giants	1	**2005**	1	0	1.000
Green Bay Packers	1	1996	0	1	.000
New England Patriots	1	2003	0	1	.000
San Francisco 49ers	1	2013	0	1	.000
Denver Broncos	1	2015	0	1	.000
New Orleans Saints	1	2017	0	1	.000
Totals	18		9	9	.500

== Chicago Bears ==
Opponent	G	Occurrences	W	L	%
New York Giants	8	**1933**, 1934, **1941**, **1946**, 1956, **1963**, **1985**, 1990	5	3	.625
Washington Commanders	7	1937, **1940**, 1942, **1943**, **1984**, 1986, 1987	3	4	.429
Philadelphia Eagles	4	1979, **1988**, 2001, 2018	1	3	.250
Green Bay Packers	3	**1941**, 2010, **2025**	2	1	.667
New Orleans Saints	3	**1990**, **2006**, 2020	2	1	.667
Los Angeles Rams	3	1950, **1985**, 2025	1	2	.333
San Francisco 49ers	3	1984, 1988, 1994	0	3	.000
Seattle Seahawks	2	**2006**, **2010**	2	0	1.000
Dallas Cowboys	2	1977, 1991	0	2	.000
New England Patriots	1	**1985**	1	0	1.000
Minnesota Vikings	1	**1994**	1	0	1.000
Carolina Panthers	1	2005	0	1	000
Indianapolis Colts	1	2006	0	1	.000
Totals	39		18	21	.462

== Cincinnati Bengals ==
Opponent	G	Occurrences	W	L	%
Buffalo Bills	3	**1981**, **1988**, **2022**	3	0	1.000
Las Vegas Raiders	3	1975, 1990, **2021**	1	2	.333
Tennessee Titans	2	**1990**, **2021**	2	0	1.000
Los Angeles Chargers	2	**1981**, 2013	1	1	.500
Kansas City Chiefs	2	**2021,** 2022	1	1	.500
Indianapolis Colts	2	1970, 2014	0	2	.000
San Francisco 49ers	2	1981, 1988	0	2	.000
New York Jets	2	1982, 2009	0	2	.000
Pittsburgh Steelers	2	2005, 2015	0	2	.000
Houston Texans	2	2011, 2012	0	2	.000
Seattle Seahawks	1	**1988**	1	0	1.000
Baltimore Ravens	1	**2022**	1	0	1.000
Miami Dolphins	1	1973	0	1	.000
Los Angeles Rams	1	2021	0	1	.000
Totals	26		10	16	.385

== Cleveland Browns ==
Opponent	G	Occurrences	W	L	%
Indianapolis Colts	4	**1964**, 1968, 1971, **1987**	2	2	.500
Detroit Lions	4	1952, 1953, **1954**, 1957	1	3	.250
Los Angeles Rams	3	**1950**, 1951, **1955**	2	1	.667
Dallas Cowboys	3	1967, **1968**, **1969**	2	1	.667
Pittsburgh Steelers	3	1994, 2002, **2020**	1	2	.333
Denver Broncos	3	1986, 1987, 1989	0	3	.000
New York Yankees	2	**1946**, **1947**	2	0	1.000
Buffalo Bills (AAFC)	2	**1948**, **1949**	2	0	1.000
New York Giants	2	**1950**, 1958	1	1	.500
Miami Dolphins	2	1972, 1985	0	2	.000
Las Vegas Raiders	2	1980, 1982	0	2	.000
San Francisco 49ers	1	**1949**	1	0	1.000
New York Jets	1	**1986**	1	0	1.000
Buffalo Bills	1	**1989**	1	0	1.000
New England Patriots	1	**1994**	1	0	1.000
Green Bay Packers	1	1965	0	1	.000
Minnesota Vikings	1	1969	0	1	.000
Tennessee Titans	1	1988	0	1	.000
Kansas City Chiefs	1	2020	0	1	.000
Houston Texans	1	2023	0	1	.000
Totals	39		17	22	.436

== Dallas Cowboys ==
Opponent	G	Occurrences	W	L	%
San Francisco 49ers	9	**1970**, **1971**, **1972**, 1981, **1992**, **1993**, 1994, 2021, 2022	5	4	.556
Los Angeles Rams	9	**1973**, **1975**, 1976, **1978**, 1979, **1980**, 1983, 1985, 2018	4	5	.444
Green Bay Packers	9	1966, 1967, **1982**, **1993**, **1994**, **1995**, 2014, 2016, 2023	4	5	.444
Minnesota Vikings	7	**1971**, 1973, **1975**, **1977**, **1996**, 1999, 2009	4	3	.571
Philadelphia Eagles	4	1980, **1992**, **1995**, **2009**	3	1	.750
Tampa Bay Buccaneers	3	**1981**, **1982**, **2022**	3	0	1.000
Detroit Lions	3	**1970**, 1991, **2014**	2	1	.667
Cleveland Browns	3	**1967**, 1968, 1969	1	2	.333
Pittsburgh Steelers	3	1975, 1978, **1995**	1	2	.333
Chicago Bears	2	**1977**, **1991**	2	0	1.000
Atlanta Falcons	2	**1978**, **1980**	2	0	1.000
Buffalo Bills	2	**1992**, **1993**	2	0	1.000
Seattle Seahawks	2	2006, **2018**	1	1	.500
Washington Commanders	2	1972, 1982	0	2	.000
Carolina Panthers	2	1996, 2003	0	2	.000
Miami Dolphins	1	**1971**	1	0	1.000
Denver Broncos	1	**1977**	1	0	1.000
Indianapolis Colts	1	1970	0	1	.000
Arizona Cardinals	1	1998	0	1	.000
New York Giants	1	2007	0	1	.000
Totals	67		36	31	.537

== Denver Broncos ==
Opponent	G	Occurrences	W	L	%
Pittsburgh Steelers	8	**1977**, 1978, 1984, **1989**, **1997**, 2005, **2011**, **2015**	5	3	.625
New England Patriots	6	**1986**, **2005**, 2011, **2013**, **2015**, 2025	4	2	.667
Cleveland Browns	3	**1986**, **1987**, **1989**	3	0	1.000
Tennessee Titans	3	1979, **1987**, **1991**	2	1	.667
Buffalo Bills	3	1991, 2024, **2025**	1	2	.333
Indianapolis Colts	3	2003, 2004, 2014	0	3	.000
Las Vegas Raiders	2	**1977**, 1993	1	1	.500
Jacksonville Jaguars	2	1996, **1997**	1	1	.500
Seattle Seahawks	2	1983, 2013	0	2	.000
Baltimore Ravens	2	2000, 2012	0	2	.000
Green Bay Packers	1	**1997**	1	0	1.000
Kansas City Chiefs	1	**1997**	1	0	1.000
Atlanta Falcons	1	**1998**	1	0	1.000
Miami Dolphins	1	**1998**	1	0	1.000
New York Jets	1	**1998**	1	0	1.000
Los Angeles Chargers	1	**2013**	1	0	1.000
Carolina Panthers	1	**2015**	1	0	1.000
Dallas Cowboys	1	1977	0	1	.000
New York Giants	1	1986	0	1	.000
Washington Commanders	1	1987	0	1	.000
San Francisco 49ers	1	1989	0	1	.000
Totals	45		24	21	.533

== Detroit Lions ==
Opponent	G	Occurrences	W	L	%
Cleveland Browns	4	**1952**, **1953**, 1954, **1957**	3	1	.800
Washington Commanders	4	1982, 1991, 1999, 2024	0	4	.000
San Francisco 49ers	3	**1957**, 1983, 2023	1	2	.333
Dallas Cowboys	3	1970, **1991**, 2014	1	2	.333
Los Angeles Rams	2	**1952**, **2023**	2	0	1.000
Tampa Bay Buccaneers	2	1997, **2023**	1	1	.500
Green Bay Packers	2	1993, 1994	0	2	.000
New York Giants	1	**1935**	1	0	1.000
Philadelphia Eagles	1	1995	0	1	.000
New Orleans Saints	1	2011	0	1	.000
Seattle Seahawks	1	2016	0	1	.000
Totals	24		9	15	.375

== Green Bay Packers ==
Opponent	G	Occurrences	W	L	%
San Francisco 49ers	10	**1995**, **1996**, **1997**, 1998, **2001**, 2012, 2013, 2019, 2021, 2023	4	6	.400
Dallas Cowboys	9	**1966**, **1967**, 1982, 1993, 1994, 1995, **2014**, **2016**, **2023**	5	4	.556
New York Giants	8	1938, **1939**, **1944**, **1961**, **1962**, 2007, 2011, **2016**	5	3	.625
Seattle Seahawks	4	**2003**, **2007**, 2014, **2019**	3	1	.750
Atlanta Falcons	4	**1995**, 2002, **2010**, 2016	2	2	.500
Philadelphia Eagles	4	1960, 2003, **2010**, 2024	1	3	.250
Washington Commanders	3	**1936**, 1972, **2015**	2	1	.667
Los Angeles Rams	3	**1967**, 2001, **2020**	2	1	.667
Chicago Bears	3	1941, **2010**, 2025	1	2	.333
Arizona Cardinals	3	**1982**, 2009, 2015	1	2	.333
Detroit Lions	2	**1993**, **1994**	2	0	1.000
Tampa Bay Buccaneers	2	**1997**, 2020	1	1	.500
Minnesota Vikings	2	2004, **2012**	1	1	.500
Cleveland Browns	1	**1965**	1	0	1.000
Indianapolis Colts	1	**1965**	1	0	1.000
Kansas City Chiefs	1	**1966**	1	0	1.000
Las Vegas Raiders	1	**1967**	1	0	1.000
Carolina Panthers	1	**1996**	1	0	1.000
New England Patriots	1	**1996**	1	0	1.000
Pittsburgh Steelers	1	**2010**	1	0	1.000
Denver Broncos	1	1997	0	1	.000
Totals	65		37	28	.569

== Houston Texans ==
Opponent	G	Occurrences	W	L	%
New England Patriots	3	2012, 2016, 2025	0	3	.000
Kansas City Chiefs	3	2015, 2019, 2024	0	3	.000
Cincinnati Bengals	2	**2011**, **2012**	2	0	1.000
Baltimore Ravens	2	2011, 2023	0	2	.000
Las Vegas Raiders	1	**2016**	1	0	1.000
Buffalo Bills	1	**2019**	1	0	1.000
Cleveland Browns	1	**2023**	1	0	1.000
Los Angeles Chargers	1	**2024**	1	0	1.000
Pittsburgh Steelers	1	**2025**	1	0	1.000
Indianapolis Colts	1	2018	0	1	.000
Totals	16		7	9	.438

== Indianapolis Colts ==
Opponent	G	Occurrences	W	L	%
Kansas City Chiefs	5	**1995**, **2003**, **2006**, **2013**, 2018	4	1	.800
New England Patriots	5	2003, 2004, **2006**, 2013, 2014	1	4	.200
Pittsburgh Steelers	5	1975, 1976, 1995, 1996, 2005	0	5	.000
Cleveland Browns	4	1964, **1968**, **1971**, 1987	2	2	.500
New York Jets	4	1968, 2002, **2009**, 2010	1	3	.250
Denver Broncos	3	**2003**, **2004**, **2014**	3	0	1.000
Baltimore Ravens	3	**2006**, **2009**, 2012	2	1	.667
Los Angeles Chargers	3	**1995**, 2007, 2008	1	2	.333
New York Giants	2	**1958**, **1959**	2	0	1.000
Cincinnati Bengals	2	**1970**, **2014**	2	0	1.000
Las Vegas Raiders	2	**1970**, 1977	1	1	.500
Miami Dolphins	2	1971, 2000	0	2	.000
Minnesota Vikings	1	**1968**	1	0	1.000
Dallas Cowboys	1	**1970**	1	0	1.000
Chicago Bears	1	**2006**	1	0	1.000
Houston Texans	1	**2018**	1	0	1.000
Green Bay Packers	1	1965	0	1	.000
Tennessee Titans	1	1999	0	1	.000
New Orleans Saints	1	2009	0	1	.000
Buffalo Bills	1	2020	0	1	.000
Totals	48		23	25	.479

== Jacksonville Jaguars ==
Opponent	G	Occurrences	W	L	%
New England Patriots	5	1996, **1998**, 2005, 2007, 2017	1	4	.200
Buffalo Bills	3	**1996**, **2017**, 2025	2	1	.667
Pittsburgh Steelers	2	**2007**, **2017**	2	0	1.000
Denver Broncos	2	**1996**, 1997	1	1	.500
Miami Dolphins	1	**1999**	1	0	1.000
Los Angeles Chargers	1	**2022**	1	0	1.000
New York Jets	1	1998	0	1	.000
Tennessee Titans	1	1999	0	1	.000
Kansas City Chiefs	1	2022	0	1	.000
Totals	17		8	9	.471

== Kansas City Chiefs ==
Opponent	G	Occurrences	W	L	%
Buffalo Bills	7	**1966**, 1991, 1993, **2020**, **2021**, **2023**, **2024**	5	2	.714
Indianapolis Colts	5	1995, 2003, 2006, 2013, **2018**	1	4	.200
Tennessee Titans	4	**1962**, **1993**, 2017, **2019**	3	1	.750
Miami Dolphins	4	1971, 1990, 1994, **2023**	1	3	.250
Houston Texans	3	**2015**, **2019**, **2024**	3	0	1.000
Las Vegas Raiders	3	1968, **1969**, **1991**	2	1	.667
Pittsburgh Steelers	3	**1993**, 2016, **2021**	2	1	.667
San Francisco 49ers	2	**2019,** **2023**	2	0	1.000
New York Jets	2	**1969**, 1986	1	1	.500
Baltimore Ravens	2	2010, **2023**	1	1	.500
Cincinnati Bengals	2	2021, **2022**	1	1	.500
Philadelphia Eagles	2	**2022**, 2024	1	1	.500
New England Patriots	2	2015, 2018	0	2	.000
Minnesota Vikings	1	**1969**	1	0	1.000
Cleveland Browns	1	**2020**	1	0	1.000
Jacksonville Jaguars	1	**2022**	1	0	1.000
Green Bay Packers	1	1966	0	1	.000
Los Angeles Chargers	1	1992	0	1	.000
Denver Broncos	1	1997	0	1	.000
Tampa Bay Buccaneers	1	2020	0	1	.000
Totals	48		26	22	.542

== Las Vegas Raiders ==
Opponent	G	Occurrences	W	L	%
Pittsburgh Steelers	6	1972, **1973**, 1974, 1975, **1976**, **1983**	3	3	.500
Tennessee Titans	4	**1967**, **1969**, **1980**, **2002**	4	0	1.000
Miami Dolphins	4	**1970**, 1973, **1974**, **2000**	3	1	.750
New York Jets	4	1968, 1982, **2001**, **2002**	2	2	.500
Cincinnati Bengals	3	**1975**, **1990**, 2021	2	1	.667
Kansas City Chiefs	3	**1968**, 1969, 1991	1	2	.333
New England Patriots	3	**1976**, 1985, 2001	1	2	.333
Cleveland Browns	2	**1980**, **1982**	2	0	1.000
Indianapolis Colts	2	1970, **1977**	1	1	.500
Denver Broncos	2	1977, **1993**	1	1	.500
Seattle Seahawks	2	**1983**, 1984	1	1	.500
Buffalo Bills	2	1990, 1993	0	2	.000
Minnesota Vikings	1	**1976**	1	0	1.000
Los Angeles Chargers	1	**1980**	1	0	1.000
Philadelphia Eagles	1	**1980**	1	0	1.000
Washington Commanders	1	**1983**	1	0	1.000
Green Bay Packers	1	1967	0	1	.000
Baltimore Ravens	1	2000	0	1	.000
Tampa Bay Buccaneers	1	2002	0	1	.000
Houston Texans	1	2016	0	1	.000
Totals	45		25	20	.556

== Los Angeles Chargers ==
Opponent	G	Occurrences	W	L	%
New England Patriots	5	**1963**, 2006, 2007, 2018, 2025	1	4	.200
Miami Dolphins	4	**1981**, 1982, 1992, **1994**	2	2	.500
Tennessee Titans	4	1960, 1961, 1979, **2007**	1	3	.250
Pittsburgh Steelers	3	**1982**, **1994**, 2008	2	1	.667
Indianapolis Colts	3	1995, **2007**, **2008**	2	1	.667
Buffalo Bills	3	1964, 1965, **1980**	1	2	.333
Cincinnati Bengals	2	1981, **2013**	1	1	.500
New York Jets	2	2004, 2009	0	2	.000
Kansas City Chiefs	1	**1992**	1	0	1.000
Baltimore Ravens	1	**2018**	1	0	1.000
Las Vegas Raiders	1	1980	0	1	.000
San Francisco 49ers	1	1994	0	1	.000
Denver Broncos	1	2013	0	1	.000
Jacksonville Jaguars	1	2022	0	1	.000
Houston Texans	1	2024	0	1	.000
Totals	33		12	21	.364

== Los Angeles Rams ==
Opponent	G	Occurrences	W	L	%
Dallas Cowboys	9	1973, 1975, **1976**, 1978, **1979**, 1980, **1983**, **1985**, **2018**	5	4	.556
Minnesota Vikings	8	1969, 1974, 1976, 1977, **1978**, 1988, **1999**, **2024**	3	5	.375
Washington Commanders	4	**1945**, **1974**, 1983, 1986	2	2	.500
Philadelphia Eagles	4	1949, **1989**, **2001**, 2024	2	2	.500
Tampa Bay Buccaneers	3	**1979**, **1999**, **2021**	3	0	1.000
Chicago Bears	3	**1950**, 1985, **2025**	2	1	.667
Seattle Seahawks	3	**2004**, **2020**, 2025	2	1	.667
Cleveland Browns	3	1950, **1951**, 1955	1	2	.333
Green Bay Packers	3	1967, **2001**, 2020	1	2	.333
Arizona Cardinals	2	**1975**, **2021**	2	0	1.000
New York Giants	2	1984, **1989**	1	1	.500
San Francisco 49ers	2	1989, **2021**	1	1	.500
New Orleans Saints	2	2000, **2018**	1	1	.500
Carolina Panthers	2	2003, **2025**	1	1	.500
Detroit Lions	2	1952, 2023	0	2	.000
New England Patriots	2	2001, 2018	0	2	.000
Atlanta Falcons	2	2004, 2017	0	2	.000
Tennessee Titans	1	**1999**	1	0	1.000
Cincinnati Bengals	1	**2021**	1	0	1.00
Pittsburgh Steelers	1	1979	0	1	.000
Totals	59		29	30	.492

== Miami Dolphins ==
Opponent	G	Occurrences	W	L	%
Buffalo Bills	5	1990, 1992, 1995, **1998**, 2022	1	4	.200
Kansas City Chiefs	4	**1971**, **1990**, **1994**, 2023	3	1	.750
Pittsburgh Steelers	4	**1972**, 1979, **1984**, 2016	2	2	.500
Los Angeles Chargers	4	1981, **1982**, **1992**, 1994	2	2	.500
Las Vegas Raiders	4	1970, **1973**, 1974, 2000	1	3	.250
Seattle Seahawks	3	1983, **1984**, **1999**	2	1	.667
New England Patriots	3	**1982**, 1985, 1997	1	2	.333
Indianapolis Colts	2	**1971**, **2000**	2	0	1.000
Cleveland Browns	2	**1972**, **1985**	2	0	1.000
Washington Commanders	2	**1972**, 1982	1	1	.500
Baltimore Ravens	2	2001, 2008	0	2	.000
Cincinnati Bengals	1	**1973**	1	0	1.000
Minnesota Vikings	1	**1973**	1	0	1.000
New York Jets	1	**1982**	1	0	1.000
Dallas Cowboys	1	1971	0	1	.000
Tennessee Titans	1	1978	0	1	.000
San Francisco 49ers	1	1984	0	1	.000
Denver Broncos	1	1998	0	1	.000
Jacksonville Jaguars	1	1999	0	1	.000
Totals	43		20	23	.465

== Minnesota Vikings ==
Opponent	G	Occurrences	W	L	%
Los Angeles Rams	8	**1969**, **1974**, **1976**, **1977**, 1978, **1988**, 1999, 2024	5	3	.625
Dallas Cowboys	7	1971, **1973**, 1975, 1977, 1996, **1999**, **2009**	3	4	.429
San Francisco 49ers	6	1970, **1987**, 1988, 1989, 1997, 2019	1	5	.167
New Orleans Saints	5	**1987**, **2000**, 2009, **2017**, **2019**	4	1	.800
Washington Commanders	5	**1973**, **1976**, 1982, 1987, 1992	2	3	.400
New York Giants	4	1993, **1997**, 2000, 2022	1	3	.250
Philadelphia Eagles	4	1980, 2004, 2008, 2017	0	4	.000
Arizona Cardinals	2	**1974**, **1998**	2	0	1.000
Atlanta Falcons	2	**1982**, 1998	1	1	.500
Green Bay Packers	2	**2004**, 2012	1	1	.500
Cleveland Browns	1	**1969**	1	0	1.000
Indianapolis Colts	1	1968	0	1	.000
Kansas City Chiefs	1	1969	0	1	.000
Miami Dolphins	1	1973	0	1	.000
Pittsburgh Steelers	1	1974	0	1	.000
Las Vegas Raiders	1	1976	0	1	.000
Chicago Bears	1	1994	0	1	.000
Seattle Seahawks	1	2015	0	1	.000
Totals	53		21	32	.396

== New England Patriots ==
Opponent	G	Occurrences	W	L	%
Denver Broncos	6	1986, 2005, **2011**, 2013, 2015, **2025**	2	4	.333
Pittsburgh Steelers	5	**1996**, 1997, **2001**, **2004**, **2016**	4	1	.800
Jacksonville Jaguars	5	**1996**, 1998, **2005**, **2007**, **2017**	4	1	.800
Indianapolis Colts	5	**2003**, **2004**, 2006, **2013**, **2014**	4	1	.800
Los Angeles Chargers	5	1963, **2006**, **2007**, **2018**, **2025**	4	1	.800
Tennessee Titans	4	1978, **2003**, **2017**, 2019	2	2	.500
Baltimore Ravens	4	2009, **2011**, 2012, **2014**	2	2	.500
Houston Texans	3	**2012**, **2016**, **2025**	3	0	1.000
Las Vegas Raiders	3	1976, **1985**, **2001**	2	1	.667
Miami Dolphins	3	1982, **1985**, **1997**	2	1	.667
New York Jets	3	**1985**, **2006**, 2010	2	1	.667
Los Angeles Rams	2	**2001**, **2018**	2	0	1.000
Kansas City Chiefs	2	**2015**, **2018**	2	0	1.000
Buffalo Bills	2	**1963**, 2021	1	1	.500
Philadelphia Eagles	2	**2004**, 2017	1	1	.500
Seattle Seahawks	2	**2014**, 2025	1	1	.500
New York Giants	2	2007, 2011	0	2	.000
Carolina Panthers	1	**2003**	1	0	1.000
Atlanta Falcons	1	**2016**	1	0	1.000
Chicago Bears	1	1985	0	1	.000
Cleveland Browns	1	1994	0	1	.000
Green Bay Packers	1	1996	0	1	.000
Totals	63		40	23	.635

== New Orleans Saints ==
Opponent	G	Occurrences	W	L	%
Minnesota Vikings	5	1987, 2000, **2009**, 2017, 2019	1	4	.200
Philadelphia Eagles	4	1992, **2006**, **2013**, **2018**	3	1	.750
Chicago Bears	3	1990, 2006, **2020**	1	2	.333
Los Angeles Rams	2	**2000**, 2018	1	1	.500
Seattle Seahawks	2	2010, 2013	0	2	.000
Indianapolis Colts	1	**2009**	1	0	1.000
Arizona Cardinals	1	**2009**	1	0	1.000
Detroit Lions	1	**2011**	1	0	1.000
Carolina Panthers	1	**2017**	1	0	1.000
Atlanta Falcons	1	1991	0	1	.000
San Francisco 49ers	1	2011	0	1	.000
Tampa Bay Buccaneers	1	2020	0	1	.000
Totals	23		10	13	.435

== New York Giants ==
Opponent	G	Occurrences	W	L	%
San Francisco 49ers	8	1981, 1984, **1985**, **1986**, **1990**, 1993, 2002, **2011**	4	4	.500
Chicago Bears	8	1933, **1934**, 1941, 1946, **1956**, 1963, 1985, **1990**	3	5	.375
Green Bay Packers	8	**1938**, 1939, 1944, 1961, 1962, **2007**, **2011**, 2016	3	5	.375
Philadelphia Eagles	5	**1981**, **2000**, 2006, 2008, 2022	2	3	.400
Minnesota Vikings	4	**1993**, 1997, **2000**, **2022**	3	1	.750
New England Patriots	2	**2007**, **2011**	2	0	1.000
Washington Commanders	2	1943, **1986**	1	1	.500
Cleveland Browns	2	1950, **1958**	1	1	.500
Los Angeles Rams	2	**1984**, 1989	1	1	.500
Indianapolis Colts	2	1958, 1959	0	2	.000
Denver Broncos	1	**1986**	1	0	1.000
Buffalo Bills	1	**1990**	1	0	1.000
Dallas Cowboys	1	**2007**	1	0	1.000
Tampa Bay Buccaneers	1	**2007**	1	0	1.000
Atlanta Falcons	1	**2011**	1	0	1.000
Detroit Lions	1	1935	0	1	.000
Baltimore Ravens	1	2000	0	1	.000
Carolina Panthers	1	2005	0	1	.000
Totals	51		25	26	.490

== New York Jets ==
Opponent	G	Occurrences	W	L	%
Indianapolis Colts	4	**1968**, **2002**, 2009, **2010**	3	1	.750
Las Vegas Raiders	4	**1968**, **1982**, 2001, 2002	2	2	.500
New England Patriots	3	1985, 2006, **2010**	1	2	.333
Cincinnati Bengals	2	**1982**, **2009**	2	0	1.000
Los Angeles Chargers	2	**2004**, **2009**	2	0	1.000
Kansas City Chiefs	2	1969, **1986**	1	1	.500
Pittsburgh Steelers	2	2004, 2010	0	2	.000
Jacksonville Jaguars	1	**1998**	1	0	1.000
Buffalo Bills	1	1981	0	1	.000
Miami Dolphins	1	1982	0	1	.000
Cleveland Browns	1	1986	0	1	.000
Tennessee Titans	1	1991	0	1	.000
Denver Broncos	1	1998	0	1	.000
Totals	25		12	13	.480

== Philadelphia Eagles ==
Opponent	G	Occurrences	W	L	%
Tampa Bay Buccaneers	6	1979, **2000**, **2001**, 2002, 2021, 2023	2	4	.333
New York Giants	5	1981, 2000, **2006**, **2008**, **2022**	3	2	.600
Minnesota Vikings	4	**1980**, **2004**, **2008**, **2017**	4	0	1.000
Green Bay Packers	4	**1960**, **2003**, 2010, **2024**	3	1	.750
Atlanta Falcons	4	1978, **2002**, **2004**, **2017**	3	1	.750
Chicago Bears	4	**1979**, 1988, **2001**, **2018**	3	1	.750
Los Angeles Rams	4	**1949**, 1989, 2001, **2024**	2	2	.500
Dallas Cowboys	4	**1980**, 1992, 1995, 2009	1	3	.250
New Orleans Saints	4	**1992**, 2006, 2013, 2018	1	3	.250
Arizona Cardinals	3	1947, **1948**, 2008	1	2	.333
San Francisco 49ers	3	1996, **2022**, 2025	1	2	.333
New England Patriots	2	2004, **2017**	1	1	.500
Washington Commanders	2	1990, **2024**	1	1	.500
Kansas City Chiefs	2	2022, **2024**	1	1	.500
Pittsburgh Steelers	1	**1947**	1	0	1.000
Detroit Lions	1	**1995**	1	0	1.000
Las Vegas Raiders	1	1980	0	1	.000
Carolina Panthers	1	2003	0	1	.000
Seattle Seahawks	1	2019	0	1	.000
Totals	56		29	27	.518

== Pittsburgh Steelers ==
Opponent	G	Occurrences	W	L	%
Denver Broncos	8	1977, **1978**, **1984**, 1989, 1997, **2005**, 2011, 2015	3	5	.375
Las Vegas Raiders	6	**1972**, 1973, **1974**, **1975**, 1976, 1983	3	3	.500
Indianapolis Colts	5	**1975**, **1976**, **1995**, **1996**, **2005**	5	0	1.000
Baltimore Ravens	5	**2001**, **2008**, **2010**, 2014, 2024	3	2	.600
New England Patriots	5	1996, **1997**, 2001, 2004, 2016	1	4	.200
Tennessee Titans	4	**1978**, **1979**, **1989**, 2002	3	1	.750
Miami Dolphins	4	1972, **1979**, 1984, **2016**	2	2	.500
Buffalo Bills	4	**1974**, 1992, **1995**, 2023	2	2	.667
Dallas Cowboys	3	**1975**, **1978**, 1995	2	1	.667
Cleveland Browns	3	**1994**, **2002**, 2020	2	1	.667
Los Angeles Chargers	3	1982, 1994, **2008**	1	2	.333
Kansas City Chiefs	3	1993, **2016**, 2021	1	2	.333
New York Jets	2	**2004**, **2010**	2	0	1.000
Cincinnati Bengals	2	**2005**, **2015**	2	0	1.000
Jacksonville Jaguars	2	2007, 2017	0	2	.000
Minnesota Vikings	1	**1974**	1	0	1.000
Los Angeles Rams	1	**1979**	1	0	1.000
Seattle Seahawks	1	**2005**	1	0	1.000
Arizona Cardinals	1	**2008**	1	0	1.000
Philadelphia Eagles	1	1947	0	1	.000
Green Bay Packers	1	2010	0	1	.000
Houston Texans	1	2025	0	1	.000
Totals	66		36	30	.545

== San Francisco 49ers ==
Opponent	G	Occurrences	W	L	%
Green Bay Packers	10	1995, 1996, 1997, **1998**, 2001, **2012**, **2013**, **2019**, **2021**, **2023**	6	4	.600
Dallas Cowboys	9	1970, 1971, 1972, **1981**, 1992, 1993, **1994**, **2021**, **2022**	4	5	.444
New York Giants	8	**1981**, **1984**, 1985, 1986, 1990, **1993**, **2002**, 2011	4	4	.500
Minnesota Vikings	6	**1970**, 1987, **1988**, **1989**, **1997**, **2019**	5	1	.833
Washington Commanders	4	**1971**, 1983, **1990**, **1992**	3	1	.750
Chicago Bears	3	**1984**, **1988**, **1994**	3	0	1.000
Detroit Lions	3	1957, **1983**, **2023**	2	1	.667
Philadelphia Eagles	3	**1996**, 2022, **2025**	2	1	.667
Seattle Seahawks	3	2013, **2022**, 2025	1	2	.333
Cincinnati Bengals	2	**1981**, **1988**	2	0	1.000
Los Angeles Rams	2	**1989**, 2021	1	1	.500
Atlanta Falcons	2	1998, **2012**	1	1	.500
Kansas City Chiefs	2	2019, 2023	0	2	.000
New York Yankees	1	**1949**	1	0	1.000
Miami Dolphins	1	**1984**	1	0	1.000
Denver Broncos	1	**1989**	1	0	1.000
Los Angeles Chargers	1	**1994**	1	0	1.000
New Orleans Saints	1	**2011**	1	0	1.000
Carolina Panthers	1	**2013**	1	0	1.000
Cleveland Browns	1	1949	0	1	.000
Tampa Bay Buccaneers	1	2002	0	1	.000
Baltimore Ravens	1	2012	0	1	.000
Totals	66		40	26	.606

== Seattle Seahawks ==
Opponent	G	Occurrences	W	L	%
Green Bay Packers	4	2003, 2007, **2014**, 2019	1	3	.250
Washington Commanders	3	**2005**, **2007**, **2012**	3	0	1.000
Carolina Panthers	3	**2005**, **2014**, 2015	2	1	.667
San Francisco 49ers	3	**2013**, 2022, **2025**	2	1	.667
Miami Dolphins	3	**1983**, 1984, 1999	1	2	.333
Los Angeles Rams	3	2004, 2020, **2025**	1	2	.333
Denver Broncos	2	**1983**, **2013**	2	0	1.000
New Orleans Saints	2	**2010**, **2013**	2	0	1.000
Las Vegas Raiders	2	1983, **1984**	1	1	.500
Dallas Cowboys	2	**2006**, 2018	1	1	.500
New England Patriots	2	2014, **2025**	1	1	.500
Chicago Bears	2	2006, 2010	0	2	.000
Atlanta Falcons	2	2012, 2016	0	2	.000
Minnesota Vikings	1	**2015**	1	0	1.000
Detroit Lions	1	**2016**	1	0	1.000
Philadelphia Eagles	1	**2019**	1	0	1.000
Tennessee Titans	1	1987	0	1	.000
Cincinnati Bengals	1	1988	0	1	.000
Pittsburgh Steelers	1	2005	0	1	.000
Totals	39		20	19	.513

== Tampa Bay Buccaneers ==
Opponent	G	Occurrences	W	L	%
Philadelphia Eagles	6	**1979**, 2000, 2001, **2002**, **2021**, **2023**	4	2	.667
Washington Commanders	4	**1999**, 2005, **2020**, 2024	2	2	.500
Los Angeles Rams	3	1979, 1999, 2021	0	3	.000
Dallas Cowboys	3	1981, 1982, 2022	0	3	.000
Green Bay Packers	2	1997, **2020**	1	1	.500
Detroit Lions	2	**1997**, 2023	1	1	.500
Las Vegas Raiders	1	**2002**	1	0	1.000
San Francisco 49ers	1	**2002**	1	0	1.000
New Orleans Saints	1	**2020**	1	0	1.000
Kansas City Chiefs	1	**2020**	1	0	1.000
New York Giants	1	2007	0	1	.000
Totals	25		12	13	.480

== Tennessee Titans ==
Opponent	G	Occurrences	W	L	%
Baltimore Ravens	5	2000, **2003**, 2008, **2019**, 2020	2	3	.400
Los Angeles Chargers	4	**1960**, **1961**, **1979**, 2007	3	1	.750
New England Patriots	4	**1978**, 2003, 2017, **2019**	2	2	.500
Kansas City Chiefs	4	1962, 1993, **2017**, 2019	1	3	.250
Pittsburgh Steelers	4	1978, 1979, 1989, **2002**	1	3	.250
Las Vegas Raiders	4	1967, 1969, 1980, 2002	0	4	.000
Denver Broncos	3	**1979**, 1987, 1991	1	2	.333
Buffalo Bills	3	1988, 1992, **1999**	1	2	.333
Cincinnati Bengals	2	1990, 2021	0	2	.000
Miami Dolphins	1	**1978**	1	0	1.000
Seattle Seahawks	1	**1987**	1	0	1.000
Cleveland Browns	1	**1988**	1	0	1.000
New York Jets	1	**1991**	1	0	1.000
Indianapolis Colts	1	**1999**	1	0	1.000
Jacksonville Jaguars	1	**1999**	1	0	1.000
Los Angeles Rams	1	1999	0	1	.000
Totals	40		17	23	.425

== Washington Commanders ==
Opponent	G	Occurrences	W	L	%
Chicago Bears	7	**1937**, 1940, **1942**, 1943, 1984, **1986**, **1987**	4	3	.571
Minnesota Vikings	5	1973, 1976, **1982**, **1987**, **1992**	3	2	.600
Detroit Lions	4	**1982**, **1991**, **1999**, **2024**	4	0	1.000
Los Angeles Rams	4	1945, 1974, **1983**, **1986**	2	2	.500
Tampa Bay Buccaneers	4	1999, **2005**, 2020, **2024**	2	2	.500
San Francisco 49ers	4	1971, **1983**, 1990, 1992	1	3	.250
Green Bay Packers	3	1936, **1972**, 2015	1	2	.333
Seattle Seahawks	3	2005, 2007, 2012	0	3	.000
Dallas Cowboys	2	**1972**, **1982**	2	0	1.000
New York Giants	2	**1943**, 1986	1	1	.500
Miami Dolphins	2	1972, **1982**	1	1	.500
Philadelphia Eagles	2	**1990**, 2024	1	1	.500
Denver Broncos	1	**1987**	1	0	1.000
Atlanta Falcons	1	**1991**	1	0	1.000
Buffalo Bills	1	**1991**	1	0	1.000
Las Vegas Raiders	1	1983	0	1	.000
Totals	46		25	21	.543

== Most frequent matchups ==
Total	Team	Record	Team	Last occurrence	National Football League rivalries
10	San Francisco 49ers	6–4	Green Bay Packers	2023	49ers–Packers rivalry
9	Los Angeles Rams	5–4	Dallas Cowboys	2018	Cowboys–Rams rivalry
9	Dallas Cowboys	5–4	San Francisco 49ers	2022	49ers–Cowboys rivalry
9	Green Bay Packers	5–4	Dallas Cowboys	2023	Cowboys–Packers rivalry
8	Chicago Bears	5–3	New York Giants	1990	Bears–Giants rivalry
8	Denver Broncos	5–3	Pittsburgh Steelers	2015	Broncos–Steelers rivalry
8	Green Bay Packers	5–3	New York Giants	2016	Giants–Packers rivalry
8	Minnesota Vikings	5–3	Los Angeles Rams	2024	Rams–Vikings rivalry
8	San Francisco 49ers	4–4	New York Giants	2011	49ers–Giants rivalry
7	Kansas City Chiefs	5–2	Buffalo Bills	2024	Bills–Chiefs rivalry
7	Dallas Cowboys	4–3	Minnesota Vikings	2009	Cowboys–Vikings rivalry
7	Washington Commanders	4–3	Chicago Bears	1987	
6	San Francisco 49ers	5–1	Minnesota Vikings	2019	
6	Tampa Bay Buccaneers	4–2	Philadelphia Eagles	2023	
6	Denver Broncos	4–2	New England Patriots	2025	
6	Pittsburgh Steelers	3–3	Las Vegas Raiders	1983	Raiders–Steelers rivalry

== See also ==
- List of MLB postseason series
- List of NBA playoff series
- List of NHL playoff series
