= Giants–Yankees rivalry =

Major League Baseball rivalry

- San Francisco Giants New York Yankees
- First meeting: World Series: October 5, 1921; Polo Grounds, New York, New York; Yankees 3, Giants 0 Regular season: June 7, 2002; Yankee Stadium (I), New York, New York; Yankees 2, Giants 1
- Latest meeting: March 28, 2026; Oracle Park, San Francisco, California; Yankees 3, Giants 1
- Next meeting: 2027; Yankee Stadium, New York, New York
- Stadiums: Historical (New York City): Giants: Polo Grounds (IV); Yankees: Polo Grounds (IV) (to 1922) Yankee Stadium (I) (from 1923); Current: Giants: Oracle Park; Yankees: Yankee Stadium (II)

Statistics
- Total meetings: 70 (World Series: 43, regular season: 27)
- All-time series: Yankees, 42–27–1 (.607)
- Regular season series: Yankees, 19–8 (.704)
- Postseason results: Yankees, 23–19–1 (.547)
- Largest victory: Overall: Giants, 13–5 (World Series–October 7, 1921); Yankees, 18–4 (World Series–October 2, 1936); Regular Season only: Giants, 9–1 (April 11, 2025); Yankees, 6–0 (September 21, 2013), 11–5 (April 28, 2019), 6–0 (April 2, 2023)
- Longest win streak: Overall: Giants, 4 (World Series–October 11, 1921 – World Series–October 4, 1922), (World Series–October 6, 1922 – World Series–October 10, 1923); Yankees, 5 (July 24, 2016–March 30, 2023); Regular Season only: Giants, 2 (June 23–24, 2007); Yankees, 5 (July 24, 2016–March 30, 2023)
- Current win streak: Yankees, 3

Post-season history
- 1921 World Series: Giants defeat Yankees, 5–3; 1922 World Series: Giants defeat Yankees, 4–0–1; 1923 World Series: Yankees defeat Giants, 4–2; 1936 World Series: Yankees defeat Giants, 4–2; 1937 World Series: Yankees defeat Giants, 4–1; 1951 World Series: Yankees defeat Giants, 4–2; 1962 World Series: Yankees defeat Giants, 4–3

Locations of the San Francisco Giants and New York Yankees

The Giants–Yankees rivalry is a Major League Baseball rivalry between the San Francisco Giants of the National League (NL) and the New York Yankees of the American League (AL). It was particularly intense when both teams not only inhabited New York City but also, for a time, the same ball park. During that era the opportunities for them to meet could only have been in a World Series. Both teams kicked off the first Subway Series between the two leagues in 1921.

== Cross-town Rivals ==
=== Highlanders Come to Town ===
The American League was at its infancy at the start of the 20th century. The current Yankees franchise had its origins in Baltimore as the Baltimore Orioles. At the time, rivalry between the National League and the American League was fierce. In 1902, long time National League executive John T. Brush gained a partial ownership interest in the Orioles, and released four key team members – Hall of Fame manager John McGraw, Hall of Fame pitcher Joe McGinnity, Hall of Fame catcher Roger Bresnahan and starting first baseman Dan McGann—from their Orioles' contract to join the National League New York Giants. Brush also allowed other Orioles' players to join other National League teams. Later that year, Brush became owner of the Giants.

The fledgling league realized they needed to capitalize on the big market of New York City and American League president Ban Johnson wanted revenge on McGraw and Brush for their antics with the Orioles. So the American League moved the Orioles to New York, where the established National League Giants and the Brooklyn Dodgers teams were already located, over the Giants' and Dodgers' objections and despite their efforts to use their political influence within New York to prevent the move. The team was eventually called the Highlanders due to their homefield being on Hilltop Park from 1903–12. The Highlanders had a successful season in 1904 and were just one game away from winning the pennant that year. Highlanders star pitcher Jack Chesbro, who had won 41 games that year (an AL record that still stands today), was pitching in the bottom of the 9th inning to their eventual fierce rival the Boston Americans. One of Chesbro's spitballs got away allowing Boston to score and win the game and pennant on the wild pitch. The modern day World Series was played in 1903 between the winners of the American League and the National League, but when the Giants won the NL pennant in 1904 they refused to play Boston in the fall classic. Giants' owner Brush stated "There is nothing in the constitution or playing rules of the National League which requires its victorious club to submit its championship honors to a contest with a victorious club in a minor league." This move by the Giants made the 1905 season as the first one to have the World Series as the official matchup between the winners of the American and National Leagues.

=== Two Teams, One Field ===
The Giants briefly shared Hilltop Park as a home for two months in 1911 when the Polo Grounds was under reconstruction from a fire and relations between the two teams had warmed as a result. This paved way for the Highlanders to move into the new Polo Grounds in 1913. Now playing on the Harlem River, a far cry from their high-altitude home, the name "Highlanders" no longer applied, and fell into disuse among the press. The media had already widely adopted the "Yankees" nickname coined by the New York Press, and in 1913 the team became officially known as the New York Yankees.

By the mid-1910s, Yankees owners Farrell and Devery had become estranged and were both in need of money. At the start of 1915, they sold the team to Colonel Jacob Ruppert and Captain Tillinghast L'Hommedieu Huston for $463,000. Ruppert inherited a brewery fortune while Huston made his money as an engineer in Cuba after the Spanish–American War, providing the Yankees with an owner who possessed deep pockets and a willingness to dig into them to produce a winning team by making moves such as acquiring Boston star Babe Ruth in 1918.

== First World Series meetings and eviction ==
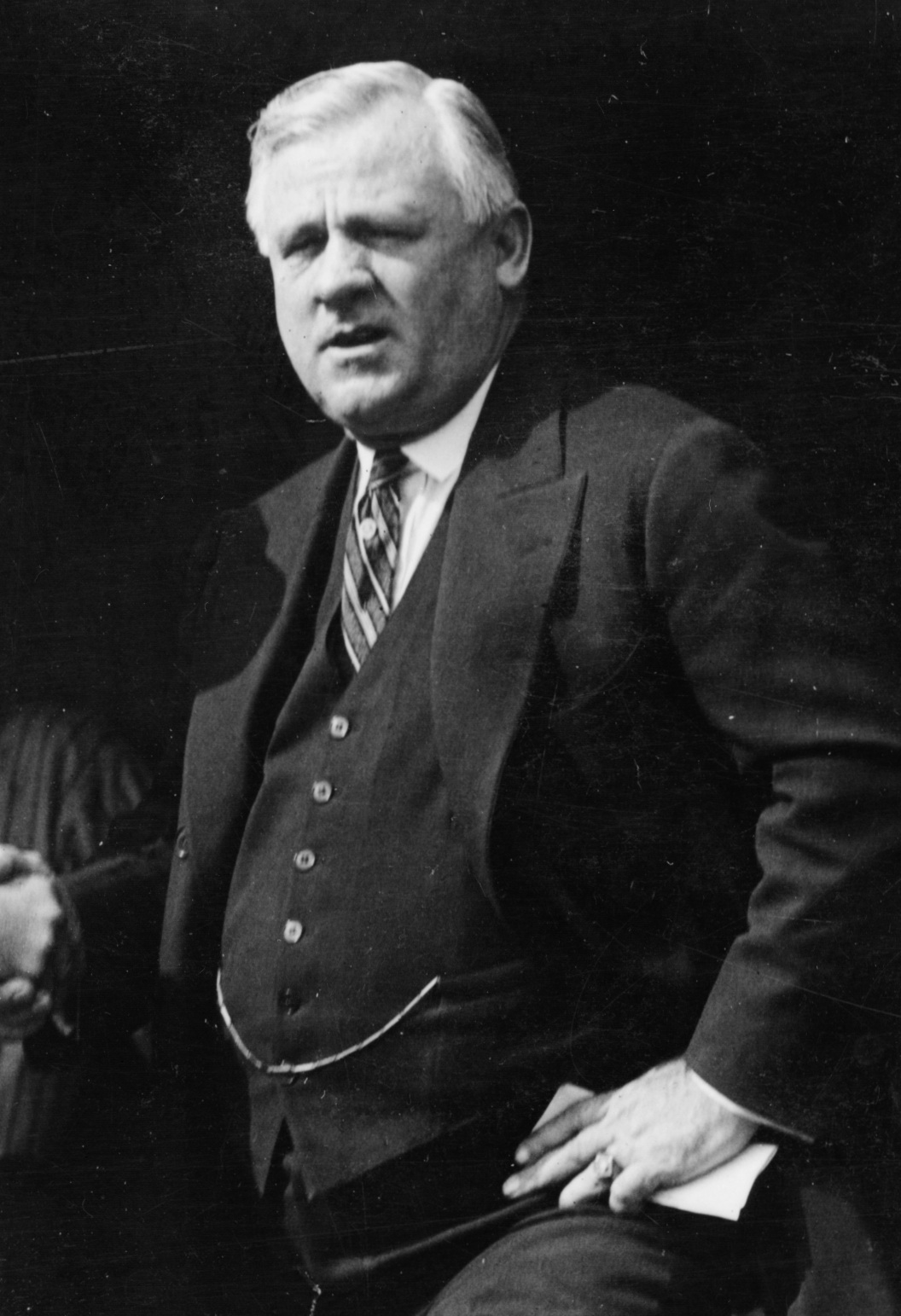
Giants Manager John McGraw ordered the Yankees out of the Polo Grounds. They moved to Yankee Stadium after the notice.

=== Eviction notice and 1921 World Series ===
The home run-hitting exploits of Ruth proved so popular with the public that they began drawing more people than their landlords, the Giants. By the middle of 1920, the Giants had issued both an initial eviction notice which was soon rescinded and a temporary lease extension to the Yankees, allowing them to remain at the Polo Grounds until the end of 1922, when the Giants had planned to renovate the stadium and increase seating capacity from 38,000 to 50,000.

The Giants' future Hall of Fame manager John McGraw hated the Yankees' slugging style of Ruth as opposed to the strategy of the dead ball era, and was said to have commented that the Yankees should "move to some out-of-the-way place, like Queens." Meanwhile, Ruppert's investments paid off when the Yankees won their first AL pennant in 1921. This resulted in the inauguration of the heated Subway Series as previous matchups between the Giants and Brooklyn Dodgers were not referred to as Subway Series. The Yankees' matchup in the 1921 World Series were none other than their landlords, the Giants. This series saw the likes of several other future Hall of Famers in addition to Ruth and McGraw including Giants players Dave Bancroft, Frankie Frisch, George Kelly and Ross Youngs and Giants coaches Jesse Burkett, Christy Mathewson and Hughie Jennings, while Miller Huggins and Home Run Baker rounded out the Yankees. This series was also the last of the experimental best-of-nine format, with the Giants winning the championship five games to the Yankees' three.

=== 1922 World Series: McGraw's last win ===
In 1922, the Yankees returned to the World Series, losing again to the Giants for the second straight year. The Giants showed talents from their previous year in addition to eventual Hall of Fame player Travis Jackson. There was also a Giants player who would become a Hall of Fame manager for the Yankees, Casey Stengel. The Yankees themselves saw the addition of a future Hall of Famer to their team in pitcher Waite Hoyt. The series was known to be controversial as it had the third and final tie game in World Series history when the game was called because of darkness. Conspiratorial allegations of impropriety of ticket sales had surfaced as a result of the game being called, causing Commissioner Landis to order proceeds to go to charities funding reconstruction efforts of World War I.

Meanwhile, the Yankees had broken ground for a new ballpark in the Bronx, right across the Harlem River from the Polo Grounds. The construction crew moved with remarkable speed and finished the new ballpark in less than a year.

== Yankees move to the Bronx ==
=== 1923 World Series: Yankees First World Series Championship ===
The Yankees moved from Manhattan borough to the Bronx with the opening of Yankee Stadium where, with their star Babe Ruth, they drew larger crowds than ever before. Their first year saw Ruth and future Hall of Famer Herb Pennock lead them to win their first World Series ever over none other than the Giants. Between the two teams, three rookies would eventually be inducted into the Hall of Fame but who did not play in the series: Bill Terry and Hack Wilson for the Giants and Lou Gehrig for the Yankees.

=== 1936 World Series: New Legends Born ===
The teams went on to meet again in the fall classic over a decade later. Ruth had retired from baseball two years earlier and this was Joe DiMaggio's first. Giants Hall of Fame pitcher Carl Hubbell had won the first game for the Giants, but the Yankees rallied behind future Hall of Famers management of Joe McCarthy and the players Bill Dickey, Lefty Gomez, Tony Lazzeri, Red Ruffing and newly acquired left fielder Jake Powell's .455 avg, 10 hits, 8 runs and 4 walks to overwhelm Hubbell, Jackson and Giants legend Mel Ott to win the series 4 games to 2.

=== 1937 World Series: Legends Last Hurrahs ===
Both teams met again this year in the classic. It was Gehrig's last outstanding season before amyotrophic lateral sclerosis (ALS) deteriorated his career. Gehrig's last World Series home run would be in this series off of Carl Hubbell in Hubbell's last inning pitched in the World Series. The Yankees became the first team in history to not commit any errors the entire series and eventually passed the Boston Red Sox and the Philadelphia Athletics for the most World Series wins, second only to the St. Louis Cardinals at the time.

When Gehrig retired, he received gifts from the Giants organization. In his famous farewell speech two years later spoke of the rivalry:

When the New York Giants, a team you would give your right arm to beat, and vice versa, sends you a gift – that's something.

=== Mel Allen ===
In June 1939, announcer Mel Allen was hired by both teams to conduct play by play radio broadcasts. Allen was able to be the voice of broadcasts for both teams due to only home games being broadcast at the time. Allen would continue to broadcast for both the Giants and the Yankees until his entry into World War II in 1941. Upon his return, Allen only did Yankee broadcasts full-time up until 1964.

=== 1951 World Series: The Last Giants–Yankees Subway Series, Passing of the Torch ===
Former locations of the New York Giants and New York Yankees

Both teams met again in the 1951 World Series in what was a matchup of eccentric Hall of Fame managers. Leo Durocher of the Giants had led the Giants to the fall classic over Bobby Thomson's famous Shot Heard 'Round the World home run against the Brooklyn Dodgers. The Yankees had former Giants player Casey Stengel managing them. The Series would be the last for Joe DiMaggio and the first for the legendary Hall of Famers Mickey Mantle and Willie Mays. Several other All-Stars played, including Jim Hearn, Sal Maglie, Larry Jansen, Whitey Lockman, Alvin Dark and future Hall of Famer Monte Irvin for the Giants while Allie Reynolds, Vic Raschi, Gil McDougald, Eddie Lopat and future Hall of Famer Phil Rizzuto wore Yankee pinstripes.

The series proved to be the last Subway Series between the two clubs.

The Giants would bounce back in 1954 to win the World Series over the Cleveland Indians in one of the finest seasons for a team. That would be their last World Series win in New York as well as franchise history up until 2010.

== Giants leave New York for San Francisco ==
The Giants had been contemplating a move from New York when they were seeking a new stadium away from the crumbling Polo Grounds. Initially, Giants ownership was thinking of moving to Minnesota. However, San Francisco had its mayor at the time, George Christopher, approach the Giants about relocation to San Francisco. Brooklyn Dodgers owner Walter O'Malley had already been in negotiations with the city of Los Angeles to move the Dodgers there. MLB would not authorize the move unless a second team would also move to California. In an effort to preserve their fierce rivalry, majority owner Horace Stoneham caved in and announced the move.

Joan Whitney Payson and M. Donald Grant were the only members of the Giants' ownership board who objected. They both eventually would become part of the ownership of the new New York baseball team 5 years later, the New York Mets, who would adopt the Giants' orange interlocking NY logo and their orange trim (mingled with royal blue from the Dodgers).

=== 1962 World Series: The rivalry goes cross-country ===
The Yankees and Giants met for their first World Series in 1962 since the Giants had left. The series was closely contested by both teams. The Giants had better statistics in ERA, batting average (where the Yankees had one of the worst postseason averages ever) and all categories of extra base hits yet wound up losing the series in 7 games. It was remembered for a then record 13-day series due to excessive rainfall in both cities. Hall of Famers Yogi Berra, Whitey Ford, Orlando Cepeda, Juan Marichal and Willie McCovey joined Mantle and Mays in the rivalry. The final game featured a good defensive play by Roger Maris, who had just broken Babe Ruth's single season home run record the year prior. With the Yankees leading 1–0 and Matty Alou on first, Willie Mays doubled toward the right-field line. Maris cut off the ball and made a strong throw to prevent Alou from scoring the tying run; the play set up Willie McCovey's series-ending line drive to second baseman Bobby Richardson in what would be their last World Series matchup to date.

== Season-by-season results ==
Giants vs. Yankees Season-by-Season Results
1920s (Giants, 11–7–1)

Season	Season series		at New York Giants	at New York Yankees	Overall series	Notes
1921 World Series	Giants	4‍–‍1	Tie, 2‍–‍2	Giants, 3‍–‍1	Giants; 5‍–‍3	First postseason meeting and Subway Series between the two teams, first Giants win
1922 World Series	Giants	4‍–‍0‍–‍1	Giants, 3‍–‍0	Giants, 1‍–‍0‍–‍1	Giants; 9‍–‍3‍–‍1	Second postseason meeting
1923 World Series	Yankees	4‍–‍2	Yankees, 3‍–‍0	Giants, 2‍–‍1	Giants; 11‍–‍7‍–‍1	Third postseason meeting, first Yankees win

1930s (Yankees, 8–3)

Season	Season series		at New York Giants	at New York Yankees	Overall series	Notes
1936 World Series	Yankees	4‍–‍2	Yankees, 2‍–‍1	Yankees, 2‍–‍1	Giants; 13‍–‍11‍–‍1	Fourth postseason meeting
1937 World Series	Yankees	4‍–‍1	Yankees, 2‍–‍1	Yankees, 2‍–‍0	Yankees; 15‍–‍14‍–‍1	Fifth postseason meeting

1950s (Yankees, 4–2)

Season	Season series		at New York Giants	at New York Yankees	Overall series	Notes
1951 World Series	Yankees	4‍–‍2	Yankees, 2‍–‍1	Yankees, 2‍–‍1	Yankees; 19‍–‍16‍–‍1	Sixth postseason meeting, last Subway Series

1960s (Yankees, 4–3)

Season	Season series		at San Francisco Giants	at New York Yankees	Overall series	Notes
1962 World Series	Yankees	4‍–‍3	Tie, 2‍–‍2	Yankees, 2‍–‍1	Yankees; 23‍–‍19‍–‍1	Seventh postseason meeting

2000s (Tie, 3–3)

Season	Season series		at San Francisco Giants	at New York Yankees	Overall series	Notes
2002	Yankees	2‍–‍1	no games	Yankees, 2‍–‍1	Yankees; 25‍–‍20‍–‍1	Giants lose 2002 World Series
2007	Giants	2‍–‍1	Giants, 2‍–‍1	no games	Yankees; 26‍–‍22‍–‍1	

2010s (Yankees, 7–2)

Season	Season series		at San Francisco Giants	at New York Yankees	Overall series	Notes
2013	Yankees	2‍–‍1	no games	Yankees, 2‍–‍1	Yankees; 28‍–‍23‍–‍1	
2016	Yankees	2‍–‍1	no games	Yankees, 2‍–‍1	Yankees; 30‍–‍24‍–‍1	
2019	Yankees	3‍–‍0	Yankees, 3‍–‍0	no games	Yankees; 33‍–‍24‍–‍1	

2020s (Yankees, 9–3)

Season	Season series		at San Francisco Giants	at New York Yankees	Overall series	Notes
2023	Yankees	2‍–‍1	no games	Yankees, 2‍–‍1	Yankees; 35‍–‍25‍–‍1	Permanent adoption of the three-game series format, with each ballpark alternating every season.
2024	Yankees	3‍–‍0	Yankees, 3‍–‍0	no games	Yankees; 38‍–‍25‍–‍1	Yankees lose 2024 World Series
2025	Giants	2‍–‍1	no games	Giants, 2‍–‍1	Yankees; 39‍–‍27‍–‍1	
2026	Yankees	3‍–‍0	Yankees, 3‍–‍0	no games	Yankees; 42‍–‍27‍–‍1	

Summary of Results

Season	Season series		at San Francisco Giants	at New York Yankees	Notes
Regular season games	Yankees	19‍–‍8	Yankees, 10‍–‍2	Yankees, 9‍–‍6	
Postseason games	Yankees	23‍–‍19‍–‍1	Yankees, 13‍–‍10	Yankees, 10‍–‍9‍–‍1	
Postseason series	Yankees	5‍–‍2	Yankees, 4‍–‍1‍–‍2	Yankees, 4‍–‍3	World Series: 1921, 1922, 1923, 1936, 1937, 1951, 1962
Regular and postseason	Yankees	42‍–‍27‍–‍1	Yankees, 23‍–‍12	Yankees, 19‍–‍15‍–‍1	

== See also ==
- Major League Baseball rivalries
- Subway Series
- Dodgers–Yankees rivalry
- Mets–Yankees rivalry
- History of the New York Giants
- History of the San Francisco Giants
- History of the New York Yankees
- 49ers–Giants rivalry, a football rivalry between NFL teams the San Francisco 49ers and New York Giants (the latter of whom was named after the Giants baseball team)
