= List of NBA playoff series =

This is a complete listing of National Basketball Association (NBA) playoff series, grouped by franchise. Series featuring relocated and renamed teams (Note: Series featuring the Atlanta Hawks include series played as the Tri-Cities Blackhawks (1949–1951), Milwaukee Hawks (1951–1955) and St. Louis Hawks (1955–1968); series featuring the Brooklyn Nets include series played as the New Jersey Nets (1977–2012); series featuring the Charlotte Hornets include series played as the Charlotte Bobcats (2004–2014); series featuring the Detroit Pistons include series played as the Fort Wayne Pistons (1948–1957); series featuring the Golden State Warriors include series played as the Philadelphia Warriors (1946–1962) and San Francisco Warriors (1962–1971); series featuring the Houston Rockets include series played as the San Diego Rockets (1967–1971); series featuring the Los Angeles Clippers include series played as the Buffalo Braves (1970–1978); series featuring the Los Angeles Lakers include series played as the Minneapolis Lakers (1948–1960); series featuring the New Orleans Pelicans include series played as the New Orleans Hornets (2002–2013); series featuring the Oklahoma City Thunder include series played as the Seattle SuperSonics (1967–2008); series featuring the Philadelphia 76ers include series played as the Syracuse Nationals (1949–1963); series featuring the Sacramento Kings include series played as the Rochester Royals (1948–1957), Cincinnati Royals (1957–1972), Kansas City-Omaha Kings (1972–1975) and Kansas City Kings (1975–1985); series featuring the Washington Wizards include series played as the Baltimore Bullets (1963–1973), Capital Bullets (1973–1974) and Washington Bullets (1974–1997).) are kept with their ultimate relocation franchises. Bolded years indicate wins. Years in italics indicate series in progress. Tables are sorted first by the number of series, then the number of wins, and then by year of first occurrence. This also does not list any of the play-in games, as while they are postseason games, the league considers them different from the main tournament.

== Atlanta Hawks ==
Opponent	S	Occurrences	GP	Rec	%
Boston Celtics	13	1957, **1958**, 1960, 1961, 1972, 1973, 1983, 1986, 1988, 2008, 2012, **2016**, 2023	77	2–11	.167
Los Angeles Lakers	10	**1956**, **1957**, 1959, **1960**, **1961**, 1963, **1964**, 1966, 1969, 1970	56	5–5	.500
Detroit Pistons	8	1956, **1958**, **1963**, **1986**, 1987, 1991, **1997**, **1999**	39	5–3	.625
Washington Wizards	6	1965, **1966**, 1978, 1979, **2015**, 2017	28	2–4	.333
Indiana Pacers	6	**1987**, 1994, 1995, **1996**, 2013, 2014	31	2–4	.333
Chicago Bulls	5	**1967**, **1970**, 1993, 1997, 2011	22	2–3	.400
Milwaukee Bucks	5	1984, **1988**, 1989, **2010**, 2021	28	2–3	.500
New York Knicks	4	1971, 1999, **2021**, 2026	20	1–3	.250
Miami Heat	3	**1994**, **2009**, 2022	17	2–1	.667
Orlando Magic	3	1996, 2010, **2011**	15	1–2	.333
Philadelphia 76ers	3	1980, 1982, **2021**	14	1–2	.333
Golden State Warriors	3	1964, 1967, 1968	19	0–3	.000
Cleveland Cavaliers	3	2009, 2015, 2016	12	0–3	.000
Houston Rockets	2	**1969**, **1979**	8	2–0	1.000
Brooklyn Nets	1	**2015**	6	1–0	1.000
Anderson Packers	1	1950	3	0–1	.000
Charlotte Hornets	1	1998	4	0–1	.000
Totals (Note: Games played totals against Minneapolis (Los Angeles Lakers) include a tiebreaker game from the 1956 and 1957 NBA playoffs. Games played totals against Fort Wayne (Detroit Pistons) include a tiebreaker game from the 1957 NBA playoffs. As these games were played only to determine playoff seeding, they are not considered to be a complete series and are not counted in the occurrences section or the total series win–loss records.)	77		388	28–49	.364

== Boston Celtics ==
Opponent	S	Occurrences	GP	Rec	%
Philadelphia 76ers	23	**1953**, 1954, 1955, 1956, **1957**, **1959**, **1961**, **1965**, **1966**, 1967, **1968**, **1969**, 1977, 1980, **1981**, 1982, **1985**, **2002**, **2012**, **2018**, **2020**, **2023**, 2026	123	15–8	.652
New York Knicks	15	1951, 1952, 1953, **1955**, **1967**, **1969**, 1972, 1973, **1974**, **1984**, **1988**, 1990, **2011**, 2013, 2025	73	7–8	.467
Atlanta Hawks	13	**1957**, 1958, **1960**, **1961**, **1972**, **1973**, **1983**, **1986**, **1988**, **2008**, **2012**, 2016, **2023**	77	11–2	.833
Los Angeles Lakers	12	**1959**, **1962**, **1963**, **1965**, **1966**, **1968**, **1969**, **1984**, 1985, 1987, **2008**, 2010	74	9–3	.750
Cleveland Cavaliers	9	**1976**, **1985**, 1992, **2008**, **2010**, 2015, 2017, 2018, **2024**	51	5–4	.556
Milwaukee Bucks	8	**1974**, 1983, **1984**, **1986**, **1987**, **2018**, 2019, **2022**	46	6–2	.750
Detroit Pistons	8	**1968**, **1985**, **1987**, 1988, 1989, 1991, **2002**, **2008**	45	5–3	.625
Miami Heat	7	**2010**, 2011, 2012, 2020, **2022**, 2023, **2024**	42	3–4	.429
Indiana Pacers	7	**1991**, **1992**, **2003**, 2004, 2005, **2019**, **2024**	33	5–2	.714
Chicago Bulls	5	**1981**, **1986**, **1987**, **2009**, **2017**	23	5–0	1.000
Golden State Warriors	5	**1958**, **1960**, **1962**, **1964**, 2022	29	4–1	.800
Houston Rockets	4	**1975**, **1980**, **1981**, **1986**	21	4–0	1.000
Washington Wizards	4	1975, **1982**, **1984**, **2017**	22	3–1	.750
Brooklyn Nets	4	2002, 2003, 2021, **2022**	19	1–3	.250
Orlando Magic	4	1995, 2009, **2010**, **2025**	22	2–2	.500
Sacramento Kings	3	**1963**, **1964**, **1966**	17	3–0	1.000
Los Angeles Clippers	2	**1974**, **1976**	12	2–0	1.000
Phoenix Suns	1	**1976**	6	1–0	1.000
San Antonio Spurs	1	**1977**	2	1–0	1.000
Toronto Raptors	1	**2020**	7	1–0	1.000
Dallas Mavericks	1	**2024**	5	1-0	1.000
Chicago Stags	1	1948	3	0–1	.000
Charlotte Hornets	1	1993	4	0–1	.000
Totals (Note: Games played totals against Syracuse (Philadelphia 76ers) and New York include two round-robin games from the 1954 NBA playoffs. As these games were played only to determine playoff seeding, they are not considered to be a complete series and are not counted in the occurrences section or the total series win–loss records.)	139		756	94–45	.676

== Brooklyn Nets ==
Opponent	S	Occurrences	GP	Rec	%
Boston Celtics	4	**2002**, **2003**, **2021**, 2022	19	3–1	.750
Milwaukee Bucks	4	1984, 1986, **2003**, 2021	22	1–3	.250
Philadelphia 76ers	4	1979, **1984**, 2019, 2023	16	1–3	.250
Toronto Raptors	3	**2007**, **2014**, 2020	17	2–1	.667
New York Knicks	3	1983, 1994, **2004**	10	1–2	.333
Detroit Pistons	3	1985, **2003**, 2004	14	1–2	.333
Cleveland Cavaliers	3	1992, 1993, 2007	15	0–3	.000
Miami Heat	3	2005, 2006, 2014	14	0–3	.000
Indiana Pacers	2	**2002**, **2006**	11	2–0	1.000
Chicago Bulls	2	1998, 2013	10	0–2	.000
Charlotte Hornets	1	**2002**	5	1–0	1.000
Washington Wizards	1	1982	2	0–1	.000
Los Angeles Lakers	1	2002	4	0–1	.000
San Antonio Spurs	1	2003	6	0–1	.000
Atlanta Hawks	1	2015	6	0–1	.000
Totals	36		171	12–24	.333

== Charlotte Hornets ==
Opponent	S	Occurrences	GP	Rec	%
Miami Heat	3	**2001**, 2014, 2016	14	1–2	.333
Orlando Magic	2	**2002**, 2010	8	1–1	.500
New York Knicks	2	1993, 1997	8	0–2	.000
Chicago Bulls	2	1995, 1998	9	0–2	.000
Boston Celtics	1	**1993**	4	1–0	1.000
Atlanta Hawks	1	**1998**	4	1–0	1.000
Philadelphia 76ers	1	2000	4	0–1	.000
Milwaukee Bucks	1	2001	7	0–1	.000
Brooklyn Nets	1	2002	5	0–1	.000
Totals	14		64	4–10	.286

== Chicago Bulls ==
Opponent	S	Occurrences	GP	Rec	%
New York Knicks	7	**1981**, **1989**, **1991**, **1992**, **1993**, 1994, **1996**	36	6–1	.857
Cleveland Cavaliers	7	**1988**, **1989**, **1992**, **1993**, **1994**, 2010, 2015	34	5–2	.714
Miami Heat	7	**1992**, **1996**, **1997**, 2006, **2007**, 2011, 2013	31	4–3	.571
Detroit Pistons	6	**1974**, 1988, 1989, 1990, **1991**, 2007	35	2–4	.333
Atlanta Hawks	5	1967, 1970, **1993**, **1997**, **2011**	22	3–2	.600
Milwaukee Bucks	5	1974, 1985, **1990**, **2015**, 2022	23	2–3	.400
Los Angeles Lakers	5	1968, 1971, 1972, 1973, **1991**	28	1–4	.200
Boston Celtics	5	1981, 1986, 1987, 2009, 2017	23	0–5	.000
Philadelphia 76ers	3	**1990**, **1991**, 2012	16	2–1	.667
Washington Wizards	3	**1997**, 2005, 2014	14	1–2	.333
Charlotte Hornets	2	**1995**, **1998**	9	2–0	1.000
Utah Jazz	2	**1997**, **1998**	12	2–0	1.000
Indiana Pacers	2	**1998**, **2011**	12	2–0	1.000
Brooklyn Nets	2	**1998**, **2013**	10	2–0	1.000
Portland Trail Blazers	2	1977, **1992**	9	1–1	.500
Orlando Magic	2	1995, **1996**	10	1–1	.500
Sacramento Kings	1	**1975**	6	1–0	1.000
Phoenix Suns	1	**1993**	6	1–0	1.000
Oklahoma City Thunder	1	**1996**	6	1–0	1.000
Golden State Warriors	1	1975	7	0–1	.000
Totals	69		349	39–30	.565

== Cleveland Cavaliers ==
Opponent	S	Occurrences	GP	Rec	%
Boston Celtics	9	1976, 1985, **1992**, 2008, 2010, **2015**, **2017**, **2018**, 2024	51	4–5	.444
Chicago Bulls	7	1988, 1989, 1992, 1993, 1994, **2010**, **2015**	34	2–5	.286
Washington Wizards	5	**1976**, 1977, **2006**, **2007**, **2008**	26	4–1	.800
Detroit Pistons	5	2006, **2007**, **2009**, **2016**, **2026**	28	4–1	.800
New York Knicks	5	1978, 1995, 1996, 2023, 2026	18	0–5	.000
Toronto Raptors	4	**2016**, **2017**, **2018**, **2026**	21	4–0	1.000
Indiana Pacers	4	1998, **2017**, **2018**, 2025	20	2–2	.500
Golden State Warriors	4	2015, **2016**, 2017, 2018	22	1–3	.250
Brooklyn Nets	3	**1992**, **1993**, **2007**	15	3–0	1.000
Atlanta Hawks	3	**2009**, **2015**, **2016**	12	3–0	1.000
Orlando Magic	2	2009, **2024**	13	1–1	.500
Philadelphia 76ers	1	1990	5	0–1	.000
San Antonio Spurs	1	2007	4	0–1	.000
Miami Heat	1	**2025**	4	1–0	1.000
Totals	54		273	29–25	.537

== Dallas Mavericks ==
Opponent	S	Occurrences	GP	Rec	%
San Antonio Spurs	6	2001, 2003, **2006**, **2009**, 2010, 2014	36	2–4	.333
Oklahoma City Thunder	6	**1984**, 1987, **2011**, 2012, 2016, **2024**	29	3–3	.500
Portland Trail Blazers	4	1985, 1990, **2003**, **2011**	20	2–2	.500
Los Angeles Lakers	4	1984, 1986, 1988, **2011**	22	1–3	.250
Utah Jazz	3	**1986**, **2001**, **2022**	15	3–0	1.000
Houston Rockets	3	**1988**, **2005**, 2015	16	2–1	.667
Phoenix Suns	3	2005, **2006**, **2022**	19	2–1	.667
Sacramento Kings	3	2002, **2003**, 2004	17	1–2	.333
Los Angeles Clippers	3	2020, 2021, **2024**	19	1–2	.333
Denver Nuggets	2	**1988**, 2009	11	1–1	.500
Miami Heat	2	2006, **2011**	12	1–1	.500
Golden State Warriors	2	2007, 2022	11	0–2	.000
Minnesota Timberwolves	2	**2002**, **2024**	8	2–0	1.000
Memphis Grizzlies	1	**2006**	4	1–0	1.000
New Orleans Pelicans	1	2008	5	0–1	.000
Boston Celtics	1	2024	5	0–1	.000
Totals	46		251	22–24	.478

== Denver Nuggets ==
Opponent	S	Occurrences	GP	Rec	%
Los Angeles Lakers	9	1979, 1985, 1987, 2008, 2009, 2012, 2020, **2023**, **2024**	42	2–7	.222
San Antonio Spurs	7	1983, **1985**, 1990, 1995, 2005, 2007, **2019**	33	2–5	.286
Utah Jazz	5	1984, **1985**, 1994, 2010, **2020**	30	2–3	.400
Phoenix Suns	5	1982, **1983**, 1989, 2021, **2023**	19	2–3	.400
Oklahoma City Thunder	5	1978, **1988**, **1994**, 2011, 2025	28	2–3	.400
Portland Trail Blazers	4	1977, **1986**, 2019, **2021**	23	2–2	.500
Minnesota Timberwolves	4	2004, **2023**, 2024, 2026	23	1–3	.250
Los Angeles Clippers	3	2006, **2020**, **2025**	19	2–1	.667
Dallas Mavericks	2	1988, **2009**	11	1–1	.500
Golden State Warriors	2	2013, 2022	11	0–2	.000
Milwaukee Bucks	1	**1978**	7	1–0	1.000
New Orleans Pelicans	1	**2009**	5	1–0	1.000
Houston Rockets	1	1986	6	0–1	.000
Miami Heat	1	**2023**	5	1–0	1.000
Totals	49		255	19–30	.388

== Detroit Pistons ==
Opponent	S	Occurrences	GP	Rec	%
Los Angeles Lakers	11	1950, 1953, **1955**, 1957, 1959, 1960, 1961, 1962, 1988, **1989**, **2004**	47	3–8	.273
Atlanta Hawks	8	**1956**, 1958, 1963, 1986, **1987**, **1991**, 1997, 1999	39	3–5	.375
Boston Celtics	8	1968, 1985, 1987, **1988**, **1989**, **1991**, 2002, 2008	45	3–5	.375
Sacramento Kings	6	**1950**, 1951, 1952, **1953**, **1958**, **1962**	18	4–2	.667
Chicago Bulls	6	1974, **1988**, **1989**, **1990**, 1991, **2007**	35	4–2	.667
Milwaukee Bucks	5	**1976**, **1989**, **2004**, **2006**, 2019	21	4–1	.800
Orlando Magic	5	1996, **2003**, **2007**, **2008**, **2026**	26	4–1	.800
Cleveland Cavaliers	5	**2006**, 2007, 2009, 2016, 2026	28	1–4	.200
Philadelphia 76ers	4	1955, **2003**, **2005**, **2008**	24	3–1	.750
New York Knicks	4	1984, **1990**, 1992, 2025	21	1–3	.250
Indiana Pacers	3	**1990**, **2004**, **2005**	15	3–0	1.000
Brooklyn Nets	3	**1985**, 2003, **2004**	14	2–1	.667
Miami Heat	3	2000, **2005**, 2006	16	1–2	.333
Golden State Warriors	3	1956, 1976, 1977	14	0–3	.000
Washington Wizards	2	**1987**, **1988**	8	2–0	1.000
Portland Trail Blazers	1	**1990**	5	1–0	1.000
Toronto Raptors	1	**2002**	5	1–0	1.000
Oklahoma City Thunder	1	1975	3	0–1	.000
San Antonio Spurs	1	2005	7	0–1	.000
Chicago Stags	0		1	0–0	.000
Totals (Note: Games played totals against Minneapolis (Los Angeles Lakers) and Rochester (Sacramento Kings) include two round-robin games from the 1954 NBA playoffs. Games played totals against St. Louis (Atlanta Hawks) include a tiebreaker game from the 1957 NBA playoffs. Games played totals against Chicago Stags include a tiebreaker game from the 1950 NBA playoffs. As these games were played only to determine playoff seeding, they are not considered to be a complete series and are not counted in the occurrences section or the total series win–loss records.)	80		392	40–40	.500

== Golden State Warriors ==
Opponent	S	Occurrences	GP	Rec	%
Philadelphia 76ers	10	1950, 1951, 1952, **1956**, 1957, **1958**, **1960**, 1961, **1962**, 1967	34	4–6	.400
Los Angeles Lakers	8	**1967**, 1968, 1969, 1973, 1977, 1987, 1991, 2023	41	1–7	.125
Boston Celtics	5	1958, 1960, 1962, 1964, **2022**	29	1–4	.200
Houston Rockets	5	**2015**, **2016**, **2018**, **2019**, **2025**	30	5–0	1.000
Utah Jazz	4	**1987**, **1989**, 2007, **2017**	17	3–1	.750
San Antonio Spurs	4	**1991**, 2013, **2017**, **2018**	19	3–1	.750
Cleveland Cavaliers	4	**2015**, 2016, **2017**, **2018**	22	3–1	.750
Detroit Pistons	3	**1956**, **1976**, **1977**	14	3–0	1.000
Atlanta Hawks	3	**1964**, **1967**, **1968**	19	3–0	1.000
Portland Trail Blazers	3	**2016**, **2017**, **2019**	13	3–0	1.000
Oklahoma City Thunder	3	**1975**, 1992, **2016**	17	2–1	.667
Milwaukee Bucks	3	1971, 1972, **1973**	16	1–2	.333
Phoenix Suns	3	1976, 1989, 1994	15	0–3	.000
St. Louis Bombers	2	**1947**, **1948**	10	2–0	1.000
New Orleans Pelicans	2	**2015**, **2018**	9	2–0	1.000
Denver Nuggets	2	**2013**, **2022**	11	2–0	1.000
Memphis Grizzlies	2	**2015**, **2022**	12	2–0	1.000
Dallas Mavericks	2	**2007**, **2022**	11	2–0	1.000
Los Angeles Clippers	2	2014, **2019**	13	1–1	.500
Chicago Stags	1	**1947**	5	1–0	1.000
New York Knicks	1	**1947**	2	1–0	1.000
Washington Wizards	1	**1975**	4	1–0	1.000
Chicago Bulls	1	**1975**	7	1–0	1.000
Sacramento Kings	1	**2023**	7	1–0	1.000
Baltimore Bullets (original)	1	1948	6	0–1	.000
Washington Capitols	1	1949	2	0–1	.000
Toronto Raptors	1	2019	6	0–1	.000
Minnesota Timberwolves	1	2025	5	0–1	.000
Totals	79		396	48–31	.608

== Houston Rockets ==
Opponent	S	Occurrences	GP	Rec	%
Los Angeles Lakers	10	**1981**, **1986**, 1990, 1991, **1996**, 1999, 2004, 2009, 2020, 2026	46	3–7	.300
Utah Jazz	9	1985, **1994**, **1995**, 1997, 1998, 2007, 2008, **2018**, **2019**	49	4–5	.444
Oklahoma City Thunder	9	1982, 1987, 1989, 1993, 1996, **1997**, 2013, **2017**, **2020**	49	3–6	.333
Golden State Warriors	5	2015, 2016, 2018, 2019, 2025	30	0–5	.000
San Antonio Spurs	4	**1980**, **1981**, **1995**, 2017	22	3–1	.750
Portland Trail Blazers	4	**1987**, **1994**, **2009**, 2014	20	3–1	.750
Boston Celtics	4	1975, 1980, 1981, 1986	21	0–4	.000
Dallas Mavericks	3	1988, 2005, **2015**	16	1–2	.333
New York Knicks	2	**1975**, **1994**	10	2–0	1.000
Sacramento Kings	2	**1981**, **1986**	8	2–0	1.000
Los Angeles Clippers	2	**1993**, **2015**	12	2–0	1.000
Phoenix Suns	2	**1994**, **1995**	14	2–0	1.000
Minnesota Timberwolves	2	**1997**, **2018**	8	2–0	1.000
Atlanta Hawks	2	1969, 1979	8	0–2	.000
Washington Wizards	1	**1977**	6	1–0	1.000
Denver Nuggets	1	**1986**	6	1–0	1.000
Orlando Magic	1	**1995**	4	1–0	1.000
Philadelphia 76ers	1	1977	6	0–1	.000
Totals	64		335	30–34	.469

== Indiana Pacers ==
Opponent	S	Occurrences	GP	Rec	%
New York Knicks	9	1993, 1994, **1995**, **1998**, 1999, **2000**, **2013**, **2024**, **2025**	54	6–3	.667
Boston Celtics	7	1991, 1992, 2003, **2004**, **2005**, 2019, 2024	33	2–5	.286
Atlanta Hawks	6	1987, **1994**, **1995**, 1996, **2013**, **2014**	31	4–2	.667
Miami Heat	5	**2004**, 2012, 2013, 2014, 2020	29	1–4	.200
Milwaukee Bucks	4	**1999**, **2000**, **2024**, **2025**	19	4–0	1.000
Philadelphia 76ers	4	1981, **1999**, **2000**, 2001	16	2–2	.500
Cleveland Cavaliers	4	**1998**, 2017, 2018, **2025**	20	2–2	.500
Orlando Magic	3	**1994**, 1995, **2012**	15	2–1	.667
Detroit Pistons	3	1990, 2004, 2005	15	0–3	.000
Chicago Bulls	2	1998, 2011	12	0–2	.000
Brooklyn Nets	2	2002, 2006	11	0–2	.000
Washington Wizards	1	**2014**	6	1–0	1.000
Los Angeles Lakers	1	2000	6	0–1	.000
Toronto Raptors	1	2016	7	0–1	.000
Oklahoma City Thunder	1	2025	7	0–1	.000
Totals	53		277	24–29	.453

== Los Angeles Clippers ==
Opponent	S	Occurrences	GP	Rec	%
Utah Jazz	4	1992, 1997, 2017, **2021**	21	1–3	.250
Phoenix Suns	3	2006, 2021, 2023	18	0–3	.000
Dallas Mavericks	3	**2020**, **2021**, 2024	19	2–1	.667
Denver Nuggets	3	**2006**, 2020, 2025	19	1–2	.333
Memphis Grizzlies	2	**2012**, 2013	13	1–1	.500
San Antonio Spurs	2	2012, **2015**	11	1–1	.500
Golden State Warriors	2	**2014**, 2019	13	1–1	.500
Boston Celtics	2	1974, 1976	12	0–2	.000
Houston Rockets	2	1993, 2015	12	0–2	.000
Philadelphia 76ers	1	**1976**	3	1–0	1.000
Washington Wizards	1	1975	7	0–1	.000
Oklahoma City Thunder	1	2014	6	0–1	.000
Portland Trail Blazers	1	2016	6	0–1	.000
Totals	27		156	8–19	.296

== Los Angeles Lakers ==
Opponent	S	Occurrences	GP	Rec	%
Phoenix Suns	13	**1970**, **1980**, **1982**, **1984**, **1985**, **1989**, 1990, 1993, **2000**, 2006, 2007, **2010**, 2021	68	8–5	.615
Portland Trail Blazers	12	1977, **1983**, **1985**, **1989**, **1991**, 1992, **1997**, **1998**, **2000**, **2001**, **2002**, **2020**	53	10–2	.833
San Antonio Spurs	12	**1982**, **1983**, **1986**, **1988**, 1995, 1999, **2001**, **2002**, 2003, **2004**, **2008**, 2013	56	8–4	.667
Boston Celtics	12	1959, 1962, 1963, 1965, 1966, 1968, 1969, 1984, **1985**, **1987**, 2008, **2010**	74	3–9	.250
Detroit Pistons	11	**1950**, **1953**, 1955, **1957**, **1959**, **1960**, **1961**, **1962**, **1988**, 1989, 2004	47	8–3	.727
Houston Rockets	10	1981, 1986, **1990**, **1991**, 1996, **1999**, **2004**, **2009**, **2020**, **2026**	46	7–3	.700
Oklahoma City Thunder	10	1978, 1979, **1980**, **1987**, **1989**, **1995**, **1998**, **2010**, 2012, 2026	45	6–4	.600
Atlanta Hawks	10	1956, 1957, **1959**, 1960, 1961, **1963**, 1964, **1966**, **1969**, **1970**	56	5–5	.500
Sacramento Kings	9	**1949**, 1951, **1952**, **1954**, **1955**, **1984**, **2000**, **2001**, **2002**	37	8–1	.889
Denver Nuggets	9	**1979**, **1985**, **1987**, **2008**, **2009**, **2012**, **2020**, 2023, 2024	42	7–2	.778
Golden State Warriors	8	1967, **1968**, **1969**, **1973**, **1977**, **1987**, **1991**, **2023**	41	7–1	.875
Philadelphia 76ers	6	**1950**, **1954**, **1980**, **1982**, 1983, **2001**	34	5–1	.833
Utah Jazz	6	**1988**, 1997, 1998, **2008**, **2009**, **2010**	31	4–2	.667
Chicago Bulls	5	**1968**, **1971**, **1972**, **1973**, 1991	28	4–1	.800
New York Knicks	5	**1952**, **1953**, 1970, **1972**, 1973	29	3–2	.600
Dallas Mavericks	4	**1984**, **1986**, **1988**, 2011	22	3–1	.750
Indianapolis Olympians	3	**1951**, **1952**, **1953**	7	3–0	1.000
Milwaukee Bucks	3	1971, **1972**, 1974	16	1–2	.333
Minnesota Timberwolves	3	**2003**, **2004**, 2025	17	2–1	.667
Chicago Stags	2	**1949**, **1950**	4	2–0	1.000
Washington Capitols	1	**1949**	6	1–0	1.000
Anderson Packers	1	**1950**	2	1–0	1.000
Washington Wizards	1	**1965**	6	1–0	1.000
Indiana Pacers	1	**2000**	6	1–0	1.000
Brooklyn Nets	1	**2002**	4	1–0	1.000
Orlando Magic	1	**2009**	5	1–0	1.000
New Orleans Pelicans	1	**2011**	6	1–0	1.000
Miami Heat	1	**2020**	6	1–0	1.000
Memphis Grizzlies	1	**2023**	6	1–0	1.000
Totals (Note: Games played totals against Fort Wayne (Detroit Pistons) and Rochester (Sacramento Kings) include two round-robin games from the 1954 NBA playoffs. Games played totals against Rochester (Sacramento Kings) include a tiebreaker game from the 1950 NBA playoffs. Games played totals against St. Louis (Atlanta Hawks) include a tiebreaker game from the 1956 and 1957 NBA playoffs. As these games were played only to determine playoff seeding, they are not considered to be a complete series and are not counted in the occurrences section or the total series win–loss records.)	162		785	113–49	.698

== Memphis Grizzlies ==
Opponent	S	Occurrences	GP	Rec	%
San Antonio Spurs	5	2004, **2011**, 2013, 2016, 2017	24	1–4	.200
Oklahoma City Thunder	4	2011, **2013**, 2014, 2025	23	1–3	.250
Los Angeles Clippers	2	2012, **2013**	13	1–1	.500
Golden State Warriors	2	2015, 2022	12	0–2	.000
Portland Trail Blazers	1	**2015**	5	1–0	1.000
Minnesota Timberwolves	1	**2022**	6	1–0	1.000
Phoenix Suns	1	2005	4	0–1	.000
Dallas Mavericks	1	2006	4	0–1	.000
Utah Jazz	1	2021	5	0–1	.000
Los Angeles Lakers	1	2023	6	0–1	.000
Totals	19		96	5–14	.263

== Miami Heat ==
Opponent	S	Occurrences	GP	Rec	%
Boston Celtics	7	2010, **2011**, **2012**, **2020**, 2022, **2023**, 2024	42	4–3	.571
Chicago Bulls	7	1992, 1996, 1997, **2006**, 2007, **2011**, **2013**	31	3–4	.429
New York Knicks	6	**1997**, 1998, 1999, 2000, **2012**, **2023**	35	3–3	.500
Indiana Pacers	5	2004, **2012**, **2013**, **2014**, **2020**	29	4–1	.800
Milwaukee Bucks	4	**2013**, **2020**, 2021, **2023**	18	3–1	.667
Brooklyn Nets	3	**2005**, **2006**, **2014**	14	3–0	1.000
Detroit Pistons	3	**2000**, 2005, **2006**	16	2–1	.667
Charlotte Hornets	3	2001, **2014**, **2016**	14	2–1	.667
Philadelphia 76ers	3	**2011**, 2018, **2022**	16	2–1	.667
Atlanta Hawks	3	1994, 2009, **2022**	17	1–2	.333
Dallas Mavericks	2	**2006**, 2011	12	1–1	.500
San Antonio Spurs	2	**2013**, 2014	12	1–1	.500
Orlando Magic	1	**1997**	5	1–0	1.000
New Orleans Pelicans	1	**2004**	7	1–0	1.000
Washington Wizards	1	**2005**	4	1–0	1.000
Oklahoma City Thunder	1	**2012**	5	1–0	1.000
Toronto Raptors	1	2016	7	0–1	.000
Los Angeles Lakers	1	2020	6	0–1	.000
Denver Nuggets	1	2023	5	0–1	.000
Cleveland Cavaliers	1	2025	4	0–1	.000
Totals	56		299	33–23	.589

== Milwaukee Bucks ==
Opponent	S	Occurrences	GP	Rec	%
Philadelphia 76ers	9	**1970**, 1981, 1982, 1983, 1985, **1986**, **1987**, 1991, 2001	49	3–6	.333
Boston Celtics	8	1974, **1983**, 1984, 1986, 1987, 2018, **2019**, 2022	46	2–6	.250
Chicago Bulls	5	**1974**, **1985**, 1990, 2015, **2022**	23	3–2	.600
Atlanta Hawks	5	**1984**, 1988, **1989**, 2010, **2021**	28	3–2	.500
Detroit Pistons	5	1976, 1989, 2004, 2006, **2019**	21	1–4	.200
Brooklyn Nets	4	**1984**, **1986**, 2003, **2021**	22	3–1	.750
Miami Heat	4	2013, 2020, **2021**, 2023	18	1–3	.333
Indiana Pacers	4	1999, 2000, 2024, 2025	19	0–4	.000
Golden State Warriors	3	**1971**, **1972**, 1973	16	2–1	.667
Los Angeles Lakers	3	**1971**, 1972, **1974**	16	2–1	.667
Orlando Magic	2	**2001**, **2020**	9	2–0	1.000
Phoenix Suns	2	**1978**, **2021**	8	2–0	1.000
Toronto Raptors	2	2017, 2019	12	0–2	.000
Washington Wizards	1	**1971**	4	1–0	1.000
Charlotte Hornets	1	**2001**	7	1–0	1.000
New York Knicks	1	1970	5	0–1	.000
Denver Nuggets	1	1978	7	0–1	.000
Oklahoma City Thunder	1	1980	7	0–1	.000
Totals	61		317	26–35	.426

== Minnesota Timberwolves ==
Opponent	S	Occurrences	GP	Rec	%
Denver Nuggets	4	**2004**, 2023, **2024**, **2026**	23	3–1	.750
Los Angeles Lakers	3	2003, 2004, **2025**	17	1–2	.333
San Antonio Spurs	3	1999, 2001, 2026	14	0–3	.000
Oklahoma City Thunder	2	1998, 2025	10	0–2	.000
Houston Rockets	2	1997, 2018	8	0–2	.000
Dallas Mavericks	2	2002, 2024	8	0–2	.000
Sacramento Kings	1	**2004**	7	1–0	1.000
Phoenix Suns	1	**2024**	4	1–0	1.000
Golden State Warriors	1	**2025**	5	1–0	1.000
Portland Trail Blazers	1	2000	4	0–1	.000
Memphis Grizzlies	1	2022	6	0–1	.000
Totals	21		106	7–14	.333

== New Orleans Pelicans ==
Opponent	S	Occurrences	GP	Rec	%
Golden State Warriors	2	2015, 2018	9	0–2	.000
Dallas Mavericks	1	**2008**	5	1–0	1.000
Portland Trail Blazers	1	**2018**	4	1–0	1.000
Oklahoma City Thunder	1	2024	4	0–1	.000
Philadelphia 76ers	1	2003	6	0–1	.000
Miami Heat	1	2004	7	0–1	.000
San Antonio Spurs	1	2008	7	0–1	.000
Denver Nuggets	1	2009	5	0–1	.000
Los Angeles Lakers	1	2011	6	0–1	.000
Phoenix Suns	1	2022	6	0–1	.000
Totals	11		59	2–9	.182

== New York Knicks ==
Opponent	S	Occurrences	GP	Rec	%
Boston Celtics	15	**1951**, **1952**, **1953**, 1955, 1967, 1969, **1972**, **1973**, 1974, 1984, 1988, **1990**, 2011, **2013**, **2025**	73	8–7	.533
Philadelphia 76ers	11	1950, **1951**, **1952**, 1956, 1959, 1968, 1978, 1983, **1989**, **2024**, **2026**	44	5–6	.455
Indiana Pacers	9	**1993**, **1994**, 1995, 1998, **1999**, 2000, 2013, 2024, 2025	54	3–6	.333
Chicago Bulls	7	1981, 1989, 1991, 1992, 1993, **1994**, 1996	36	1–6	.143
Washington Wizards	6	**1969**, **1970**, 1971, **1972**, **1973**, **1974**	36	5–1	.833
Miami Heat	6	1997, **1998**, **1999**, **2000**, 2012, 2023	35	3–3	.500
Cleveland Cavaliers	5	**1978**, **1995**, **1996**, **2023**, **2026**	18	5–0	1.000
Los Angeles Lakers	5	1952, 1953, **1970**, 1972, **1973**	29	2–3	.400
Detroit Pistons	4	**1984**, 1990, **1992**, **2025**	21	3–1	.750
Atlanta Hawks	4	**1971**, **1999**, 2021, **2026**	20	3–1	.667
Baltimore Bullets (original)	3	1948, **1949**, **1953**	8	2–1	.667
Brooklyn Nets	3	**1983**, **1994**, 2004	10	2–1	.667
Charlotte Hornets	2	**1993**, **1997**	8	2–0	1.000
Washington Capitols	2	1949, **1950**	5	1–1	.500
Toronto Raptors	2	**2000**, 2001	8	1–1	.500
San Antonio Spurs	2	1999, **2026**	10	1–1	.500
Houston Rockets	2	1975, 1994	10	0–2	.000
Cleveland Rebels	1	**1947**	3	1–0	1.000
Milwaukee Bucks	1	**1970**	5	1–0	1.000
Golden State Warriors	1	1947	2	0–1	.000
Sacramento Kings	1	1951	7	0–1	.000
Totals (Note: Games played totals against Boston and Syracuse (Philadelphia 76ers) include two round-robin games from the 1954 NBA playoffs. As these games were played only to determine playoff seeding, they are not considered to be a complete series and are not counted in the occurrences section or the total series win–loss records.)	92		442	49–43	.533

== Oklahoma City Thunder ==
Opponent	S	Occurrences	GP	Rec	%
Los Angeles Lakers	10	**1978**, **1979**, 1980, 1987, 1989, 1995, 1998, 2010, **2012**, **2026**	45	4–6	.400
Houston Rockets	9	**1982**, **1987**, **1989**, **1993**, **1996**, 1997, **2013**, 2017, 2020	49	6–3	.667
San Antonio Spurs	7	1982, 2002, 2005, **2012**, 2014, **2016**, 2026	41	2–5	.285
Dallas Mavericks	6	1984, **1987**, 2011, **2012**, **2016**, 2024	29	3–3	.500
Denver Nuggets	5	**1978**, 1988, 1994, **2011**, **2025**	28	3–2	.600
Phoenix Suns	5	1976, **1979**, 1993, **1997**, **2026**	29	3–2	.600
Portland Trail Blazers	5	**1978**, **1980**, 1983, 1991, 2019	21	2–3	.400
Utah Jazz	5	1992, **1993**, **1996**, 2000, 2018	28	2–3	.400
Memphis Grizzlies	4	**2011**, 2013, **2014**, **2025**	23	3–1	.750
Golden State Warriors	3	1975, **1992**, 2016	17	1–2	.333
Sacramento Kings	2	**1996**, **2005**	9	2–0	1.000
Minnesota Timberwolves	2	**1998**, **2025**	10	2–0	1.000
Washington Wizards	2	1978, **1979**	12	1–1	.500
Detroit Pistons	1	**1975**	3	1–0	1.000
Milwaukee Bucks	1	**1980**	7	1–0	1.000
Los Angeles Clippers	1	**2014**	6	1–0	1.000
New Orleans Pelicans	1	**2024**	4	1–0	1.000
Indiana Pacers	1	**2025**	7	1–0	1.000
Chicago Bulls	1	1996	6	0–1	.000
Miami Heat	1	2012	5	0–1	.000
Totals	71		372	38–33	.535

== Orlando Magic ==
Opponent	S	Occurrences	GP	Rec	%
Detroit Pistons	5	**1996**, 2003, 2007, 2008, 2026	26	1–4	.200
Boston Celtics	4	**1995**, **2009**, 2010, 2025	22	2–2	.500
Atlanta Hawks	3	**1996**, **2010**, 2011	15	2–1	.667
Indiana Pacers	3	1994, **1995**, 2012	15	1–2	.333
Chicago Bulls	2	**1995**, 1996	10	1–1	.500
Philadelphia 76ers	2	1999, **2009**	10	1–1	.500
Charlotte Hornets	2	2002, **2010**	8	1–1	.500
Toronto Raptors	2	**2008**, 2019	10	1–1	.500
Cleveland Cavaliers	2	**2009**, 2024	13	1–1	.500
Milwaukee Bucks	2	2001, 2020	9	0–2	.000
Houston Rockets	1	1995	4	0–1	.000
Miami Heat	1	1997	5	0–1	.000
Los Angeles Lakers	1	2009	5	0–1	.000
Totals	30		152	11–19	.367

== Philadelphia 76ers ==
Opponent	S	Occurrences	GP	Rec	%
Boston Celtics	23	1953, **1954**, **1955**, **1956**, 1957, 1959, 1961, 1965, 1966, **1967**, 1968, 1969, **1977**, **1980**, 1981, **1982**, 1985, 2002, 2012, 2018, 2020, 2023, **2026**	123	8–15	.348
New York Knicks	11	**1950**, 1951, 1952, **1956**, **1959**, **1968**, **1978**, **1983**, 1989, 2024, 2026	44	6–5	.545
Golden State Warriors	10	**1950**, **1951**, **1952**, 1956, **1957**, 1958, 1960, **1961**, 1962, **1967**	34	6–4	.600
Milwaukee Bucks	9	1970, **1981**, **1982**, **1983**, **1985**, 1986, 1987, **1991**, **2001**	49	6–3	.667
Washington Wizards	6	1971, 1978, **1980**, **1985**, **1986**, **2021**	29	4–2	.667
Los Angeles Lakers	6	1950, 1954, 1980, 1982, **1983**, 2001	34	1–5	.167
Sacramento Kings	4	1963, 1964, **1965**, **1967**	18	2–2	.500
Indiana Pacers	4	**1981**, 1999, 2000, **2001**	16	2–2	.500
Detroit Pistons	4	**1955**, 2003, 2005, 2008	24	1–3	.250
Brooklyn Nets	4	**1979**, 1984, **2019**, **2023**	16	3–1	.750
Atlanta Hawks	3	**1980**, **1982**, 2021	14	2–1	.667
Toronto Raptors	3	**2001**, 2019, **2022**	20	2–1	.667
Chicago Bulls	3	1990, 1991, **2012**	16	1–2	.333
Miami Heat	3	2011, **2018**, 2022	16	1–2	.333
Orlando Magic	2	**1999**, 2009	10	1–1	.500
Houston Rockets	1	**1977**	6	1–0	1.000
Cleveland Cavaliers	1	**1990**	5	1–0	1.000
Charlotte Hornets	1	**2000**	4	1–0	1.000
New Orleans Pelicans	1	**2003**	6	1–0	1.000
Los Angeles Clippers	1	1976	3	0–1	.000
Portland Trail Blazers	1	1977	6	0–1	.000
San Antonio Spurs	1	1979	7	0–1	.000
Totals (Note: Games played totals against Boston and New York include two round-robin games from the 1954 NBA playoffs. As these games were played only to determine playoff seeding, they are not considered to be a complete series and are not counted in the occurrences section or the total series win–loss records.)	102		494	50–52	.490

== Phoenix Suns ==
Opponent	S	Occurrences	GP	Rec	%
Los Angeles Lakers	13	1970, 1980, 1982, 1984, 1985, 1989, **1990**, **1993**, 2000, **2006**, **2007**, 2010, **2021**	68	5–8	.385
San Antonio Spurs	10	**1992**, **1993**, 1996, 1998, **2000**, 2003, 2005, 2007, 2008, **2010**	47	4–6	.400
Portland Trail Blazers	7	**1979**, **1984**, 1990, 1992, **1995**, 1999, **2010**	31	4–3	.571
Denver Nuggets	5	**1982**, 1983, **1989**, **2021**, 2023	19	3–2	.600
Oklahoma City Thunder	5	**1976**, 1979, **1993**, 1997, 2026	29	2–3	.400
Sacramento Kings	4	**1979**, **1980**, 1981, 2001	19	2–2	.500
Golden State Warriors	3	**1976**, **1989**, **1994**	15	3–0	1.000
Los Angeles Clippers	3	**2006**, **2021**, **2023**	18	3–0	1.000
Utah Jazz	3	**1984**, **1990**, 1991	15	2–1	.667
Dallas Mavericks	3	**2005**, 2006, 2022	19	1–2	.333
Houston Rockets	2	1994, 1995	14	0–2	.000
Milwaukee Bucks	2	1978, 2021	8	0–2	.000
Memphis Grizzlies	1	**2005**	4	1–0	1.000
New Orleans Pelicans	1	**2022**	6	1–0	1.000
Boston Celtics	1	1976	6	0–1	.000
Chicago Bulls	1	1993	6	0–1	.000
Minnesota Timberwolves	1	2024	4	0–1	.000
Totals	65		317	31–34	.477

== Portland Trail Blazers ==
Opponent	S	Occurrences	GP	Rec	%
Los Angeles Lakers	12	**1977**, 1983, 1985, 1989, 1991, **1992**, 1997, 1998, 2000, 2001, 2002, 2020	53	2–10	.167
Phoenix Suns	7	1979, 1984, **1990**, **1992**, 1995, **1999**, 2010	31	3–4	.429
Utah Jazz	6	1988, **1991**, **1992**, 1996, **1999**, **2000**	31	4–2	.667
Oklahoma City Thunder	5	1978, 1980, **1983**, **1991**, **2019**	21	3–2	.600
San Antonio Spurs	5	**1990**, 1993, 1999, 2014, 2026	25	1–4	.200
Denver Nuggets	4	**1977**, 1986, **2019**, 2021	23	2–2	.667
Dallas Mavericks	4	**1985**, **1990**, 2003, 2011	20	2–2	.500
Houston Rockets	4	1987, 1994, 2009, **2014**	20	1–3	.250
Golden State Warriors	3	2016, 2017, 2019	13	0–3	.000
Chicago Bulls	2	**1977**, 1992	9	1–1	.500
Philadelphia 76ers	1	**1977**	6	1–0	1.000
Minnesota Timberwolves	1	**2000**	4	1–0	1.000
Los Angeles Clippers	1	**2016**	6	1–0	1.000
Sacramento Kings	1	1981	3	0–1	.000
Detroit Pistons	1	1990	5	0–1	.000
Memphis Grizzlies	1	2015	5	0–1	.000
New Orleans Pelicans	1	2018	4	0–1	.000
Totals	59		280	22–37	.373

== Sacramento Kings ==
Opponent	S	Occurrences	GP	Rec	%
Los Angeles Lakers	9	1949, **1951**, 1952, 1954, 1955, 1984, 2000, 2001, 2002	37	1–8	.111
Detroit Pistons	6	1950, **1951**, **1952**, 1953, 1958, 1962	18	2–4	.333
Philadelphia 76ers	4	**1963**, **1964**, 1965, 1967	18	2–2	.500
Phoenix Suns	4	1979, 1980, **1981**, **2001**	19	2–2	.500
Utah Jazz	3	1999, **2002**, **2003**	14	2–1	.667
Dallas Mavericks	3	**2002**, 2003, **2004**	17	2–1	.667
Boston Celtics	3	1963, 1964, 1966	17	0–3	.000
Houston Rockets	2	1981, 1986	8	0–2	.000
Oklahoma City Thunder	2	1996, 2005	9	0–2	.000
St. Louis Bombers	1	**1949**	2	1–0	1.000
New York Knicks	1	**1951**	7	1–0	1.000
Portland Trail Blazers	1	**1981**	3	1–0	1.000
Chicago Bulls	1	1975	6	0–1	.000
Minnesota Timberwolves	1	2004	7	0–1	.000
San Antonio Spurs	1	2006	6	0–1	.000
Golden State Warriors	1	2023	7	0–1	.000
Totals (Note: Games played totals against Fort Wayne (Detroit Pistons) and Minneapolis (Los Angeles Lakers) include two round-robin games from the 1954 NBA playoffs. Games played totals against Minneapolis (Los Angeles Lakers) include a tiebreaker game from the 1950 NBA playoffs. As these games were played only to determine playoff seeding, they are not considered to be a complete series and are not counted in the occurrences section or the total series win–loss records.)	43		195	14–29	.326

== San Antonio Spurs ==
Opponent	S	Occurrences	GP	Rec	%
Los Angeles Lakers	12	1982, 1983, 1986, 1988, **1995**, **1999**, 2001, 2002, **2003**, 2004, 2008, **2013**	56	4–8	.333
Phoenix Suns	10	1992, 1993, **1996**, **1998**, 2000, **2003**, **2005**, **2007**, **2008**, 2010	47	6–4	.600
Denver Nuggets	7	**1983**, 1985, **1990**, **1995**, **2005**, **2007**, 2019	33	5–2	.714
Oklahoma City Thunder	7	**1982**, **2002**, **2005**, 2012, **2014**, 2016, **2026**	41	5–2	.714
Dallas Mavericks	6	**2001**, **2003**, 2006, 2009, **2010**, **2014**	36	4–2	.667
Memphis Grizzlies	5	**2004**, 2011, **2013**, **2016**, **2017**	24	4–1	.800
Portland Trail Blazers	5	1990, **1993**, **1999**, **2014**, **2026**	25	4–1	.800
Utah Jazz	5	1994, 1996, 1998, **2007**, **2012**	24	2–3	.400
Houston Rockets	4	1980, 1981, 1995, **2017**	22	1–3	.250
Golden State Warriors	4	1991, **2013**, 2017, 2018	19	1–3	.250
Minnesota Timberwolves	3	**1999**, **2001**, **2026**	14	3–0	1.000
Los Angeles Clippers	2	**2012**, 2015	11	1–1	.500
Miami Heat	2	2013, **2014**	12	1–1	.500
Washington Wizards	2	1978, 1979	13	0–2	.000
New York Knicks	2	**1999**, 2026	10	1–1	.500
Philadelphia 76ers	1	**1979**	7	1–0	1.000
Brooklyn Nets	1	**2003**	6	1–0	1.000
Detroit Pistons	1	**2005**	7	1–0	1.000
Sacramento Kings	1	**2006**	6	1–0	1.000
Cleveland Cavaliers	1	**2007**	4	1–0	1.000
New Orleans Pelicans	1	**2008**	7	1–0	1.000
Boston Celtics	1	1977	2	0–1	.000
Totals	83		427	48–35	.578

== Toronto Raptors ==
Opponent	S	Occurrences	GP	Rec	%
Cleveland Cavaliers	4	2016, 2017, 2018, 2026	21	0–4	.000
Philadelphia 76ers	3	2001, **2019**, 2022	20	1–2	.333
Brooklyn Nets	3	2007, 2014, **2020**	17	1–2	.333
Milwaukee Bucks	2	**2017**, **2019**	12	2–0	1.000
New York Knicks	2	2000, **2001**	8	1–1	.500
Orlando Magic	2	2008, **2019**	10	1–1	.500
Washington Wizards	2	2015, **2018**	10	1–1	.500
Indiana Pacers	1	**2016**	7	1–0	1.000
Miami Heat	1	**2016**	7	1–0	1.000
Golden State Warriors	1	**2019**	6	1–0	1.000
Detroit Pistons	1	2002	5	0–1	.000
Boston Celtics	1	2020	7	0–1	.000
Totals	23		130	10–13	.435

== Utah Jazz ==
Opponent	S	Occurrences	GP	Rec	%
Houston Rockets	9	**1985**, 1994, 1995, **1997**, **1998**, **2007**, **2008**, 2018, 2019	49	5–4	.556
Portland Trail Blazers	6	**1988**, 1991, 1992, **1996**, 1999, 2000	31	2–4	.333
Los Angeles Lakers	6	1988, **1997**, **1998**, 2008, 2009, 2010	31	2–4	.333
Denver Nuggets	5	**1984**, 1985, **1994**, **2010**, 2020	30	3–2	.600
Oklahoma City Thunder	5	**1992**, 1993, 1996, **2000**, **2018**	28	3–2	.600
San Antonio Spurs	5	**1994**, **1996**, **1998**, 2007, 2012	24	3–2	.600
Los Angeles Clippers	4	**1992**, **1997**, **2017**, 2021	21	3–1	.750
Golden State Warriors	4	1987, 1989, **2007**, 2017	17	1–3	.250
Phoenix Suns	3	1984, 1990, **1991**	15	1–2	.333
Sacramento Kings	3	**1999**, 2002, 2003	14	1–2	.333
Dallas Mavericks	3	1986, 2001, 2022	15	0–3	.000
Chicago Bulls	2	1997, 1998	12	0–2	.000
Memphis Grizzlies	1	**2021**	5	1–0	1.000
Totals	56		292	25–31	.446

== Washington Wizards ==
Opponent	S	Occurrences	GP	Rec	%
Atlanta Hawks	6	**1965**, 1966, **1978**, **1979**, 2015, **2017**	28	4–2	.667
Philadelphia 76ers	6	**1971**, **1978**, 1980, 1985, 1986, 2021	29	2–4	.333
New York Knicks	6	1969, 1970, **1971**, 1972, 1973, 1974	36	1–5	.167
Cleveland Cavaliers	5	1976, **1977**, 2006, 2007, 2008	26	1–4	.200
Boston Celtics	4	**1975**, 1982, 1984, 2017	22	1–3	.250
Chicago Bulls	3	1997, **2005**, **2014**	14	2–1	.667
San Antonio Spurs	2	**1978**, **1979**	13	2–0	1.000
Oklahoma City Thunder	2	**1978**, 1979	12	1–1	.500
Toronto Raptors	2	**2015**, 2018	10	1–1	.500
Detroit Pistons	2	1987, 1988	8	0–2	.000
Los Angeles Clippers	1	**1975**	7	1–0	1.000
Brooklyn Nets	1	**1982**	2	1–0	1.000
Los Angeles Lakers	1	1965	6	0–1	.000
Milwaukee Bucks	1	1971	4	0–1	.000
Golden State Warriors	1	1975	4	0–1	.000
Houston Rockets	1	1977	6	0–1	.000
Miami Heat	1	2005	4	0–1	.000
Indiana Pacers	1	2014	6	0–1	.000
Totals	46		239	17–29	.370

== Defunct teams ==
=== Anderson Packers ===
Opponent	S	Occurrences	GP	Rec	%
Atlanta Hawks	1	**1950**	3	1–0	1.000
Indianapolis Olympians	1	**1950**	3	1–0	1.000
Los Angeles Lakers	1	1950	2	0–1	.000
Totals	3		8	2–1	.667

=== Baltimore Bullets (original) ===
Opponent	S	Occurrences	GP	Rec	%
New York Knicks	3	**1948**, 1949, 1953	8	1–2	.333
Chicago Stags	1	**1948**	3	1–0	1.000
Golden State Warriors	1	**1948**	6	1–0	1.000
Totals (Note: Games played totals against Chicago Stags include a tiebreaker game from the 1948 BAA playoffs. As these games were played only to determine playoff seeding, they are not considered to be a complete series and are not counted in the occurrences section or the total series win–loss records.)	5		17	3–2	.600

=== Chicago Stags ===
Opponent	S	Occurrences	GP	Rec	%
Los Angeles Lakers	2	1949, 1950	4	0–2	.000
Washington Capitols	2	**1947**, **1948**	7	2–0	1.000
Boston Celtics	1	**1948**	3	1–0	1.000
Golden State Warriors	1	1947	5	0–1	.000
Baltimore Bullets (original)	1	1948	3	0–1	.000
Detroit Pistons	0		1	0–0	.000
Totals (Note: Games played totals against Baltimore (original) include a tiebreaker game from the 1948 BAA playoffs. Games played totals against Fort Wayne (Detroit Pistons) include a tiebreaker game from the 1950 NBA playoffs. As these games were played only to determine playoff seeding, they are not considered to be a complete series and are not counted in the occurrences section or the total series win–loss records.)	7		23	3–4	.429

=== Cleveland Rebels ===
Opponent	S	Occurrences	GP	Rec	%
New York Knicks	1	1947	3	0–1	.000
Totals	1		3	0–1	.000

=== Indianapolis Olympians ===
Opponent	S	Occurrences	GP	Rec	%
Los Angeles Lakers	3	1951, 1952, 1953	7	0–3	.000
Sheboygan Red Skins	1	**1950**	3	1–0	1.000
Anderson Packers	1	1950	3	0–1	.000
Totals	5		13	1–4	.200

=== Sheboygan Red Skins ===
Opponent	S	Occurrences	GP	Rec	%
Indianapolis Olympians	1	1950	3	0–1	.000
Totals	1		3	0–1	.000

=== St. Louis Bombers ===
Opponent	S	Occurrences	GP	Rec	%
Golden State Warriors	2	1947, 1948	10	0–2	.000
Sacramento Kings	1	1949	2	0–1	.000
Totals	3		12	0–3	.000

=== Washington Capitols ===
Opponent	S	Occurrences	GP	Rec	%
Chicago Stags	2	1947, 1948	7	0–2	.000
New York Knicks	2	**1949**, 1950	5	1–1	.500
Golden State Warriors	1	**1949**	2	1–0	1.000
Los Angeles Lakers	1	1949	6	0–1	.000
Totals	6		20	2–4	.333

== Most frequent series ==
Rank	Total	Team	Record	Team	First occurrence	Last occurrence	Franchise variants
1	23 (Note: Including the round-robin games from the 1954 NBA playoffs, both teams would have met 24 times.)	Boston Celtics	15–8	Philadelphia 76ers	1953	2026	Boston (4–3) Syracuse; Boston (11–5) Philadelphia
2	15 (Note: Including the round-robin games from the 1954 NBA playoffs, both teams would have met 16 times.)	New York Knicks	8–7	Boston Celtics	1951	2025	
3	13	Boston Celtics	11–2	Atlanta Hawks	1957	2023	Boston (3–1) St. Louis; Boston (7–1) Atlanta
3	13	Los Angeles Lakers	8–5	Phoenix Suns	1970	2021	
5	12	Los Angeles Lakers	10–2	Portland Trail Blazers	1977	2020	
5	12 (Note: Most frequent matchup in NBA Finals.)	Boston Celtics	9–3	Los Angeles Lakers	1959	2010	Boston (1–0) Minneapolis; Boston (8–3) Los Angeles
5	12 (Note: Including the round-robin games from the 1954 NBA playoffs, both teams would have met 13 times.)	Los Angeles Lakers	9–3	Detroit Pistons	1950	2004	Minneapolis (4–1) Fort Wayne; Minneapolis (2–0) Detroit; Los Angeles (3–2) Detroit
5	12	Los Angeles Lakers	8–4	San Antonio Spurs	1982	2013	
9	11 (Note: Including the round-robin games from the 1954 NBA playoffs, both teams would have met 11 times.)	Philadelphia 76ers	6–5	New York Knicks	1950	2026	Syracuse (3–2) New York; Philadelphia (3–3) New York
10	10	Los Angeles Lakers	7–3	Houston Rockets	1981	2026	
10	10	Philadelphia 76ers	6–4	Golden State Warriors	1950	1967	Syracuse (5–4) Phil. Warriors; Phil. 76ers (1–0) San Francisco
10	10	San Antonio Spurs	6–4	Phoenix Suns	1992	2010	
10	10	Los Angeles Lakers	6–4	Oklahoma City Thunder	1978	2026	Los Angeles (5–2) Seattle; Oklahoma City (2–1) Los Angeles
10	10	Los Angeles Lakers	5–5	Atlanta Hawks	1956	1970	St. Louis (3–1) Minneapolis; St. Louis (2–2) Los Angeles; Los Angeles (2–0) Atlanta
15	9 (Note: Including the round-robin games from the 1954 NBA playoffs, both teams would have met 10 times.)	Los Angeles Lakers	8–1	Sacramento Kings	1949	2002	Minneapolis (4–1) Rochester; Los Angeles (1–0) Kansas City; Los Angeles (3–0) Sacramento
15	9	Los Angeles Lakers	7–2	Denver Nuggets	1979	2024	
15	9	Atlanta Hawks	6–3	Detroit Pistons	1956	1999	St. Louis (1–1) Fort Wayne; St. Louis (2–0) Detroit; Atlanta (3–2) Detroit
15	9	Philadelphia 76ers	6–3	Milwaukee Bucks	1970	2001	
15	9	Oklahoma City Thunder	6–3	Houston Rockets	1982	2020	Seattle (5–1) Houston; Houston (2–1) Oklahoma City
15	9	Indiana Pacers	6–3	New York Knicks	1993	2025	
15	9	Boston Celtics	5–4	Cleveland Cavaliers	1976	2024	
15	9	Utah Jazz	5–4	Houston Rockets	1985	2019	

== See also ==
- List of MLB postseason series
- List of NFL playoff games
- List of NHL playoff series
- List of WNBA playoff series
