= Rams–Vikings rivalry =

National Football League rivalry

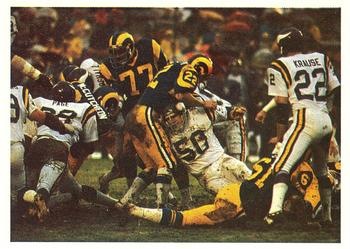
- The Rams and Vikings meeting in the 1977 divisional playoffs

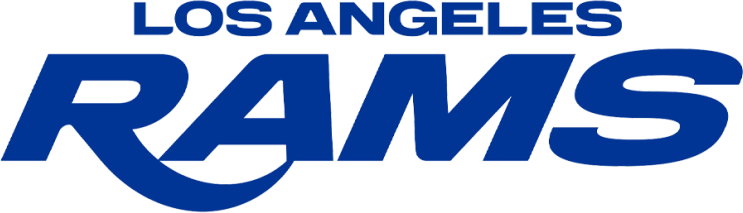
- Los Angeles Rams Minnesota Vikings
- Location: Los Angeles, Minneapolis
- First meeting: November 5, 1961; Rams 31, Vikings 17
- Latest meeting: January 13, 2025; Rams 27, Vikings 9
- Next meeting: 2027
- Stadiums: Rams: SoFi Stadium; Vikings: U.S. Bank Stadium

Statistics
- Total meetings: 49
- All-time series: Vikings: 27–20–2
- Regular season series: Vikings: 22–17–2
- Postseason results: Vikings: 5–3
- Largest victory: Rams: 39–3 (1967); Vikings: 35–7 (1966), 38–10 (2009), 34–6 (2014)
- Most points scored: Rams: 49 (1999); Vikings: 45 (1972)
- Longest win streak: Rams: 4 (1978–1985, 2018–present); Vikings: 6 (1987–1998)
- Current win streak: Rams: 4 (2018–present)

Post–season history
- 1969 NFL Western Championship: Vikings won: 23–20; 1974 NFC Championship: Vikings won: 14–10; 1976 NFC Championship: Vikings won: 24–13; 1977 NFC Divisional: Vikings won: 14–7; 1978 NFC Divisional: Rams won: 34–10; 1988 NFC Wild Card: Vikings won: 28–17; 1999 NFC Divisional: Rams won: 49–37; 2024 NFC Wild Card: Rams won: 27–9

The Rams–Vikings rivalry is a National Football League (NFL) rivalry between the Los Angeles Rams and Minnesota Vikings.

The rivalry was most heated in the 1970s when the Vikings and Rams faced off in many consequential playoff games. To date, with eight games, the Vikings are the Rams' second-most-played playoff opponent and the Rams are the most played playoff opponent for the Vikings.

The Vikings lead the overall series, 27–20–1. The two teams have met eight times in the playoffs, with the Vikings holding a 5–3 lead.

== Notable moments and games ==
- The 1972 game was the highest-scoring game of the year for both of those teams, as Fran Tarkenton of the Vikings threw for 319 yards and four touchdowns. For his part, Roman Gabriel of the Rams would complete 25 passes in the game, which at that time was his second-highest career total ever in that category.
- Playing inside a mud-soaked Los Angeles Coliseum in the divisional round of the '77 playoffs, the Vikings jumped out to a 14–0 lead before holding on for a 14–7 victory. Despite the mud, both teams found considerable traction in their running games. Rams running back Lawrence McCutcheon and Vikings running back Chuck Foreman each rushing for over 100 yards.
- In 1985, it was a defensive battle, as all of the first half scoring came on two Rams field goals to give them a 6–0 lead. Eric Dickerson then scored a touchdown in the third quarter to make it 13–0. The Vikings mounted a bit of a comeback, scoring on a Ted Brown touchdown run and a Jan Stenerud field goal, but it wasn't quite enough as the Rams held on to win 13–10.
- In 2015, the Vikings defeated the Rams 21–18 in overtime following an illegal hit to Minnesota quarterback Teddy Bridgewater by Rams' cornerback Lamarcus Joyner. Mike Zimmer famously declined receiving the ball in overtime after winning the toss due to favorable wind conditions for a possible game-winning kick. The Vikings ended up stopping the Rams, getting the ball, and kicking a game winning field goal.

== Connections between the two teams ==
Shortly after the Rams won Super Bowl LVI, the Vikings hired Rams offensive coordinator Kevin O'Connell as their new head coach following the firing of Zimmer at the end of the season. O'Connell brought several assistants from the Rams to work with him in Minnesota, with the most notable one being current Vikings offensive coordinator and former Rams tight end coach Wes Phillips.

== Season-by-season results ==
Los Angeles/St. Louis Rams vs. Minnesota Vikings Season-by-Season Results
1960s (Vikings, 9–6–1)

Season	Season series	at Los Angeles Rams	at Minnesota Vikings	Overall series	Notes
1961	Tie 1–1	Rams; 31–17	Vikings; 42–21	Tie; 1–1	Vikings join the National Football League (NFL) as an expansion team and are placed in the Western Conference.
1962	Vikings 1–0–1	Vikings; 38–14	Tie; 24–24	Vikings; 2–1–1	Game in Los Angeles is the Vikings' first road win in franchise history. It would also be their only road win in the 1962 season. Vikings record their first tie result.
1963	Tie 1–1	Rams; 27–24	Vikings; 21–13	Vikings; 3–2–1	Rams ended an 11-game home losing streak with their win.
1964	Tie 1–1	Rams; 22–13	Vikings; 34–13	Vikings; 4–3–1	
1965	Vikings 2–0	Vikings; 38–35	Vikings; 24–13	Vikings; 6–3–1	
1966	Tie 1–1	Rams; 21–6	Vikings; 35–7	Vikings; 7–4–1	
1967	Rams 1–0	Rams; 39–3	—N/a	Vikings; 7–5–1	As a result of expansion, the two eight-team divisions became two eight-team conferences split into two divisions, with the Rams placed in the NFL Coastal and the Vikings placed in the NFC Central.
1968	Rams 1–0	—N/a	Rams; 31–3	Vikings; 7–6–1	After their home loss to the Rams, the Vikings went on a 16-game home winning streak.
1969	Vikings 1–0	Vikings; 20–13	—N/a	Vikings; 8–6–1	Vikings’ win handed the Rams their first loss of the season after an 11–0 start. Rams lost their final three regular-season games, setting up a playoff matchup at Minnesota against the Vikings.
1969 Playoffs	Vikings 1–0	—N/a	Vikings 23–20	Vikings 9–6–1	NFL Western Conference Championship Game. Vikings lose Super Bowl IV.

1970s (Vikings, 6–5–1)

Season	Results	Location	Overall series	Notes
1970	Vikings; 13–3	Metropolitan Stadium	Vikings; 10–6–1	As a result of the AFL–NFL merger, the Rams were placed in the NFC West and the Vikings were placed in the NFC North.
1972	Vikings; 45–41	Los Angeles Memorial Coliseum	Vikings; 11–6–1	
1973	Vikings; 10–9	Metropolitan Stadium	Vikings; 12–6–1	Vikings lose Super Bowl VIII.
1974	Rams; 20–17	Los Angeles Memorial Coliseum	Vikings; 12–7–1	Rams' win is the Vikings only regular season road loss in the 1974 season.
1974 Playoffs	Vikings 14–10	Metropolitan Stadium	Vikings 13–7–1	NFC Championship Game. Vikings lose Super Bowl IX.
1976	Tie; 10–10	Metropolitan Stadium	Vikings; 13–7–2	
1976 Playoffs	Vikings 24–13	Metropolitan Stadium	Vikings 14–7–2	NFC Championship Game. Vikings lose Super Bowl XI.
1977	Rams; 35–3	Los Angeles Memorial Coliseum	Vikings; 14–8–2	
1977 Playoffs	Vikings 14–7	Los Angeles Memorial Coliseum	Vikings 15–8–2	NFC Divisional Round.
1978	Rams; 34–17	Metropolitan Stadium	Vikings; 15–9–2	Final meeting at Metropolitan Stadium.
1978 Playoffs	Rams 34–10	Los Angeles Memorial Coliseum	Vikings 15–10–2	NFC Divisional Round.
1979	Rams; 27–21(OT)	Los Angeles Memorial Coliseum	Vikings; 15–11–2	Final meeting at the Los Angeles Memorial Coliseum until the 2018 season, as the Rams move to Anaheim Stadium the following season. Rams lose Super Bowl XIV.

1980s (Vikings, 3–1)

Season	Results	Location	Overall series	Notes
1985	Rams; 13–10	Anaheim Stadium	Vikings; 15–12–2	First meeting at Anaheim Stadium.
1987	Vikings; 21–16	Anaheim Stadium	Vikings; 16–12–2	
1988 Playoffs	Vikings 28–17	Metrodome	Vikings 17–12–2	NFC Wild Card Game. First meeting at the Metrodome.
1989	Vikings; 23–21(OT)	Metrodome	Vikings; 18–12–2	First game in NFL history to be decided in overtime on a safety.

1990s (Vikings, 3–1)

Season	Results	Location	Overall series	Notes
1991	Vikings; 20–14	Metrodome	Vikings; 19–12–2	
1992	Vikings; 31–17	Anaheim Stadium	Vikings; 20–12–2	Final meeting at Anaheim Stadium. Last season until the 2016 season the Vikings faced the Rams as a Los Angeles-based team, as the Rams would relocate to St. Louis in the 1995 season.
1998	Vikings; 38–31	Trans World Dome	Vikings; 21–12–2	First meeting at Trans World Dome and in St. Louis.
1999 Playoffs	Rams 49–37	Trans World Dome	Vikings 21–13–2	NFC Divisional Round. Rams win Super Bowl XXXIV.

2000s (Rams, 3–2)

Season	Results	Location	Overall series	Notes
2000	Rams; 40–29	Trans World Dome	Vikings; 21–14–2	Starting with the loss to the Rams, the Vikings went on a 17-game road losing streak.
2003	Rams; 48–17	Edward Jones Dome	Vikings; 21–15–2	
2005	Vikings; 27–13	Metrodome	Vikings; 22–15–2	
2006	Rams; 41–21	Metrodome	Vikings; 22–16–2	Final meeting at the Metrodome.
2009	Vikings; 38–10	Edward Jones Dome	Vikings; 23–16–2	

2010s (Vikings, 4–1)

Season	Results	Location	Overall series	Notes
2012	Vikings; 36–22	Edward Jones Dome	Vikings; 24–16–2	
2014	Vikings; 34–6	Edward Jones Dome	Vikings; 25–16–2	Final meeting at Edward Jones Dome.
2015	Vikings; 21–18(OT)	TCF Bank Stadium	Vikings; 26–16–2	First meeting at TCF Bank Stadium. Last season Vikings faced the Rams as a St. Louis-based team, as the Rams would relocate back to Los Angeles the following season.
2017	Vikings; 24–7	U.S. Bank Stadium	Vikings; 27–16–2	First meeting at US Bank Stadium.
2018	Rams; 38–31	Los Angeles Memorial Coliseum	Vikings; 27–17–2	Rams temporarily play at Los Angeles Memorial Coliseum while SoFi Stadium is under construction.

2020s (Rams, 3–0)

Season	Results	Location	Overall series	Notes
2021	Rams; 30–23	U.S. Bank Stadium	Vikings; 27–18–2	Rams win Super Bowl LVI. Following the season's end, the Vikings hired Rams offensive coordinator Kevin O'Connell to serve as their next head coach.
2024	Rams; 30–20	SoFi Stadium	Vikings; 27–19–2	First meeting at SoFi Stadium.
2024 Playoffs	Rams 27–9	State Farm Stadium	Vikings 27–20–2	NFC Wild Card Round. Due to wildfires in southern California, the Rams' home game was moved to State Farm Stadium in Glendale, Arizona.

Summary of results

Season	Season series	at Los Angeles/St. Louis Rams	at Minnesota Vikings	Notes
Regular season	Vikings 22–17–2	Rams 13–10	Vikings 12–4–2	
Postseason	Vikings 5–3	Rams 3–1	Vikings 4–0	NFL Western Championship: 1969; NFC Wild Card: 1988, 2024; NFC Divisional: 1977, 1978, 1999; NFC Championship: 1974, 1976
Regular and postseason	Vikings 27–20–2	Rams 16–11	Vikings 16–4–2	Vikings have a 4–3 record in St. Louis. Rams currently have a 12–7 record in Los Angeles. Rams are 1–0 at State Farm Stadium in Glendale, Arizona, officially a Rams home game.
