= 49ers–Giants rivalry =

National Football League rivalry

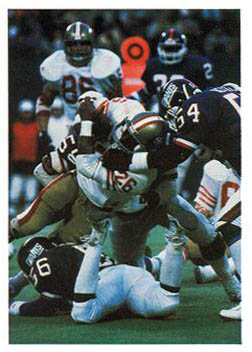
- The Giants and 49ers playing in the 1985 Wild Card

- San Francisco 49ers New York Giants
- Location: San Francisco, New York City
- First meeting: November 9, 1952; Giants 23, 49ers 14
- Latest meeting: November 2, 2025; 49ers 34, Giants 24
- Next meeting: December 6, 2026
- Stadiums: 49ers: Levi's Stadium; Giants: MetLife Stadium

Statistics
- Total meetings: 44
- All-time series: 49ers: 23–21
- Regular season series: 49ers: 19–17
- Postseason results: Tied: 4–4
- Largest victory: 49ers: 44–3 (1993); Giants: 49–3 (1986)
- Most points scored: 49ers: 44 (1993); Giants: 49 (1986)
- Longest win streak: 49ers: 6 (1992–2002); Giants: 5 (1972–1979)
- Current win streak: 49ers: 3 (2020–present)

Post–season history
- 1981 NFC Divisional: 49ers won: 38–24; 1984 NFC Divisional: 49ers won: 21–10; 1985 NFC Wild Card: Giants won: 17–3; 1986 NFC Divisional: Giants won: 49–3; 1990 NFC Championship: Giants won: 15–13; 1993 NFC Divisional: 49ers won: 44–3; 2002 NFC Wild Card: 49ers won: 39–38; 2011 NFC Championship: Giants won: 20–17 (OT)

The 49ers–Giants rivalry is a National Football League (NFL) rivalry between the San Francisco 49ers and New York Giants.

It is one of the great inter-division rivalry games in the National Football League (NFL). The two teams do not play each other every year; instead, they play at least once every three years and at least once every six seasons at each team's home stadium, sometimes more often if the two teams finish in the same place in their respective divisions or meet in the playoffs. Since 1982, the 49ers and Giants have met eight times in the postseason (including two NFC Championship Games), the second-most times two teams have met in the playoffs in the NFL since that time (behind 49ers–Packers). CBS Sports ranked this rivalry as the No. 1 NFL rivalry of the 1980s.

The 49ers lead the overall series, 23–21 The two teams have met eight times in the playoffs, with each team winning four games.

== Memorable games ==
=== 1981 Divisional Playoff Game ===
In what was the third season for both Bill Walsh and Joe Montana with the San Francisco 49ers, the team finished 13–3 after starting the season 1–2. They clinched the NFC West in a Week 13 matchup against the New York Giants and went on to secure the #1 seed in the NFC. Four weeks later, the Giants and 49ers met again in the Divisional Round, where San Francisco prevailed with a 38–24 victory en route to winning Super Bowl XVI.

=== 1984 Divisional Playoff Game ===
The 49ers finished the 1984 season with a record of 15–1. They hosted the Giants at Candlestick Park, where they beat a young and emerging Big Blue Wrecking Crew defense 21–10, en route to their second Lombardi Trophy in Super Bowl XIX.

=== 1985 Wild Card Playoff Game ===
Entering the 1985 playoffs, the 49ers finished with a 10–6 record and secured a Wild Card berth as they looked to defend their Super Bowl title. They traveled to the Meadowlands to face the New York Giants for the first time in postseason history at Giants Stadium. The Giants' defense shut down the 49ers, limiting them to just a field goal, as New York prevailed 17–3.

In an interview after the game, Giants head coach Bill Parcells — a believer in "old-school" tough defense over finesse-oriented offense featuring frequent, high-percentage passing — famously derided the 49ers' offense with the statement: "What do you think of that West Coast offense now?" This moniker would gain popularity when describing offenses that placed a greater emphasis on passing than on running.

More than 30 years later, Parcells would allege that 49ers head coach Bill Walsh cheated during the playoff game by deliberately sabotaging his own team's headsets during the first series. By NFL rules, this would have meant that the opposing team must shut off its headsets until both sets were fully functional. Since the 49ers were known to script their plays during their opening offensive series, this would have given them an unfair advantage.

=== 1986 Divisional Playoff Game ===
In one of the most lopsided playoff defeats in NFL history, the Giants routed the 49ers with a final score of 49–3. Late in the first half, Giants nose tackle Jim Burt delivered a brutal hit on Joe Montana just as the quarterback released a pass. The pass wobbled into the hands of Giants' linebacker Lawrence Taylor, who returned it 34 yards for a touchdown. “That play was like dropping the H-bomb on them,” Taylor later said. The hit knocked Montana out of the game and sent him to the hospital with a concussion. The Giants went on to win Super Bowl XXI that year.

During warmups, Parcells confronted Walsh on what he saw as cheating the year before, and warned that he would report Walsh to the league if it happened again. Parcells alleged that Walsh responded with a wink and said "it's just a little gamesmanship." Parcells would never report the 49ers to the NFL, and said this was the start of a mutual respect between himself and Walsh.

=== 1990 NFC Championship Game ===
Having won back-to-back Super Bowls behind quarterback Joe Montana in 1988 and 1989, the 49ers appeared poised to make NFL history by becoming the first team to three-peat in the Super Bowl era as they entered their matchup against the Giants in the NFC Championship Game as heavy favorites.

One of the most memorable moments of the game came when Joe Montana was knocked out on a blindside hit by Giants defensive end Leonard Marshall. While attempting to evade linebacker Lawrence Taylor, who was rushing from his right, Montana backed directly into Marshall’s oncoming pass rush and was driven to the turf, knocking him out of the game.

In the final minutes of the game, Giants nose tackle Erik Howard delivered a hit on 49ers running back Roger Craig, causing him to fumble. The ball was recovered by Lawrence Taylor, setting up a dramatic finish. On the final play of the game, placekicker Matt Bahr stepped onto the field and drilled a game-winning 42-yard field goal, sealing the victory for the Giants. The kick sent New York to Super Bowl XXV, where they would go on to defeat the Buffalo Bills.

The game is most notable for play-by-play announcer Pat Summerall's quote "there will be no three-peat" after Bahr made the field goal. The NFL in its 100 Greatest game series named it the 25th greatest game of all time.

=== 1993 NFC Divisional Playoff Game ===
49ers running back Ricky Watters rushed for 118 yards and a playoff-record five touchdowns as San Francisco crushed the Giants 44–3 to advance to the NFC Championship Game. It was one of the most lopsided defeats in NFL playoff history. This game also marked the final appearance for both Simms and linebacker Lawrence Taylor, who announced their retirements shortly afterward.

=== 2002: Cortez kicks game winner ===
The Giants faced the 49ers on national television during Thursday Night Football. New York outgained San Francisco 361–279 but committed three turnovers while forcing only one. The game was tied 13–13 when Giants running back Tiki Barber scored on a 1-yard touchdown run with 1:55 remaining. However, 49ers quarterback Jeff Garcia led a late drive down to the Giants' 19-yard line, where kicker Jose Cortez connected on a 36-yard field goal with six seconds left, giving San Francisco a dramatic 16–13 victory.

=== 2002 NFC Wild Card Game ===
Later in the 2002 season, the Giants and 49ers met again in the NFC Wild Card round in San Francisco. The Giants built a commanding 38–14 lead late in the third quarter. However, Jeff Garcia led one of the most incredible comebacks in NFL playoff history. He guided the 49ers to three touchdown drives, scoring 25 unanswered points to give San Francisco a 39–38 lead with just over a minute remaining. The Giants, however, had one final chance. Quarterback Kerry Collins drove New York down to San Francisco’s 23-yard line, setting up for a potential game-winning field goal with six seconds left. But the snap from long snapper Trey Junkin was too low, forcing holder Matt Allen to scramble and throw a desperate pass, which fell incomplete. The 49ers held on for a stunning 39–38 victory. The 24-point comeback remains the second-largest in NFL playoff history.

In a rare move, the day after the game, the NFL issued a formal written apology to the Giants for a missed call by the officials on the final play. The league acknowledged that the referees had failed to call a clear pass interference penalty against San Francisco, which would have offset another penalty called against the Giants. Had the correct call been made, New York would have had another opportunity to attempt a 41-yard game-winning field goal. However, the result of the game stood.

=== 2011 NFC Championship Game ===
After the 49ers defeated the Giants at Candlestick Park during the regular season, the two teams met again in the NFC Championship Game in San Francisco.

The game went into overtime after 49ers kicker David Akers tied it with a 25-yard field goal. During overtime, 49ers punt returner Kyle Williams was stripped of the football by Giants linebacker Jacquian Williams during a punt return. New York recovered the fumble, setting up K Lawrence Tynes, who kicked the game-winning field goal to send the Giants to Super Bowl XLVI, where they went on to defeat the New England Patriots.

== Season-by-season results ==
San Francisco 49ers vs. New York Giants Season-by-Season Results
1950s (Giants, 2–1)

Season	Results	Location	Overall series	Notes
1952	Giants; 23–14	Polo Grounds	Giants; 1–0	
1956	Giants; 38–21	Kezar Stadium	Giants; 2–0	Giants won 1956 NFL Championship.
1957	49ers 27–17	Yankee Stadium	Giants; 2–1	

1960s (Giants, 2–1)

Season	Results	Location	Overall series	Notes
1960	Giants; 21–19	Kezar Stadium	Giants; 3–1	Last meeting in Kezar Stadium.
1963	Giants; 48–14	Yankee Stadium	Giants; 4–1	Giants lost 1963 NFL Championship.
1968	49ers 26–10	Yankee Stadium	Giants; 4–2	Last meeting in Yankee Stadium.

1970s (Giants, 5–0)

Season	Results	Location	Overall series	Notes
1972	Giants; 23–17	Candlestick Park	Giants; 5–2	First meeting at Candlestick Park.
1975	Giants; 26–23	Candlestick Park	Giants; 6–2	
1977	Giants; 20–17	Giants Stadium	Giants; 7–2	First meeting at Giants Stadium.
1978	Giants; 27–10	Giants Stadium	Giants; 8–2	
1979	Giants; 32–16	Giants Stadium	Giants; 9–2	

1980s (49ers, 8–3)

Season	Results	Location	Overall series	Notes
1980	49ers 12–0	Candlestick Park	Giants; 9–3	
1981	49ers 17–10	Candlestick Park	Giants; 9–4	
1981 playoffs	49ers 38–24	Candlestick Park	Giants 9–5	NFC Divisional playoffs. First postseason meeting in the series. 49ers win Super Bowl XVI.
1984	49ers 31–10	Giants Stadium	Giants; 9–6	
1984 playoffs	49ers 21–10	Candlestick Park	Giants 9–7	NFC Divisional playoffs. Second postseason meeting in the series. 49ers win Super Bowl XIX.
1985 playoffs	Giants 17–3	Giants Stadium	Giants 10–7	NFC Wild Card playoffs. Third postseason meeting in the series. Defending champions dethroned.
1986	Giants; 21–17	Candlestick Park	Giants; 11–7	Giants overcame a 17–0 second-half deficit.
1986 playoffs	Giants 49–3	Giants Stadium	Giants 12–7	NFC Divisional playoffs. Fourth postseason meeting in six years. Giants win Super Bowl XXI.
1987	49ers 41–21	Giants Stadium	Giants; 12–8	
1988	49ers 20–17	Giants Stadium	Giants; 12–9	49ers win Super Bowl XXIII.
1989	49ers 34–24	Candlestick Park	Giants; 12–10	49ers win Super Bowl XXIV.

1990s (49ers, 5–2)

Season	Results	Location	Overall series	Notes
1990	49ers 7–3	Candlestick Park	Giants; 12–11	This meeting came one week after both teams suffered their first defeats of the season.
1990 playoffs	Giants 15–13	Candlestick Park	Giants 13–11	NFC Championship Game. The Giants end the 49ers' quest for a Super Bowl three-peat. Giants win Super Bowl XXV.
1991	Giants; 16–14	Giants Stadium	Giants; 14–11	
1992	49ers 31–14	Giants Stadium	Giants; 14–12	
1993 playoffs	49ers 44–3	Candlestick Park	Giants 14–13	NFC Divisional playoffs. Sixth postseason meeting. The final game in the career of Phil Simms.
1995	49ers 20–6	3Com Park	Tie; 14–14	
1998	49ers 31–7	3Com Park	49ers 15–14	49ers take their first lead in the series.

2000s (Giants, 3–2)

Season	Results	Location	Overall series	Notes
2002	49ers 16–13	Giants Stadium	49ers 16–14	NFL Kickoff Game.
2002 playoffs	49ers 39–38	3Com Park	49ers 17–14	NFC Wild Card playoffs. The 49ers overcame a 38–14 deficit and the Giants botched a last-second game-winning field goal attempt, but controversially ended without an obvious pass interference against the 49ers being called. The 24-point blown lead set a new Giants franchise record for largest blown lead.
2005	Giants; 24–6	Monster Park	49ers 17–15	
2007	Giants; 33–15	Giants Stadium	49ers 17–16	Giants win Super Bowl XLII.
2008	Giants; 29–17	Giants Stadium	Tie; 17–17	Final meeting at Giants Stadium.

2010s (Giants, 4–3)

Season	Results	Location	Overall series	Notes
2011	49ers 27–20	Candlestick Park	49ers 18–17	
2011 playoffs	Giants 20–17 (OT)	Candlestick Park	Tie 18–18	NFC Championship Game. The only meeting to end in overtime. Giants win Super Bowl XLVI. Last postseason meeting to date.
2012	Giants; 26–3	Candlestick Park	Giants; 19–18	Last meeting in Candlestick Park. 49ers lose Super Bowl XLVII.
2014	49ers 16–10	MetLife Stadium	Tie; 19–19	First meeting at MetLife Stadium.
2015	Giants; 30–27	MetLife Stadium	Giants; 20–19	
2017	49ers 31–21	Levi's Stadium	Tie; 20–20	First meeting at Levi's Stadium. 49ers get their first win of the season after a 0–9 start.
2018	Giants; 27–23	Levi's Stadium	Giants; 21–20	Final start in the series for Eli Manning.

2020s (49ers, 3–0)

Season	Results	Location	Overall series	Notes
2020	49ers 36–9	MetLife Stadium	Tie; 21–21	No fans in attendance due to COVID-19 pandemic.
2023	49ers 30–12	Levi's Stadium	49ers 22–21	49ers lose Super Bowl LVIII.
2025	49ers 34–24	MetLife Stadium	49ers 23–21	
2026	December 6	MetLife Stadium	49ers 23–21	

Summary of Results

Season	Season series	at San Francisco 49ers	at New York Giants	Notes
Regular season	49ers 19–17	49ers 9–8	49ers 10–9	
Postseason	Tie 4–4	49ers 4–2	Giants 2–0	NFC Wild Card: 1985, 2002; NFC Divisional: 1981, 1984, 1986, 1993; NFC Championship: 1990, 2011
Regular and postseason	49ers 23–21	49ers 13–10	Giants 11–10	

== See also ==
- Giants–Yankees rivalry, a baseball rivalry between MLB New York Yankees and San Francisco Giants clubs (the latter of whom the Giants football club was named after)
