= California exodus =

Emigration from California

The California exodus is the ongoing emigration of residents from California to other U.S. states or Mexico that started in the late twentieth century. Common reasons for Californians leaving their home state include the high cost of living, crime, politics, taxes, pollution, and traffic. Texas is the leading destination of California's former residents, followed by Arizona, Nevada, Washington state, and Florida. The term has also been used to describe businesses leaving California, citing tax levels or regulations.

== Origins of the term ==
In 1989, the San Francisco Examiner and Knight Ridder called the trend of California residents emigrating to other states the "California exodus" while the Los Angeles Times dubbed it the "Great California Exodus" in 1991.

== Demographics ==
Net domestic migration, California
Year	In-migrants	Out-migrants	Net
2010	444,749	573,988	–129,239
2011	468,428	562,343	–93,915
2012	493,641	566,986	–73,345
2013	485,477	581,679	–96,202
2014	513,968	593,308	–79,340
2015	514,477	643,710	–129,233
2016	514,758	657,690	–142,932
2017	523,131	661,026	–137,895
2018	501,023	691,145	–190,122
2019	480,204	653,551	–173,347
2021	433,402	841,065	–407,663
2022	475,803	817,669	–341,866
2023	422,075	690,127	–268,052
2024	406,873	661,205	–254,332

California joined the United States after the Mexican–American War. Like much of the land ceded from Mexico in the war, California had only a small non-Native population. However, the California gold rush led to a population boom, during which California gained statehood in 1850. Between the 1850 and 1860 censuses, its population more than quadrupled. It saw a second period of growth after World War II thanks to the aerospace and defense industries, and a third during the 1980s and early 1990s because of the Silicon Valley tech industry. Population growth slowed in the mid-1990s as the federal government cut aerospace spending after the end of the Cold War.

The state has had a net loss of domestic migrants every year since about 1989. According to the San Francisco Examiner, in 1989, most of those leaving California were people born in the state. In 1993, the level of emigration from California was the highest in its recorded history. From 1995 to 2000, California had the second largest net domestic outmigration, mostly to Nevada, Arizona, Georgia, North Carolina, and Colorado, while it gained migrants from abroad. Its net migration rate over this period was –25%, the 7th highest after Hawaii (–65%), Alaska (–51%), New York (–49%), North Dakota (–41%), Illinois (–30%), and Wyoming (–27%). In 1955–1960, the ten largest state-to-state migration flows involving California all had the state as a recipient of people, while in 1995–2000, nine of the ten largest flows involving the state had California as a net loser, with only New York sending more people to California than it received in return. The New York exodus has been regularly compared to the outmigration in California. The dot-com crash also motivated further emigration during the late 1990s and early 2000s. Although the numbers of emigrants exceeded those of immigrants from within the United States, the continued arrival of immigrants from outside the United States led to a general increase in California's population during the 1990s.

According to Census Bureau estimates, 6.2 million people left the state in the 2010s decade, while 4.9 million moved in: a net loss of 1.3 million residents. From 2011 to 2015, the California exodus was substantial in absolute terms but small in net migration rate, with a considerable imbalance between inflows and outflows of migrants. New York had higher net loss than California across these three metrics.

According to the California Department of Finance, the state had 135,600 more people move out than moved in from July 2019 to July 2020, marking the third straight year of net migration losses. After peaking just shy of 40 million Californians, by 2020 into 2022 onward this slowing had crossed the zero population growth mark into outright negative population growth for the first time in over a century. The exodus increased in 2021, when more than 360,000 people moved out of California, especially going to states like Texas, Arizona, Washington, Idaho, and Utah. Some also moved to Mexico to avoid the 2021–2023 inflation surge, as Mexico's cost of living is lower. According to the 2021 American Community Survey (ACS), California had the 4th highest "stickiness" compared to other states, defined by the Federal Reserve Bank of Dallas as the share of people born in a state who still lived in that state (which was 73% for California). According to the 2022 ACS, California had the lowest (11.1%) immigration rate (number of people moving into a state as a share of that state's total number of movers), despite a large number of in-movers.

The exodus accelerated with the COVID-19 pandemic. Between April 2020 and July 2022, the state's population dropped by more than 500,000 people. In July 2023, the California Department of Finance reviewed its population forecast for 2060 and concluded that the state's population would stay constant at about 40 million people, instead of reaching 53 million as estimated in 2013. In October 2023, the Stanford Institute for Economic Policy Research found that California was "hemorrhaging residents to neighboring states like Texas, Arizona, and Nevada" at "higher levels than ever before", across all income levels, and especially among college graduates. According to the Public Policy Institute of California, California used to gain college graduates and higher-income households and is now losing them, although at a relatively small rate (0.4% in 2022–2023). California's population grew in 2023 for the first time since 2020, driven by lower mortality after the end of the pandemic and higher legal foreign immigration. However, net migration was still negative (259,000 residents left for other states) and the population growth was low (+0.17%). In 2024, the state's population increased again; although it had the highest number of residents who moved to another state (–240,000), it received the second-highest number of immigrants from abroad (+361,000). Without foreign immigration, California's population would shrink, making the state vulnerable to immigration-policy shifts. California has the highest negative net migration rate among all age groups. Californians leaving are younger, wealthier and higher educated than average. In 2025, California's population dropped by 9,000, the largest drop of any state.

== Causes ==
A 1995 study published in Geographical Review attributed various causes for emigration from California:

Military base closures, businesses abandoning a state regarded as overregulated and tax-unfriendly, and growing unease about the attainability of an idyllic life along the Pacific Slope began a trend that has gained volume and velocity. By late 1992 quality-of-life surveys found residents' perceptions of California had reached an all-time low, with only 30 percent considering the state "one of the best places to live". Social disorders and natural disasters in both southern and northern California further unsettled an economy that had been little more than dyspeptic since 1988 ... Symptoms of more than a substantial malaise, they indicate a great change. The causes of change may be subject to debate, but their galvanizing effect is beyond challenge: Californians began to emigrate.

=== For individuals ===
The primary cause of the exodus is the high cost of living (and especially the cost of housing), followed by issues such as crime, politics, pollution, and traffic. Kenneth P. Miller said in 2022 that taxes, as well as rising costs on housing, food, and other needs and wants, are the biggest reasons for Californians leaving the state. The rise of remote work also made it easier for people to leave California, especially for college graduates and higher-income households. High-income Californians mostly move to states without income taxes (Alaska, Florida, Nevada, New Hampshire, South Dakota, Tennessee, Texas, Washington, and Wyoming). A New York Times Upshot analysis found that partisanship plays a significant role: more Republicans have moved out of California than any other state. According to Steven Malanga from the Manhattan Institute for Policy Research, liberals are less likely than politically conservatives to leave the state. According to the Public Policy Institute of California, 39% of those who left California between the 2020 and 2024 presidential elections were Republicans, compared to 25% of all California registrants. 54% of those who moved to California were Democratic, compared to 45% of Californians overall. In the late 1990s and 2000s, employment was the main reason for relocation. Since 2015, cost of living (and especially housing) has become the most important factor. At least 6 of the State's 250 billionaires left California in 2025 to avoid the proposed 5% wealth tax.

==== Housing ====
California has repeatedly been ranked as one of the country’s most expensive states to live in. The median asking price for a house was $797,470 in California in 2022, which only a quarter of households in the state can afford. Economists have cited restrictive zoning policies and lack of investment in transportation infrastructure that has resulted in sprawl, constrained housing supply, high housing prices, and severe congestion. They also cited over-reliance on sales tax, fees, and disproportionate property taxes on new residents caused by 1978 California Proposition 13.

=== For businesses ===
California had the highest net outflow of domestic companies across the US from 2015 to 2025. Texas, Florida, Tennessee and North Carolina are the main destinations. The most cited reasons for relocation are regulations and availability of skilled workers. In 2010, The Orange County Register noted an "exodus of businesses out of California" due to high costs. Since 2019, more than 200 businesses have left California, the most of any American state. Examples include Charles Schwab, Oracle, Palantir, Hewlett Packard Enterprise, and Chevron. Texas has received many of the new headquarters. Elon Musk's companies Tesla and SpaceX relocated their headquarters to Texas in 2021 and 2024 respectively. According to the Bay Area Council Economic Institute, the share of new jobs placed in California fell significantly for Hewlett Packard Enterprise, Tesla, and Snowflake after they moved their headquarters, while it stayed similar for Charles Schwab. From July 2022 to July 2024, Californian cities had the worst job performance in knowledge industries (information, financial services, and professional and business services sectors), while Houston and Miami performed best. In 2024, Fortune 1000 companies headquartered in California posted 25% of their jobs in-state, down from 33% before the pandemic. Several film and TV productions also left California for other US states (such as Georgia) or other countries (such as the UK, Ireland, and Hungary). In 2024, TV production in Hollywood was down 53% compared to its five-year average.

According to the Hoover Institution, businesses leave California due to "taxes, regulations, litigation costs, labor costs, energy and utility costs, and employee cost of living". Store chains Nordstrom and Whole Foods and shopping mall operator Westfield also mentioned safety issues as a reason to stop operating in some parts of California.

== Consequences ==
The exodus has cost California one seat in the House of Representatives after the 2020 U.S. Census.

In the 2020 redistricting cycle based on the 2020 census, California lost a seat in the House of Representatives for the first time in its history, going from 53 to 52 seats. As of 2026, California is expected to lose four seats after the 2030 census.

According to data from the Internal Revenue Service, migration of the taxpayers out of California resulted in California being the biggest income loser ($24 billion) in 2022. The departure of enterprises and workers undermines California's economic system: between 2011 and 2021, California lost $102 billion in net adjusted gross income due to domestic emigration according to the National Taxpayers Union Foundation.

== By location ==
=== San Francisco ===
Following the COVID-19 pandemic, many tech workers have embraced remote work, causing about a third of the commercial real estate in downtown San Francisco to be empty. Between 2020 and 2023, nearly 40 retail stores have closed around Union Square. Some observers theorized that San Francisco could enter a "doom loop", while others argues that these claims were exaggerated and that the crisis was isolated to downtown San Francisco rather than citywide and that San Francisco had always been a "boom and bust" city. According to US Census estimates, from 2020 to 2022, San Francisco's population declined by more than 60,000 people, or more than 7%. In 2023, the city's population increased, with the AI boom cited as a contributing factor.

== See also ==
- California Dream
- California–Texas rivalry
- Depopulation of the Great Plains
- Go West, young man
- List of U.S. states and territories by net migration#Net domestic migration
- Sun Belt
- White flight
