= Young Political Majors =

Consulting firm

Young Political Majors, LLC was a private consulting firm which registered people to vote as Republicans. It operated in several states including California, Florida, Arizona and Massachusetts. The firm was accused of misleading voters into registering as Republicans.

== California operations ==
Mark Jacoby was arrested in California on October 18, 2008, and charged with two counts of felony voter registration fraud and two counts of perjury. The California Republican Party hired Jacoby's firm and paid it $7 – 12 for every Californian it registered as a member of the GOP. Dan Goldfine, an attorney for Jacoby, denied any wrongdoing by his client and called the charges "baseless," saying the arrest outside an Ontario hotel was part of a "long pattern of harassment against Mr. Jacoby for an entirely valid voter registration effort."

On October 16, 2009, Jacoby pleaded guilty to a misdemeanor count of voter registration fraud before Los Angeles Superior Court Judge David Horwitz, who sentenced him to three years probation, 30 days of Caltrans service and the requirement to show proof that he is registered to vote at his correct address in Laguna Beach. As part of the plea agreement, the Judge dismissed two felony counts of perjury and one felony count of voter registration fraud.

== Florida operations ==
In the summer of 2004, Jacoby appeared at the Gainesville election office with about 1,200 voter registration cards, of which 510 showed a switch to the Republican party. Elections Supervisor Beverly Hill says she was suspicious and randomly called some of the Republicans to verify they wanted to switch, but all of them said, "Absolutely not...They didn't even know they had signed a registration form."

YPM worked for JSM Inc., which worked for Arno Political Consultants, a Sacramento, California firm that qualified 300 ballot initiatives in 20 states, including Florida's class size amendment. According to Mindy Tucker Fletcher, a senior adviser to the Florida GOP, the Republican National Committee had hired Arno for a voter registration drive. Arno claimed that Jacoby showed Arno copies of voter registration cards in "their handwriting. They signed it. They checked the party affiliation...Why would they have a change of heart?"
