= Edenly =

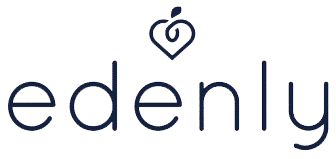
- Company type: Privately held
- Industry: e-Commerce
- Founded: 2008
- Headquarters: Geneva, Switzerland
- Products: jewellery

Edenly is a Switzerland-based company that sells jewellery. It was founded in 2008 and is headquartered in Geneva, Switzerland. The company is a player in the diamond and gold jewelry segments.

== History and operations ==
Edenly was founded in 2008 in Geneva, Switzerland by Edwin Suzor, an engineer who had previously worked at an e-commerce consulting firm until 2008. He met the Christian Bernard Group, a manufacturer of gold jewels in Europe that specialize in paving diamonds, and created a joint venture to make future Edenly models. Initial jewelry designs were inspired by traditional French jewelry and later new designs were introduced by Edenly's design team.

The company is engaged in cutting and polishing diamonds as well as jewelry manufacturing and retailing. Instead of working as a conventional jewelry store, the company relies on its online portal.

In 2011, Edenly started shipping their products to UK, US, Canada and to the Spanish and Italian markets in 2012. In 2014, it launched its Jardin Enchanté collection and started shipping to the Netherlands.

== Products ==
In its early years, Edenly focused on the manufacturing of jewelry and the cutting and polishing of diamonds. It later emerged as a retailer of jewelry.

The company sources diamonds and other gemstones, and designs its own range of jewelry.
