= California–Texas rivalry =

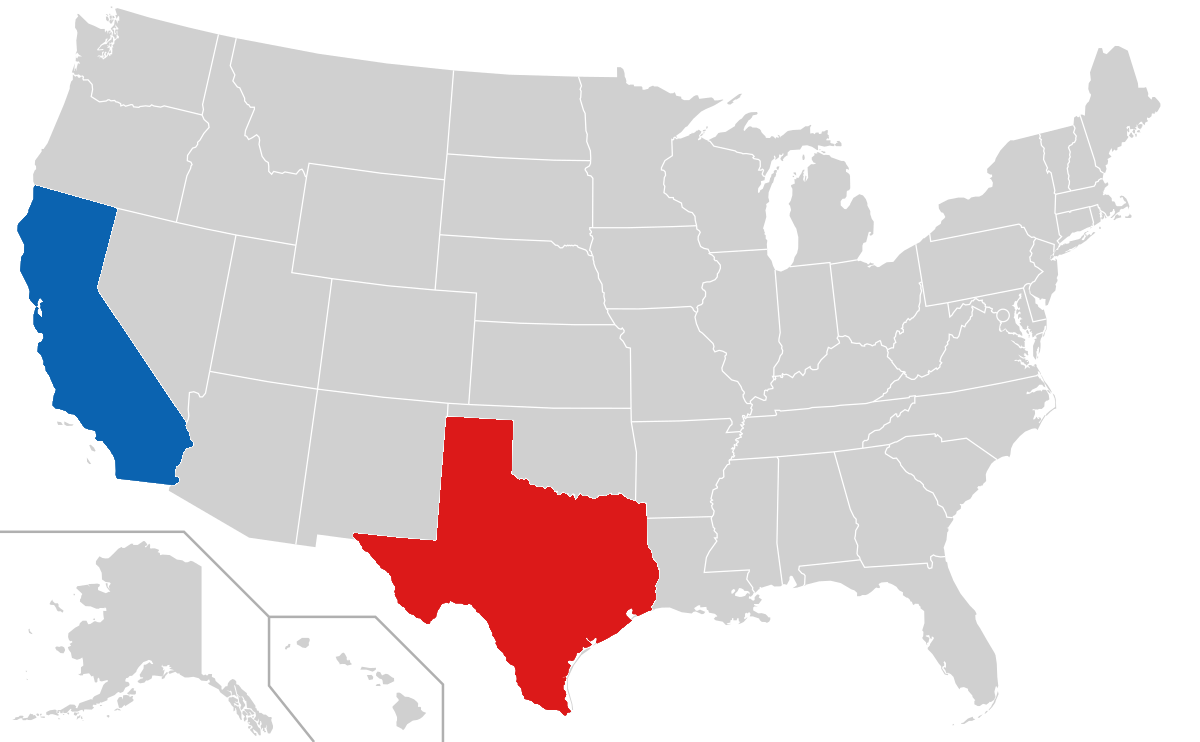
Map of the United States highlighting California and Texas

The California–Texas rivalry (or the Texas–California rivalry) is a rhetorical rivalry between the two U.S. states of California and Texas. Since the turn of the 21st century, California and Texas have been the United States' two most populous states. They are the two largest states in the contiguous U.S., with the two largest economies, and both have a significant amount of unique state culture. The territories of both states, located in the Sun Belt, were also once part of Mexico.

The states are often opposed politically, with California being liberal or progressive and generally supporting the Democratic Party, while Texas is conservative and generally supports the Republican Party. Texas is commonly seen as having little government intervention and regulation, while in California the state takes a larger role in public policies. There are also exceptions, discussed as part of the perceived rivalry, in which Texas has increased state intervention against immigration and abortion whereas California has reduced state intervention.

== Politics ==
One area in which the rivalry between California and Texas has been described is politics.

The Democratic Party has had a trifecta in California since 2011, while the Republican Party had a trifecta in Texas from 2003 to 2026. Democrats have won the United States presidential elections in California in every election since 1992, while Republicans have won the United States presidential elections in Texas in every election since 1980.

California has enacted numerous progressive policies, such as Medicaid expansion, a $15-per-hour minimum wage, and significant actions to reduce climate change, hence being hailed as a global leader in climate action. Meanwhile, Texas has adopted various conservative policies, such as reducing taxes (e.g., prohibiting an income tax), restricting abortion rights, protecting gun rights, and fostering a business-friendly climate.

Voters look to both states for examples of how policies from across the political spectrum would look if implemented nationally. Many companies have moved to Texas due to lower taxes and regulations, significant tax incentives and cheap housing, as well as California's stricter response to the COVID-19 pandemic. Elon Musk, the CEO of Tesla, Inc. and SpaceX, has notably moved Tesla's "Gigafactory" and global headquarters to Texas. While Texas has largely welcomed new businesses, the fear of socially progressive attitudes migrating to the state from California has led to a degree of backlash in the state, including Texas Governor Greg Abbott running his re-election campaign in 2018 on the slogan "Don't California My Texas." However, an Upshot analysis in 2024 found that partisanship itself, whether intentional or not, plays a powerful role when American domestic migration. California has contributed to this trend by exporting Republicans en masse and more Republicans have moved out of California than any other state and made the states they moved to redder in the process especially Texas, Arizona, Florida and Nevada.

== Sports ==
Due to the cultural differences, there often exist multiple rivalries between sports teams in either California or Texas, such as:

- Astros–Dodgers rivalry
- Angels–Rangers rivalry
- 49ers–Cowboys rivalry
- Cowboys–Rams rivalry
- Lakers–Spurs rivalry

== Similarities ==
Despite the rivalry, the two states share much in common, and only began to diverge significantly by the end of the 20th century. California was once considered a Republican stronghold, being the home state of Republicans Richard Nixon and Ronald Reagan. Texas was also once considered a Democratic stronghold, being the home state of Democrat Lyndon B. Johnson.

Both states are over 39% Hispanic. They have the highest proportion of Hispanics outside of New Mexico and Puerto Rico.

== See also ==
- California v. Texas
- California exodus
- Free State Project
