= Lakers–Spurs rivalry =

National Basketball Association rivalry

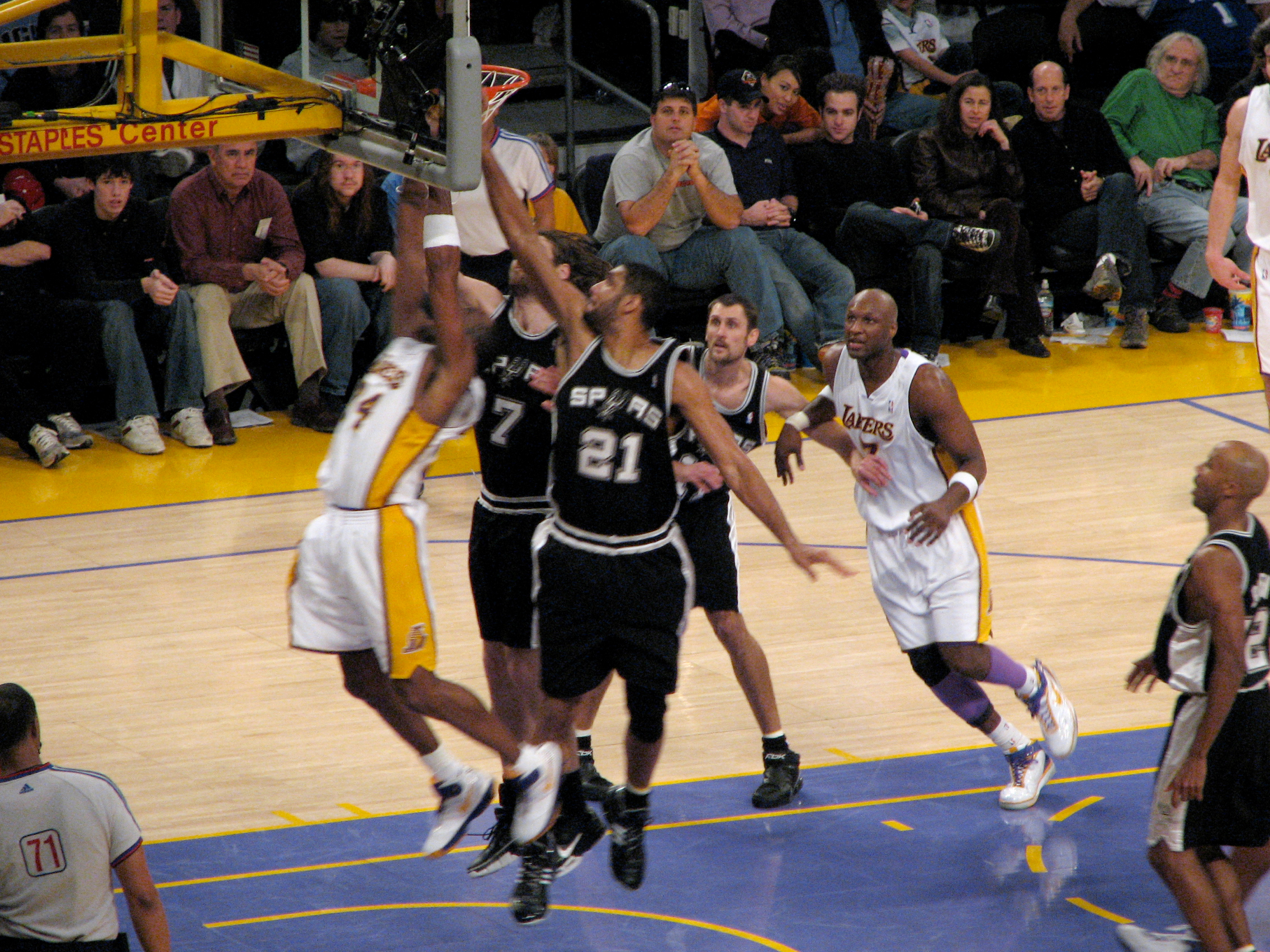
- Lakers player Kobe Bryant (No. 24 in white) goes up for a layup while Spurs player Tim Duncan (No. 21 in black) is defending.

- Los Angeles Lakers San Antonio Spurs
- First meeting: December 3, 1976; Lakers 114, Spurs 105
- Latest meeting: February 10, 2026; Spurs 136, Lakers 108
- Next meeting: November 27, 2026

Statistics
- Total meetings: 252
- All-time series: 133–119 (LAL)
- Regular season series: 99–97 (LAL)
- Postseason results: 34–22 (LAL)
- Longest win streak: SAS W8
- Current win streak: SAS W3

Postseason history
- 1982 Western Conference Finals: Lakers won, 4–0; 1983 Western Conference Finals: Lakers won, 4–2; 1986 Western Conference First Round: Lakers won, 3–0; 1988 Western Conference First Round: Lakers won, 3–0; 1995 Western Conference Semifinals: Spurs won, 4–2; 1999 Western Conference Semifinals: Spurs won, 4–0; 2001 Western Conference Finals: Lakers won, 4–0; 2002 Western Conference Semifinals: Lakers won, 4–1; 2003 Western Conference Semifinals: Spurs won, 4–2; 2004 Western Conference Semifinals: Lakers won, 4–2; 2008 Western Conference Finals: Lakers won, 4–1; 2013 Western Conference First Round: Spurs won, 4–0

Locations of the Los Angeles Lakers and San Antonio Spurs.

The Lakers–Spurs rivalry is a National Basketball Association (NBA) rivalry between the Los Angeles Lakers and the San Antonio Spurs. The rivalry started in the late 1970s and peaked from the late 1990s into the late 2000s. Since 1999, the teams have met in the NBA playoffs 7 times, with the clubs combining to appear in seven straight NBA Finals from 1999–2005. Additionally, the teams won each NBA Title from 1999–2003 (the Spurs won in 1999 and 2003, while the Lakers won in 2000, 2001, and 2002). From 1999–2004, the rivalry was considered as the NBA's best, as each time the clubs faced each other in the playoffs, the winner advanced to the NBA Finals. The rivalry fell off from 2005–07, with the Lakers missing the playoffs in 2005 and losing in the first round to the Phoenix Suns in 2006 and 2007, but intensified again in 2008 when they met in the Western Conference Finals, and later on, again in the first round of the 2013 Western Conference playoffs. Both teams cemented their status as the NBA dynasties of the 2000s.

As of the end of the 2024–25 season, the Lakers are the only team with a winning overall record against San Antonio.

== Background ==
The Lakers were founded as the Detroit Gems in 1946 before relocating to Minneapolis, Minnesota and renaming themselves the Lakers (Minnesota's nickname is "The Land of 10,000 Lakes"). The club won several titles led by center George Mikan in the 1950s before moving to Los Angeles in 1960. In 1972 they won another championship led by center Wilt Chamberlain and point guard Jerry West. After acquiring center Kareem Abdul-Jabbar in 1975 and point guard Magic Johnson in 1979, the Lakers built a team that won 5 titles in the 1980s. With the retirement of Johnson and Abdul-Jabbar, they struggled in the 1990s. However, in 1996 the club acquired free agent center Shaquille O'Neal and traded with the Charlotte Hornets for newly drafted shooting guard Kobe Bryant. With the two maturing under coach Phil Jackson, the club turned into a contender in the early 2000s.

The Spurs, meanwhile, were founded as the Dallas Chaparrals in the American Basketball Association in 1967 before moving to San Antonio, Texas and renaming themselves the Spurs in 1973. When the ABA disbanded in 1976, the Spurs were one of four teams absorbed into the NBA. Led by prolific scorer George Gervin, the Spurs experienced regular season success in the 1970s and 1980s, but were unable to advance out of the Western Conference playoffs. After struggling in the latter half of the 1980s, they acquired center David Robinson in the 1987 NBA draft and the club's fortunes improved. Although they were competitive in the mid-1990s, they never advanced to the NBA Finals. In 1997, they acquired power forward Tim Duncan with the first pick in the draft. The 6'11" Duncan combined with the 7' Robinson to form what was dubbed the "Twin Towers" duo.

== Rivalry history ==
Although the Spurs and Lakers have played each other in the Western Conference since 1981, they weren't considered rivals until 1999, when the Spurs swept the Lakers 4–0, eventually winning their first NBA title. They had met in the 1982, 1983, 1986, 1988, and 1995 NBA Playoffs. In both the 1982 and 1983 playoffs, the Gervin-led Spurs made the Western Conference Finals, but the Lakers of Magic Johnson and Kareem Abdul-Jabbar eliminated the Spurs each time, preventing Gervin from reaching the NBA Finals. The Lakers easily swept the Alvin Robertson-led Spurs in the first round of both the 1986 and 1988 playoffs. Then in 1995, the Robinson-led Spurs made the conference finals by eliminating the Lakers, but would lose to the Houston Rockets in that round. In 1999, the Spurs swept the Lakers in four games in the Western Conference Semifinals. Game 4 was the last game at the Great Western Forum, the Lakers home since 1967. They moved into the Staples Center the following season.

=== Lakers and Spurs win five consecutive championships (1999–2003) ===
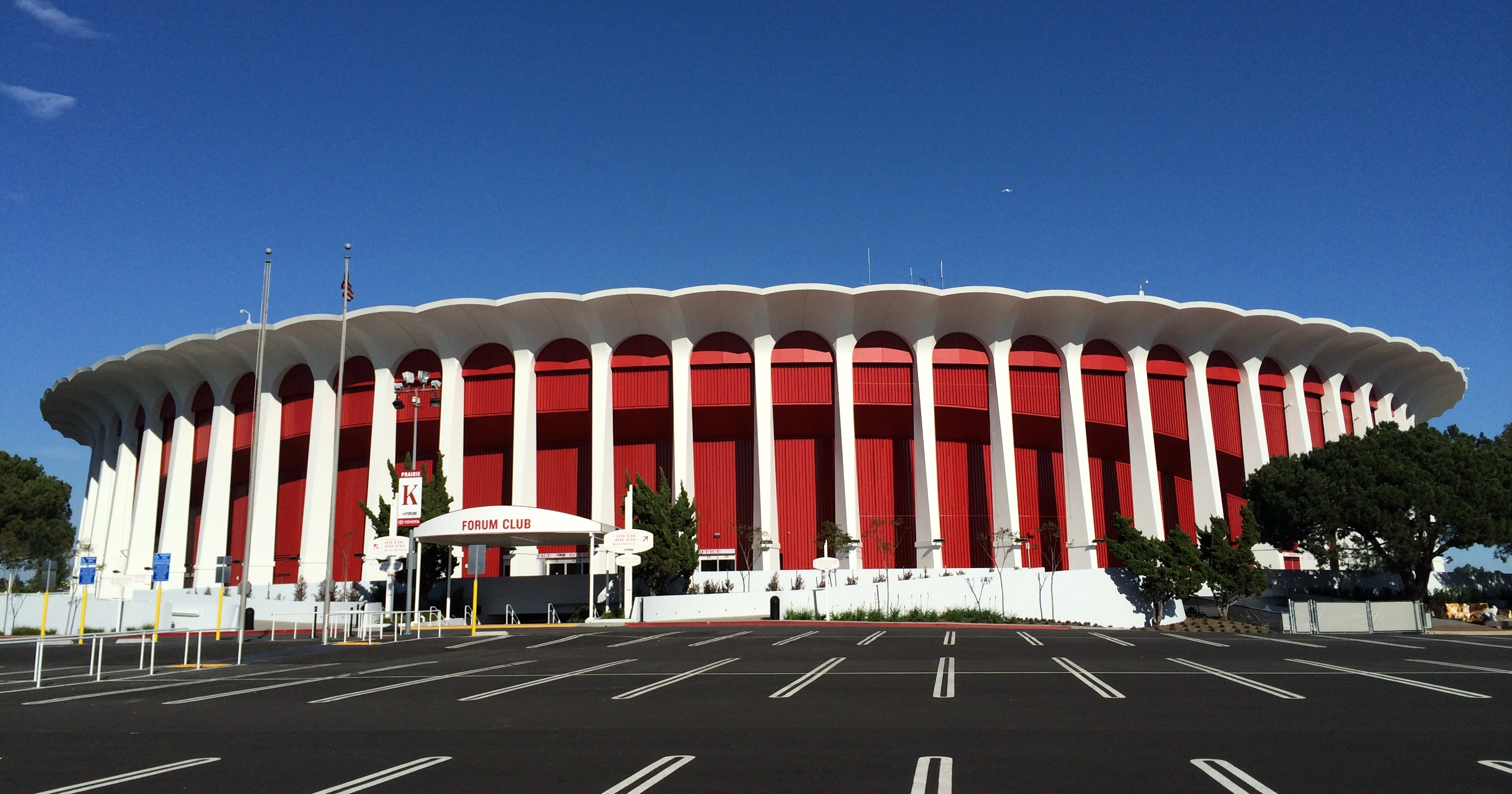
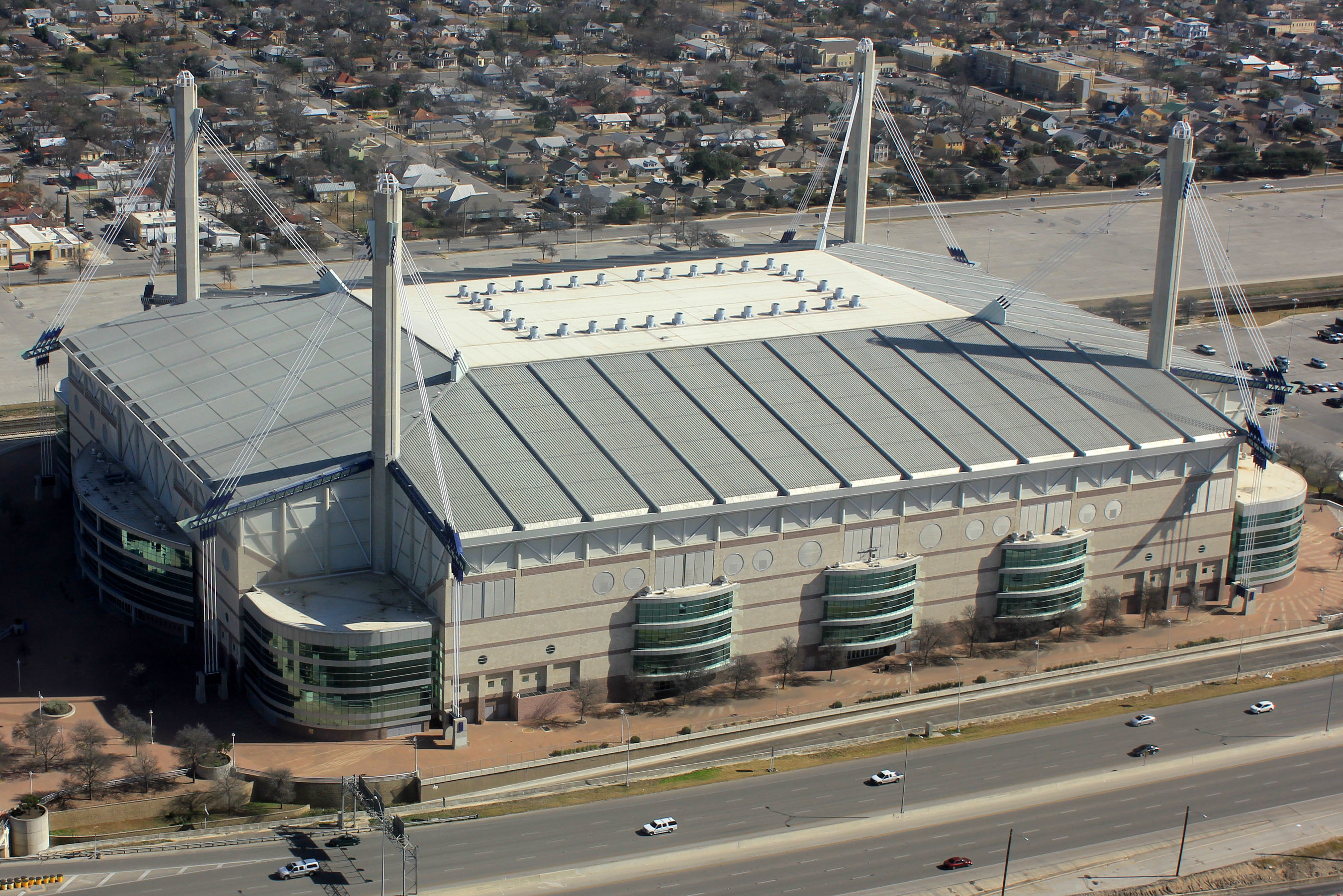
The Spurs and Lakers both closed each others home venue in the 1999 and 2002 playoffs.

The rivalry intensified with the Lakers' offseason hiring of former Chicago Bulls coach Phil Jackson before the 1999–2000 season. Jackson had previously commented that the Spurs title in 1999 should come with an asterisk. Jackson stated this because the title took place during a lockout-shortened season, and the three-time defending champion Bulls team (which Jackson coached) was dismantled before it was able to defend its 1998 title.

The following season the Lakers finished with the league's best record, and the Spurs struggled down the stretch after Duncan suffered a knee injury. With Duncan out for the playoffs, the Spurs were defeated 3–1 by the Phoenix Suns, themselves missing Jason Kidd and Tom Gugliotta, in the first round. The Lakers, meanwhile, defeated the Indiana Pacers 4–2 in the NBA Finals to win the club's first title since 1988. While the Lakers won the title, there was speculation that the Lakers would not have advanced to the Finals if they had faced the Spurs in the second round of the playoffs. In 2001, the Lakers, having swept the Portland Trail Blazers and Sacramento Kings, exacted revenge for their 1999 sweep by sweeping the Spurs in the Western Conference Finals. The series was very one-sided, with L.A. winning games by 39 and 29 points. They then won their 2nd straight title over the Philadelphia 76ers 4–1.

The teams faced off again in the 2002 Western Conference Semifinals. Again, the Lakers beat the Spurs. This time the Lakers won 4–1, as the Spurs led each game of the series going into the fourth quarter, but won just once. The Lakers went to play the Sacramento Kings in a thrilling seven-game series (which they won), on their to way to sweeping the New Jersey Nets in the NBA Finals. Like 1999, but with the sides reversed, the Lakers Game 5 win at Alamodome was the Spurs last game in that building.

The next year, they played in the 2003 Western Conference Semifinals. This time, the Spurs ended the Lakers' dynasty in 6 and went on to beat the back-to-back Eastern Conference champion Nets in the 2003 NBA Finals. One of the series' crucial moments came when the Lakers' Robert Horry, a well known clutch shooter, missed a potential game-winning 3 in Game 5. With another title won, David Robinson retired after the season. Robert Horry would then sign the Spurs the following season.

=== Kobe vs. Duncan (1997–2016) ===
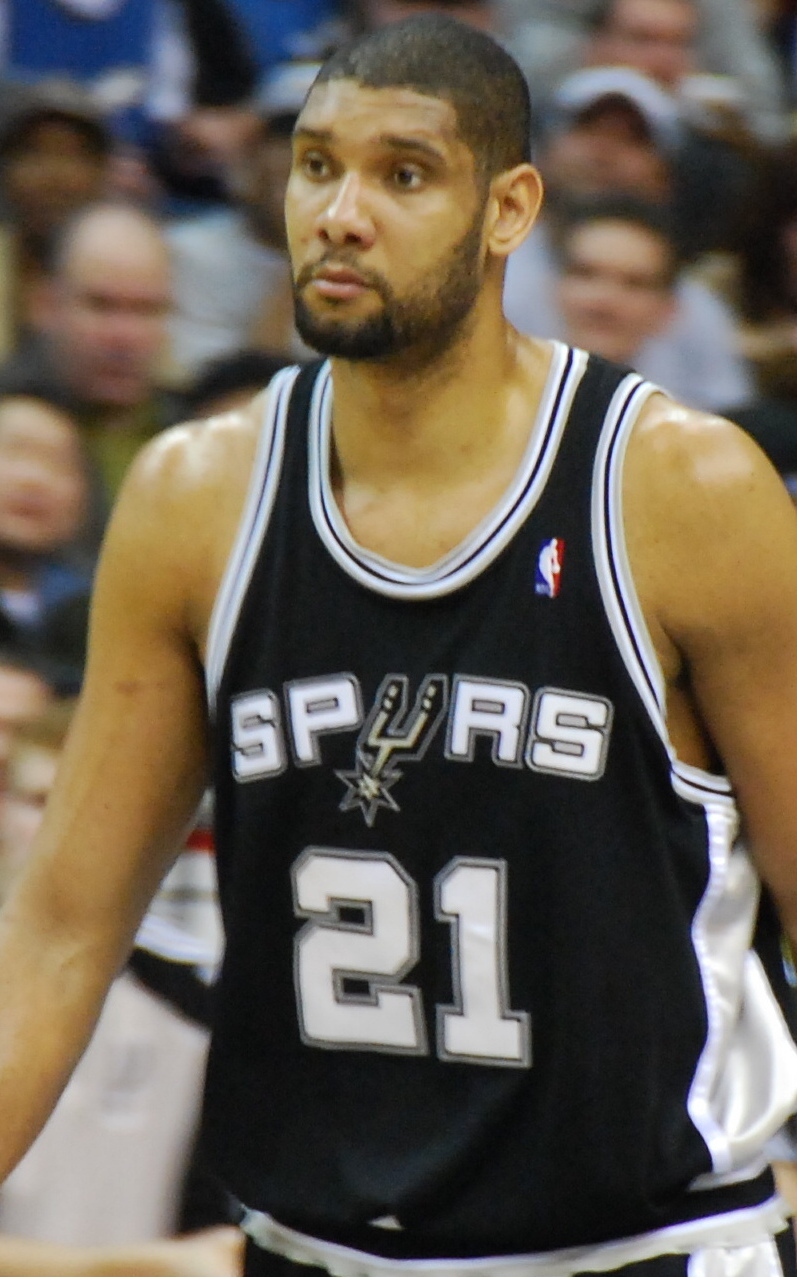
Kobe Bryant (left) and Tim Duncan (right), whose careers virtually ran simultaneously (Kobe played a year before Duncan in 1996-97), were considered two of the best players of their generation.

O'Neal was traded to the Miami Heat in the following offseason, and the Lakers missed the playoffs in 2005. Meanwhile, the Spurs won their third NBA Championship over the defending champion Pistons in a long, hard-fought 7-game series. The rivalry became dormant, as the Bryant-led Lakers started anew with a younger nucleus that lost in the first round in 2006 and 2007. Meanwhile, the Spurs were defeated by the Dallas Mavericks in the 2006 Western Conference Semifinals 4–3, but rebounded in 2007 to win their 4th Title in 9 years. Winning in 2005 and 2007 with the Spurs was former Lakers’ role player Robert Horry, who was now up to seven championships in his career (2 with the Rockets, 3 with the Lakers, 2 with the Spurs).

During the 2007–08 season, Bryant and the rebuilt Lakers reemerged as a contender. With the added help of Pau Gasol, a second-half acquisition from the Memphis Grizzlies, the team received the #1 seed in the West. The Spurs received the #3 seed. They met again in the 2008 Western Conference Finals. In Game 1, the Lakers overcame a 20-point 3rd quarter deficit to win 89–85 en route to defeating the defending champions 4–1 and advance to the NBA Finals, where they lost to the Boston Celtics.

In the 2008–09 and 2009–10 season, they did not meet in the playoffs. The Spurs were eliminated for the first time in the first round and second round by the Dallas Mavericks and Phoenix Suns respectively, while the Lakers went on to win the NBA Championship against the Orlando Magic in 2009 and the Boston Celtics in 2010.

The 2011 Playoffs was the first time since 2006 that neither appeared in the Western Conference Finals and for only the second time since 1999, neither team made the NBA Finals.

A new rivalry was formed with the arrival of Steve Nash and Dwight Howard to the Lakers in 2012. Nash was acquired in a sign-and-trade deal with Phoenix, while Howard was acquired in a blockbuster trade from Orlando Magic that also involved the Philadelphia 76ers and the Denver Nuggets. In their first game of the 2012–13 season, Danny Green hit a game-winner for the Spurs to win 84–82. The Spurs and Lakers met in the first round of the 2013 NBA playoffs, with the Spurs holding home-court advantage as they had a 58–24 record in contrast to the Lakers' 45–37 record. Unfortunately, Kobe Bryant was unable to play in this last series between the two teams due to his torn Achilles tendon suffered in a season win against the Golden State Warriors. Without their star player, the Lakers were swept by the Spurs 4–0. When the Miami Heat faced against the Spurs in the 2013 NBA Finals, a lot of Laker fans went for the Heat, who would eventually defeat them four games to three in the NBA Finals. In 2014, the Spurs and Heat met in the NBA Finals again, with the dominant Spurs beating the Heat in 5 games. As a result of the 2014 victory, Tim Duncan now had as many championships as Kobe Bryant.

On Saturday February 5, Kobe Bryant and the Los Angeles Lakers went to San Antonio, Texas to play the San Antonio Spurs for Bryant's final game there. The Spurs honored Kobe Bryant with a 2½ minute video while the spotlight shone on Kobe, seated on the Lakers bench. The video showed highlight plays of Bryant, and interviews with Coach Greg Popovich, Tim Duncan, Tony Parker and Manu Ginobili, the Spurs players who have faced Kobe during his entire career. The Spurs won the game 106–102 and Kobe finished the game with 25 points and converted just 9 of his 28 shots. 2016 was also Tim Duncan's last season. In total, Bryant played 20 season, all with the Lakers, while Duncan played 19, all with the Spurs.

=== 0.4 seconds shot (2004) ===
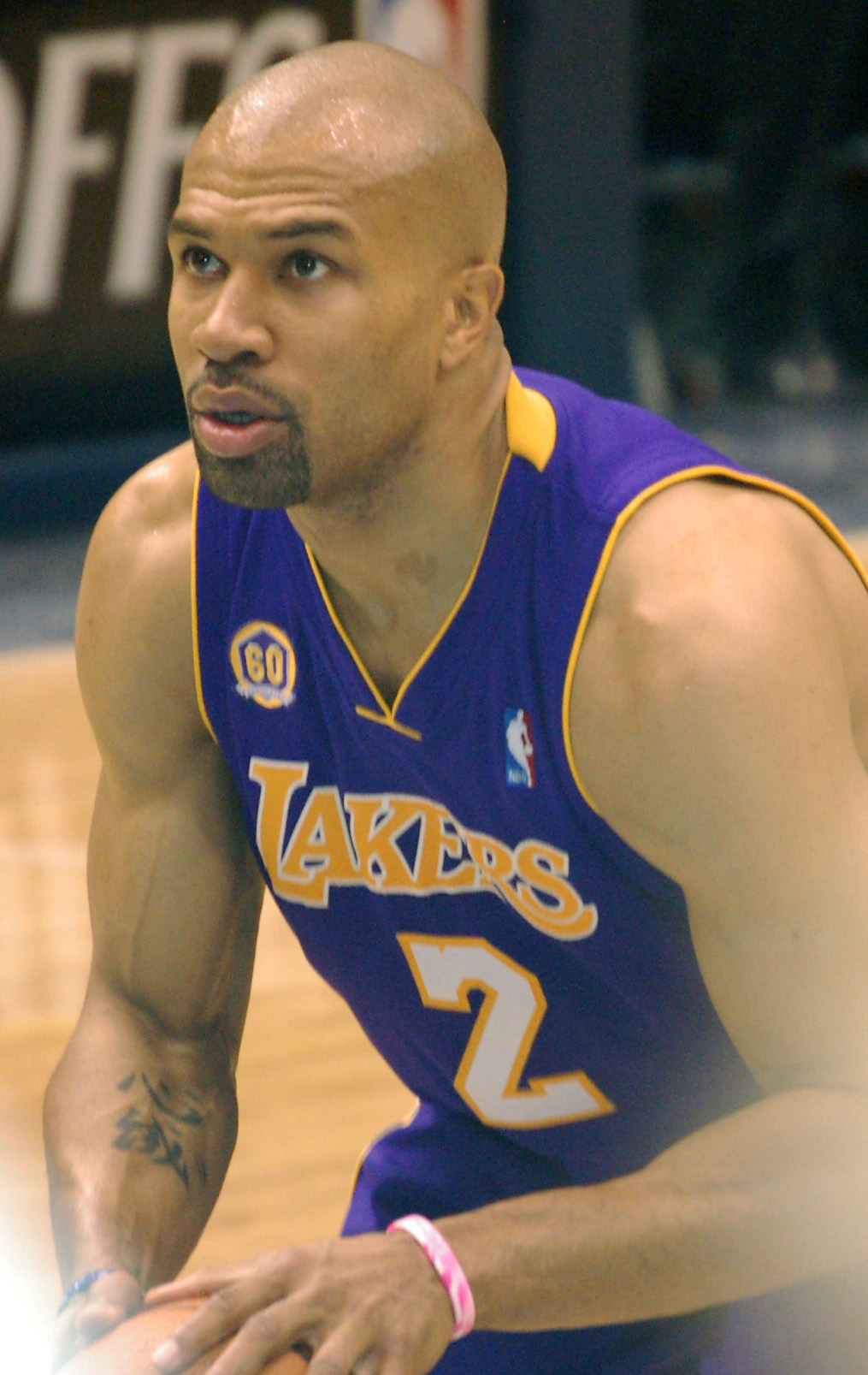
Derek Fisher (pictured in 2008) hit the game-winning jumper with 0.4 seconds left in Game 5 of the 2004 Western Conference Semifinals

In 2004, the teams met again in the Western Conference Semifinals. After the home team won the first 4 games to set the series at 2, the Lakers beat San Antonio on the road in a memorable Game 5. With the Spurs down 72–71 with 5.4 seconds left, Duncan was almost perfectly defended by Shaq and still made an off-balance fadeaway 20-footer to take a 73–72 lead with 0.4 seconds left. After a few timeouts, Derek Fisher received the inbounds pass from Gary Payton and hit a turn-around 18-footer while falling away. Instant replay showed the ball left Fisher's hands with 0.1 seconds left, thus the Lakers escaped with a 74–73 victory. The NBA denied a Spurs protest stating that the clock did not start in time. The Lakers went on to win the series, and advance to the NBA Finals where they lost to the Detroit Pistons.

=== 2017–present ===
The rivalry flared once more with the arrival of LeBron James and Anthony Davis to the Lakers and DeMar DeRozan to the Spurs, a former Raptors player that was swept by the Cleveland Cavaliers in the 2017–18 playoffs. James, as a member of the Cleveland Cavaliers and the Miami Heat, has met the Spurs in the NBA Finals on three occasions, losing in 2007 and 2014 and winning in 2013. In 2019–20 NBA season, the Spurs missed the playoffs for the first time in 23 years, while the Lakers clinched the Playoffs and won the title that season. In 2023, the Spurs drafted Victor Wembanyama first overall, eventually forming a young core around him. In 2024, they also acquired free agent Chris Paul, whose trade to the Lakers was vetoed by the late Commissioner David Stern in 2011.

The Lakers and Spurs faced off in the group stage of the 2024 NBA Cup under West Group B, where the Lakers won the game with a score of 120–115. This game secured the head-to-head tiebreaker for the Lakers to place third and the Spurs fourth in the group (won by the Oklahoma City Thunder to advance to the knockout stage), despite the Spurs having a higher point differential. Later that season, in February 2025, the Lakers acquired Luka Dončić from the Dallas Mavericks through a three-team trade involving Anthony Davis.

The two teams met again in the 2025 NBA Cup knockout round quarterfinals as a result of their respective group wins. The Lakers hosted this game due to higher point differential, resulting in three home games for Los Angeles and only one for San Antonio in the season series. The Spurs won the game 132–119, advancing to the semifinals to be held at the T-Mobile Arena near Las Vegas. Later that season, Wembanyama scored 40 points in just 26 minutes in a road win against a depleted Lakers team.

Both teams are also slated to face each other in West Group C of the 2026 NBA Cup.

== Season-by-season results ==
Los Angeles Lakers vs. San Antonio Spurs Season-by-Season Results
1970s (Lakers, 9–5)

Season	Season series		at Los Angeles Lakers	at San Antonio Spurs	Overall series	Notes
1976–77	Lakers	3–1	Lakers, 2–0	Tie, 1–1	Lakers; 3–1	As part of the merger with the American Basketball Association (ABA), the San Antonio Spurs join the NBA and are placed in the Eastern Conference and the Central Division. Lakers finish with the best record in the league (53–29).
1977–78	Tie	2–2	Lakers, 2–0	Spurs, 2–0	Lakers; 5–3	
1978–79	Tie	2–2	Lakers, 2–0	Spurs, 2–0	Lakers; 7–5	
1979–80	Lakers	2–0	Lakers, 121–119	Lakers, 127–121	Lakers; 9–5	Only season where the Lakers and Spurs faced each other for two games per season. Lakers win 1980 NBA Finals.

1980s (Lakers, 42–22)

Season	Season series		at Los Angeles Lakers	at San Antonio Spurs	Overall series	Notes
1980–81	Spurs	3–2	Lakers, 2–1	Spurs, 2–0	Lakers; 11–8	Spurs move to the Western Conference and the Midwest Division.
1981–82	Spurs	3–2	Tie, 1–1	Spurs, 2–1	Lakers; 13–11	
1982 Western Conference Finals	Lakers	4–0	Lakers, 2–0	Lakers, 2–0	Lakers; 17–11	1st postseason series. Lakers go on to win 1982 NBA Finals.
1982–83	Spurs	4–1	Spurs, 2–1	Spurs, 2–0	Lakers; 18–15	
1983 Western Conference Finals	Lakers	4–2	Spurs, 2–1	Lakers, 3–0	Lakers; 22–17	2nd postseason series. Lakers go on to lose 1983 NBA Finals.
1983–84	Spurs	3–2	Tie, 1–1	Spurs, 2–1	Lakers; 24–20	Lakers lose 1984 NBA Finals.
1984–85	Lakers	3–2	Lakers, 3–0	Spurs, 2–0	Lakers; 27–22	Lakers win 1985 NBA Finals.
1985–86	Lakers	4–1	Lakers, 2–0	Lakers, 2–1	Lakers; 31–23	
1986 Western Conference First Round	Lakers	3–0	Lakers, 2–0	Lakers, 1–0	Lakers; 34–23	3rd postseason series. In game 1, Lakers beat the Spurs 135–88, their largest victory against the Spurs with a 47-point differential.
1986–87	Lakers	4–1	Lakers, 3–0	Tie, 1–1	Lakers; 38–24	On March 20, 1987, Lakers beat the Spurs 147–115, their most points scored in a game against the Spurs. Lakers finish with the best record in the league (65–17). Lakers win 1987 NBA Finals.
1987–88	Lakers	5–0	Lakers, 2–0	Lakers, 3–0	Lakers; 43–24	On November 15, 1987, Lakers beat the Spurs 147–130, tying their most points scored in a game against the Spurs for a second consecutive year. Lakers sweep the season series over the Spurs for the first time. Lakers finish with the best record in the league (62–20).
1988 Western Conference First Round	Lakers	3–0	Lakers, 2–0	Lakers, 1–0	Lakers; 46–24	4th postseason series. Lakers go on to win 1988 NBA Finals.
1988–89	Lakers	3–1	Lakers, 2–0	Tie, 1–1	Lakers; 49–25	Lakers lose 1989 NBA Finals.
1989–90	Tie	2–2	Tie, 1–1	Tie, 1–1	Lakers; 51–27	Lakers win 18 home games in a row against the Spurs. Lakers finish with the best record in the league (63–19).

1990s (Spurs, 30–19)

Season	Season series		at Los Angeles Lakers	at San Antonio Spurs	Overall series	Notes
1990–91	Lakers	3–1	Lakers, 2–0	Tie, 1–1	Lakers; 54–28	Lakers lose 1991 NBA Finals.
1991–92	Spurs	3–1	Tie, 1–1	Spurs, 2–0	Lakers; 55–31	
1992–93	Tie	2–2	Spurs, 2–0	Lakers, 2–0	Lakers; 57–33	Spurs finish with a winning record at Los Angeles for the first time since the 1982 season. Road teams sweeps the season series for the first time. Last season Spurs played at HemisFair Arena.
1993–94	Spurs	4–0	Spurs, 2–0	Spurs, 2–0	Lakers; 57–37	Spurs open up Alamodome. Spurs sweep the season series over the Lakers for the first time.
1994–95	Spurs	3–1	Tie, 1–1	Spurs, 2–0	Lakers; 58–40	Spurs finish with the best record in the league (62–20).
1995 Western Conference Semifinals	Spurs	4–2	Spurs, 2–1	Spurs, 2–1	Lakers; 60–44	5th postseason series. Spurs win their first playoff series over the Lakers.
1995–96	Spurs	3–1	Tie, 1–1	Spurs, 2–0	Lakers; 61–47	
1996–97	Tie	2–2	Tie, 1–1	Tie, 1–1	Lakers; 63–49	Shaquille O'Neal signs with the Lakers. Kobe Bryant makes his debut for the Lakers.
1997–98	Lakers	4–0	Lakers, 2–0	Lakers, 2–0	Lakers; 67–49	Tim Duncan makes his debut for the Spurs.
1998–99	Lakers	2–1	Lakers, 1–0	Tie, 1–1	Lakers; 69–50	Last season Lakers played at Great Western Forum. Spurs finish with the best record in the league (37–13).
1999 Western Conference Semifinals	Spurs	4–0	Spurs, 2–0	Spurs, 2–0	Lakers; 69–54	6th postseason series. First series matchup between Tim Duncan and Shaquille O'Neal. Lakers play their final games at Great Western Forum. Spurs go on to win 1999 NBA Finals, their first NBA championship.
1999–2000	Spurs	3–1	Tie, 1–1	Spurs, 2–0	Lakers; 70–57	Phil Jackson becomes the head coach for the Lakers. Lakers open up Staples Center (now known as Crypto.com Arena). Following their loss to the Spurs on February 1, 2000, Lakers go on a 19–game winning streak, the second longest in franchise history. Lakers finish with the best record in the league (67–15). Lakers win 2000 NBA Finals.

2000s (Lakers, 35–29)

Season	Season series		at Los Angeles Lakers	at San Antonio Spurs	Overall series	Notes
2000–01	Tie	2–2	Tie, 1–1	Tie, 1–1	Lakers; 72–59	Spurs finish with the best record in the league (58–24).
2001 Western Conference Finals	Lakers	4–0	Lakers, 2–0	Lakers, 2–0	Lakers; 76–59	7th postseason series. Lakers go on to win 2001 NBA Finals.
2001–02	Lakers	3–1	Lakers, 2–0	Tie, 1–1	Lakers; 79–60	Last season Spurs played at Alamodome.
2002 Western Conference Semifinals	Lakers	4–1	Lakers, 2–1	Lakers, 2–0	Lakers; 83–61	8th postseason series. Spurs entered the fourth quarter with a lead in four of the five games, but they managed to secure victory in just one of those instances. Spurs play their final games at Alamodome. Lakers go on to win 2002 NBA Finals.
2002–03	Spurs	4–0	Spurs, 2–0	Spurs, 2–0	Lakers; 83–65	Spurs open up SBC Center (now known as Frost Bank Center). Spurs finish with the best record in the league (60–22).
2003 Western Conference Semifinals	Spurs	4–2	Lakers, 2–1	Spurs, 3–0	Lakers; 85–69	9th postseason series. Spurs go on to win 2003 NBA Finals.
2003–04	Lakers	3–1	Tie, 1–1	Lakers, 2–0	Lakers; 88–70	Last season Shaq played for the Lakers, as he would be traded to the Miami Heat the subsequent season.
2004 Western Conference Semifinals	Lakers	4–2	Lakers, 3–0	Spurs, 2–1	Lakers; 92–72	10th postseason series. In Game 5, Tim Duncan successfully executes a fadeaway jumper over Shaquille O'Neal, putting the Spurs ahead with just 0.4 seconds remaining. However, Derek Fisher responds with a buzzer-beater off the inbounds pass, securing the win for the Lakers. Lakers go on to lose 2004 NBA Finals.
2004–05	Spurs	4–0	Spurs, 2–0	Spurs, 2–0	Lakers; 92–76	Spurs move to the Southwest Division. Phil Jackson did not serve as the coach this season for the Lakers, but would be rehired the next season. Spurs win 2005 NBA Finals.
2005–06	Spurs	3–1	Spurs, 2–0	Tie, 1–1	Lakers; 93–79	
2006–07	Lakers	2–1	Tie, 1–1	Lakers, 1–0	Lakers; 95–80	Spurs win 2007 NBA Finals.
2007–08	Tie	2–2	Lakers, 2–0	Spurs, 2–0	Lakers; 97–82	
2008 Western Conference Finals	Lakers	4–1	Lakers, 3–0	Tie, 1–1	Lakers; 101–83	11th postseason series. Lakers record their 100th win over the Spurs. Lakers go on to lose 2008 NBA Finals.
2008–09	Lakers	2–1	Lakers, 1–0	Tie, 1–1	Lakers; 103–84	Lakers win 2009 NBA Finals.
2009–10	Tie	2–2	Tie, 1–1	Tie, 1–1	Lakers; 105–86	Lakers win 2010 NBA Finals.

2010s (Spurs, 25–14)

Season	Season series		at Los Angeles Lakers	at San Antonio Spurs	Overall series	Notes
2010–11	Tie	2–2	Tie, 1–1	Tie, 1–1	Lakers; 107–88	Final season Phil Jackson coached for the Lakers.
2011–12	Spurs	2–1	Spurs, 1–0	Tie, 1–1	Lakers; 108–90	
2012–13	Spurs	2–1	Tie, 1–1	Spurs, 1–0	Lakers; 109–92	
2013 Western Conference First Round	Spurs	4–0	Spurs, 2–0	Spurs, 2–0	Lakers; 109–96	12th postseason series. In game 3, Spurs beat the Lakers 120–89, the largest home playoff loss for the Lakers in franchise history with a 31-point differential. Spurs go on to lose 2013 NBA Finals.
2013–14	Spurs	3–1	Spurs, 2–0	Tie, 1–1	Lakers; 110–99	Spurs finish with the best record in the league (62–20). Spurs win 2014 NBA Finals.
2014–15	Spurs	2–1	Spurs, 1–0	Tie, 1–1	Lakers; 111–101	Spurs record their 100th win over the Lakers.
2015–16	Spurs	4–0	Spurs, 2–0	Spurs, 2–0	Lakers; 111–105	Final season for Tim Duncan and Kobe Bryant.
2016–17	Spurs	3–1	Spurs, 2–0	Tie, 1–1	Lakers; 112–108	On January 12, 2017, Spurs beat the Lakers 134–94, their largest victory against the Lakers with a 40-point differential. Spurs win 9 away games in a row against the Lakers.
2017–18	Lakers	3–0	Lakers, 2–0	Lakers, 1–0	Lakers; 115–108	Lakers finish with a winning record at San Antonio for the first time since the 2006 season.
2018–19	Spurs	3–1	Tie, 1–1	Spurs, 2–0	Lakers; 116–111	LeBron James signs with the Lakers. On October 22, 2018, Spurs beat the Lakers 143–142 in double overtime, their most points scored in a game against the Lakers.
2019–20	Lakers	3–0	Lakers, 1–0	Lakers, 2–0	Lakers; 119–111	Lakers win 2020 NBA Finals.

2020s (Lakers, 14–8)

Season	Season series		at Los Angeles Lakers	at San Antonio Spurs	Overall series	Notes
2020–21	Lakers	2–1	Spurs, 1–0	Lakers, 2–0	Lakers; 121–112	
2021–22	Tie	2–2	Tie, 1–1	Tie, 1–1	Lakers; 123–114	Lakers and Spurs miss the playoffs in the same season for the first time.
2022–23	Lakers	4–0	Lakers, 2–0	Lakers, 2–0	Lakers; 127–114	
2023–24	Lakers	2–1	Lakers, 1–0	Tie, 1–1	Lakers; 129–115	Victor Wembanyama makes his debut for the Spurs. With the win, Spurs end an 18-game losing streak, their longest in franchise history. Lakers win the inaugural 2023 NBA Cup.
2024–25	Lakers	3–1	Tie, 1–1	Lakers, 2–0	Lakers; 132–116	On November 15, 2024, at San Antonio, the Lakers beat the Spurs during the 2024 NBA Cup group stage. This game secured the tiebreaker for the Lakers to place higher in West Group B. First season for Luka Doncic as a Laker.
2025–26	Spurs	3–1	Spurs, 2–1	Spurs, 1–0	Lakers; 133–119	On December 10, 2025, at Los Angeles, the Spurs beat the Lakers 132–119 during the 2025 NBA Cup quarterfinals, eliminating the Lakers from the tournament. Spurs go on to lose the 2025 NBA Cup championship game. Spurs lose 2026 NBA Finals. Final season for LeBron James as a Laker.
2026–27	Tie	0-0	April 4th, 2027	November 27th, 2026 and February 6th, 2027	Lakers; 133–119	

Summary of Results

Season	Season series		at Los Angeles Lakers	at San Antonio Spurs	Notes
Regular season games	Lakers	99–97	Lakers, 56–41	Spurs, 56–43	
Postseason games	Lakers	34–22	Lakers, 20–10	Lakers, 14–12	
Postseason series	Lakers	8–4	Tie, 4–4	Lakers, 4–0	Western Conference First Round: 1986, 1988, 2013; Western Conference Semifinals: 1995, 1999, 2002, 2003, 2004; Western Conference Finals: 1982, 1983, 2001, 2008
Regular and postseason	Lakers	133–116	Lakers, 76–51	Spurs, 68–57	

== Individual Records ==
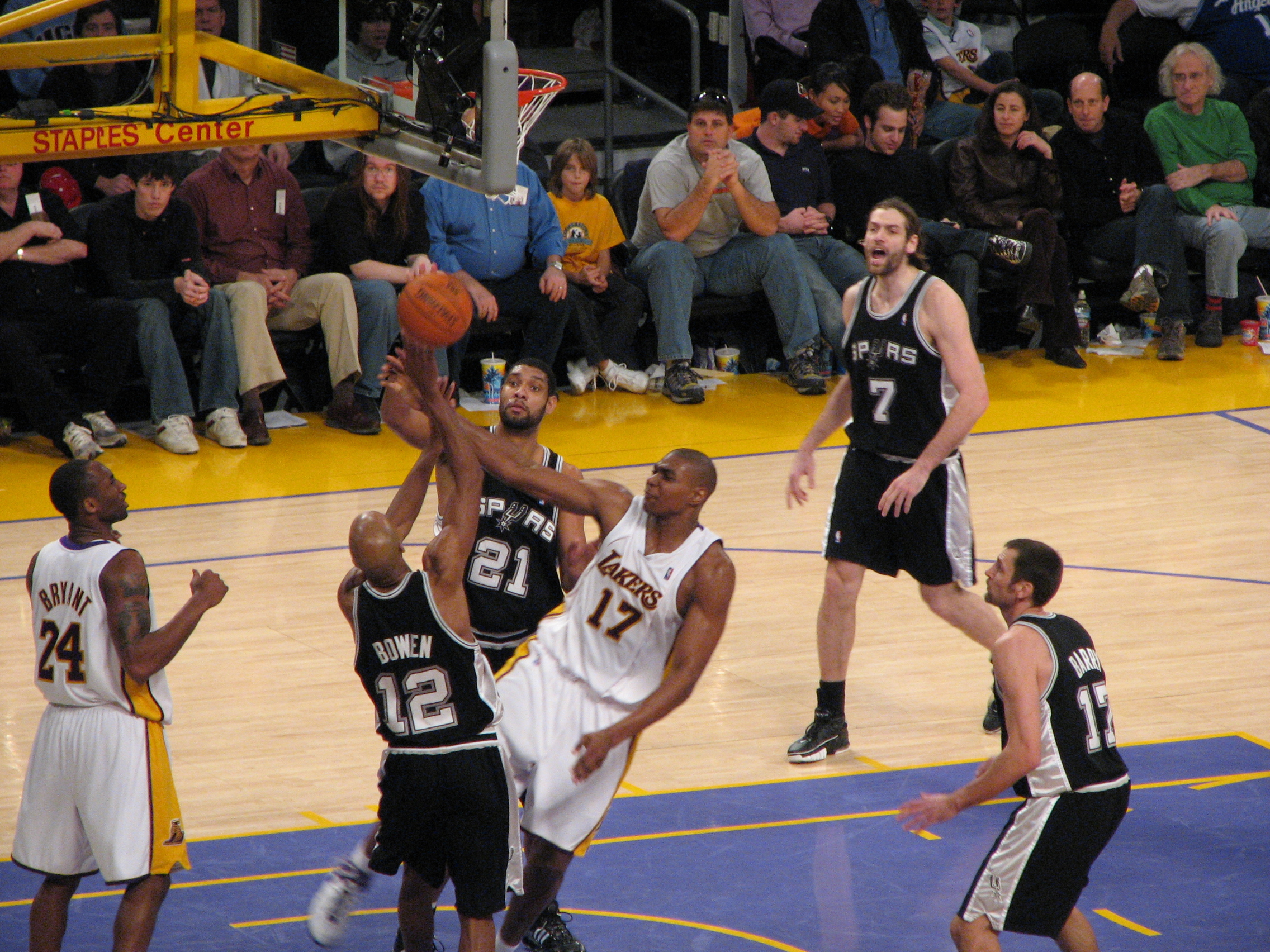
Kobe Bryant (24) has scored the most points in this rivalry, and Tim Duncan (21) has played the most games in this rivalry.

=== Top Scorers (Regular Season) ===
Note: Bold denotes active player, italics denotes active player for other teams.

Rank	Player	Team	Points	GP	PPG
1	Kobe Bryant	Lakers	1,437	61	23.6
2	Kareem Abdul-Jabbar	Lakers	1,225	55	22.3
3	Tim Duncan	Spurs	1,129	62	18.2
4	Magic Johnson	Lakers	963	50	19.3
5	David Robinson	Spurs	961	47	20.4
6	James Worthy	Lakers	909	50	18.2
7	Tony Parker	Spurs	878	54	16.3
8	George Gervin	Spurs	871	35	24.9
9	Manu Ginóbili	Spurs	703	50	14.1
10	Byron Scott	Lakers	697	47	14.8

==== Per Game (Regular Season, min. 10 GP) ====
1. LeBron James (LAL) – **27.9** (19 GP)
2. Anthony Davis (LAL) – **27.4** (16 GP)
3. DeMar DeRozan (SAS) – **26.1** (10 GP)
4. Shaquille O'Neal (LAL) – **25.1** (25 GP)
5. George Gervin (SAS) – **24.9** (35 GP)

=== Top Scorers (NBA Playoffs) ===
Rank	Player	Team	Points	GP	PPG
1	Kobe Bryant	Lakers	847	30	28.2
2	Tim Duncan	Spurs	827	34	24.3
3	Shaquille O'Neal	Lakers	597	25	23.9
4	Tony Parker	Spurs	444	26	17.1
5	Kareem Abdul-Jabbar	Lakers	356	16	22.3
6	David Robinson	Spurs	343	23	14.9

==== Per Game (Playoffs, min. 4 GP) ====
1. Kobe Bryant (LAL) – **28.2** (30 GP)
2. George Gervin (SAS) – **26.5** (10 GP)
3. Tim Duncan (SAS) – **24.3** (24 GP)
4. Shaquille O'Neal (LAL) – **23.9** (25 GP)
5. Norm Nixon (LAL) – **23.0** (10 GP)

== See also ==
- National Basketball Association rivalries
- California–Texas rivalry
