= Cowboys–Rams rivalry =

National Football League rivalry

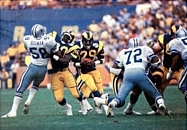
- Cowboys and Rams playing in the 1985 divisional playoffs

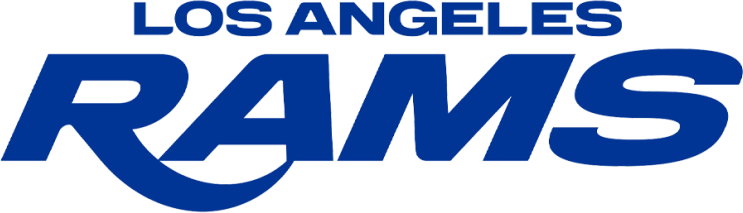
- Dallas Cowboys Los Angeles Rams
- Location: Dallas, Los Angeles
- First meeting: November 6, 1960; Rams 38, Cowboys 6
- Latest meeting: October 29, 2023; Cowboys 43, Rams 20
- Next meeting: December 20, 2026
- Stadiums: Cowboys: AT&T Stadium; Rams: SoFi Stadium

Statistics
- Total meetings: 38
- All-time series: Cowboys: 20–18
- Regular season series: Cowboys: 16–13
- Postseason results: Rams: 5–4
- Largest victory: Cowboys: 37–7 (1975); Rams: 38–13 (1960)
- Most points scored: Cowboys: 44 (2019); Rams: 38 (1960), (1980)
- Longest win streak: Cowboys: 3 (1973–1975, 2011–2014); Rams: 2 (1967–1969, 1976–1978, 1979–1980, 1985–1986, 2017–2018)
- Current win streak: Cowboys: 2 (2022–present)

Post–season history
- 1973 NFC Divisional: Cowboys won: 27–16; 1975 NFC Championship: Cowboys won: 37–7; 1976 NFC Divisional: Rams won: 14–12; 1978 NFC Championship: Cowboys won: 28–0; 1979 NFC Divisional: Rams won: 21–19; 1980 NFC Wild Card: Cowboys won: 34–13; 1983 NFC Wild Card: Rams won: 24–17; 1985 NFC Divisional: Rams won: 20–0; 2018 NFC Divisional: Rams won: 30–22

The Cowboys–Rams rivalry is a National Football League (NFL) rivalry between the Dallas Cowboys and the Los Angeles Rams.

As the Cowboys play in the NFC East and the Rams in the NFC West, both teams do not play every year; instead, they play at least once every three years and at least once every six seasons at each team's home stadium due to the NFL's rotating division schedules during which their respective divisions are paired up, sometimes more often if the two teams meet in the playoffs, or have a common position finish in their respective divisions. The rivalry between the two teams peaked during the 1970s and early-to-mid 1980s, during which they met eight times in the playoffs, with each team winning four.

The Cowboys lead the overall series, 20–18. The two teams have met nine times in the playoffs, with the Rams holding a 5–4 lead.

== History ==
The rivalry between the Cowboys and Rams started once Dallas joined the NFL as an expansion team in 1960. They were one of the first two teams to conduct joint practices during the preseason. Initially, the rivalry became a friendly one owing to the friendship between Rams owner Dan Reeves and Cowboys executive Tex Schramm. However, the feud intensified after Schramm accused Rams head coach George Allen of sending a spy to a Cowboys practice, to which Allen countered by arguing that the Cowboys put a scout atop a tree to spy on the Rams.

The Cowboys and Rams faced each other in the playoffs for the first time in 1973. Dallas was coached by Tom Landry, and featured Roger Staubach as the quarterback and the Doomsday Defense led by Hall of Famer Bob Lilly. The Rams, coached by Chuck Knox, featured defensive stalwarts in Jack Youngblood and Merlin Olsen. In that first meeting, the Cowboys prevailed 27–16 at Texas Stadium in the NFC Divisional Round. Two seasons later, the two teams met in the NFC championship game at the Los Angeles Memorial Coliseum. Despite entering the game as heavy favorites, the Rams lost in a blowout at home, 37–7, sending the Cowboys to their third Super Bowl appearance. However, the Rams returned the favor in the 1976 divisional round, winning a close 14–12 decision in Dallas. It was also the Rams' first road playoff victory.

As was the case in 1975, the 1978 NFC championship game resulted in a blowout victory for the Cowboys on the road, winning 28–0 and clinched the team's fifth Super Bowl appearance. The Cowboys lost both of those games to the Pittsburgh Steelers. But in a similar fashion to 1976, the Rams bounced back in a chippy low-scoring encounter, winning the 1979 divisional round 21–19 in Dallas. In that game, Rams quarterback Vince Ferragamo threw three touchdown passes, the last of which gave the Rams the lead for good. This game was also notable as it marked the final game of Roger Staubach's career. The Rams eventually advance to their first Super Bowl, but lost to the Steelers. The two teams met in the playoffs for a third consecutive time, this time in the 1980 Wild Card round. In that game, the Cowboys routed the Rams at home, winning 34–13.

The 1980s saw a Cowboys team in transition, now featuring Danny White as its starting quarterback. Meanwhile, the Rams drafted running back Eric Dickerson in the 1983 NFL draft and quickly became the face of the franchise. The next two playoff meetings resulted in Rams victories. In the 1983 Wild Card round, the Rams stunned the heavily favored Cowboys 24–17 in Dallas, with White committing three interceptions. Then in the 1985 divisional round, Dickerson rushed for a playoff record 248 yards and two touchdowns as the Rams shut out the Cowboys 20–0 in Anaheim Stadium. The game marked Tom Landry's final playoff game as Cowboys head coach, as well as the final NFL playoff game in Anaheim (the Rams moved there in 1980).

The rivalry became dormant over the next two decades. While the Cowboys became a Super Bowl dynasty in the 1990s and remained a relevant franchise in subsequent years, the Rams struggled with nine consecutive losing seasons, during which the team relocated to St. Louis in 1995. The Rams eventually won Super Bowl XXXIV in 1999 behind The Greatest Show on Turf trio of Kurt Warner, Marshall Faulk, and Isaac Bruce, but it also coincided with the decline of the Cowboys' Super Bowl-winning core featuring Troy Aikman, Michael Irvin and Emmitt Smith. In 2002, the Cowboys met the Rams for the first time since the latter's move to St. Louis; it was also their first meeting overall since 1992, a 27–23 Rams win on the road. In Dallas' first visit to Edward Jones Dome, the Cowboys prevailed 13–10. The Cowboys made two more visits to St. Louis in 2008 and 2014, splitting those meetings.

After the 2015 season, the Rams returned to Los Angeles, and gradually reemerged as a Super Bowl contender. In 2018, the Rams and Cowboys met in the playoffs for the first time since 1985. In the divisional round, the Rams prevailed 30–22 and went on to play in Super Bowl LIII in a losing cause to the New England Patriots. The game marked the Cowboys' final visit to the Los Angeles Memorial Coliseum. The 2020 season saw the Rams move to SoFi Stadium, and on September 13, the stadium hosted its first-ever game with the Cowboys as the visiting team. The Rams won 20–17.

== Season-by-season results ==
Dallas Cowboys vs. St. Louis/Los Angeles Rams Season-by-Season Results
1960s (Rams, 3–1)

Season	Results	Location	Overall series	Notes
1960	Rams; 38–13	Cotton Bowl	Rams; 1–0	Cowboys join the National Football League (NFL) as an expansion team. This loss was the Cowboys' seventh of ten straight losses to start the season.
1962	Cowboys; 27–17	Los Angeles Memorial Coliseum	Tied; 1–1	
1967	Rams; 35–13	Cotton Bowl	Rams; 2–1	As a result of expansion, the two eight-team divisions became two eight-team conferences split into two divisions, with the Cowboys placed in the NFL Capitol and the Rams placed in the NFL Coastal. The first meeting in the series for George Allen as Rams head coach. Final meeting at Cotton Bowl. Cowboys lose 1967 NFL Championship.
1969	Rams; 24–23	Los Angeles Memorial Coliseum	Rams; 3–1	Final meeting in the series for George Allen as Rams head coach.

1970s (Cowboys, 6–4)

Season	Results	Location	Overall series	Notes
1971	Cowboys; 28–21	Texas Stadium	Rams; 3–2	As a result of the AFL–NFL merger from the previous season, the Cowboys were placed in the NFC East and the Rams were placed in the NFC West. Game was played on Thanksgiving. First meeting at Texas Stadium. First start in the series for Roger Staubach. Cowboys win Super Bowl VI.
1973	Rams; 37–31	Los Angeles Memorial Coliseum	Rams; 4–2	First meeting in the series for Chuck Knox as Rams head coach.
1973 playoffs	Cowboys 27–16	Texas Stadium	Rams 4–3	NFC Divisional Round. The first post-season meeting between the teams.
1975	Cowboys; 18–7	Texas Stadium	Tied; 4–4	
1975 playoffs	Cowboys 37–7	Los Angeles Memorial Coliseum	Cowboys 5–4	NFC Championship Game. Cowboys take the first lead in the series. Cowboys lose Super Bowl X.
1976 playoffs	Rams 14–12	Texas Stadium	Tied 5–5	NFC Divisional Round.
1978	Rams; 27–14	Los Angeles Memorial Coliseum	Rams; 6–5	
1978 playoffs	Cowboys 28–0	Los Angeles Memorial Coliseum	Tied 6–6	NFC Championship Game. Final meeting at Los Angeles Memorial Coliseum until the 2018 season. Cowboys lose Super Bowl XIII.
1979	Cowboys; 30–6	Texas Stadium	Cowboys; 7–6	
1979 playoffs	Rams 21–19	Texas Stadium	Tied 7–7	NFC Divisional Round. Final start in the series for Cowboys' QB Roger Staubach. After their home loss to the Rams, the Cowboys went on an 18-game home winning streak. Rams lose Super Bowl XIV.

1980s (Rams, 5–4)

Season	Results	Location	Overall series	Notes
1980	Rams; 38–14	Anaheim Stadium	Rams; 8–7	First meeting at Anaheim Stadium.
1980 playoffs	Cowboys 34–13	Texas Stadium	Tied 8–8	NFC Wild Card Round.
1981	Cowboys; 29–17	Texas Stadium	Cowboys; 9–8	
1983 playoffs	Rams 24–17	Texas Stadium	Tied 9–9	NFC Wild Card Round.
1984	Cowboys; 20–13	Anaheim Stadium	Cowboys; 10–9	
1985 playoffs	Rams 20–0	Anaheim Stadium	Tied 10–10	NFC Divisional Round. Final playoff game for Cowboys head coach Tom Landry.
1986	Rams; 29–10	Anaheim Stadium	Rams; 11–10	Tom Landry was escorted off the field in the 3rd quarter following the Anaheim Police Department learning of a threat on Landry's life; with Landry later returning after being fitted for a bulletproof vest.
1987	Cowboys; 29–21	Anaheim Stadium	Tied; 11–11	Final meeting in the series for Tom Landry as Cowboys head coach.
1989	Rams; 35–31	Texas Stadium	Rams; 12–11	First start in the series for Cowboys QB Troy Aikman and first appearance for Jimmy Johnson as Cowboys head coach.

1990s (Tied, 1–1)

Season	Results	Location	Overall series	Notes
1990	Cowboys; 24–21	Anaheim Stadium	Tied; 12–12	Final meeting at Anaheim Stadium. The final meeting in Los Angeles until the 2018 season.
1992	Rams; 27–23	Texas Stadium	Rams; 13–12	Final meeting until the 2017 season the Cowboys faced the Rams as a Los Angeles-based team, as the team relocated to St. Louis in the 1995 season. Final start in the series for Cowboys' QB Troy Aikman and Cowboys' HC Jimmy Johnson. Rams' win is the Cowboys' only home loss in the 1992 season. Cowboys win Super Bowl XXVII.

2000s (Tied, 2–2)

Season	Results	Location	Overall series	Notes
2002	Cowboys; 13–10	Edward Jones Dome	Tied; 13–13	First meeting in St. Louis.
2005	Rams; 20–10	Texas Stadium	Rams; 14–13	
2007	Cowboys; 35–7	Texas Stadium	Tied; 14–14	Final meeting at Texas Stadium.
2008	Rams; 34–14	Edward Jones Dome	Rams; 15–14	Rams' win would be their last win of the season, as they ended the season on a 10-game losing streak.

2010s (Cowboys, 4–2)

Season	Results	Location	Overall series	Notes
2011	Cowboys; 34–7	AT&T Stadium	Tied; 15–15	First meeting at AT&T Stadium.
2013	Cowboys; 31–7	AT&T Stadium	Cowboys; 16–15	
2014	Cowboys; 34–31	Edward Jones Dome	Cowboys; 17–15	Final meeting in St. Louis, as the Rams relocated back to Los Angeles in the 2016 season.
2017	Rams; 35–30	AT&T Stadium	Cowboys; 17–16	
2018 playoffs	Rams 30–22	Los Angeles Memorial Coliseum	Tied 17–17	NFC Divisional Round. The first meeting in Los Angeles since the Rams returned to the city and the first postseason meeting in the 21st century. Final meeting at Los Angeles Memorial Coliseum. Rams lose Super Bowl LIII.
2019	Cowboys; 44–21	AT&T Stadium	Cowboys; 18–17	

2020s (Cowboys, 2–1)

Season	Results	Location	Overall series	Notes
2020	Rams; 20–17	SoFi Stadium	Tied; 18–18	First meeting at SoFi Stadium.
2022	Cowboys; 22–10	SoFi Stadium	Cowboys; 19–18	
2023	Cowboys; 43–20	AT&T Stadium	Cowboys; 20–18	
2026	December 20	SoFi Stadium	Cowboys; 20–18	

Summary of results

Season	Season series	at Dallas Cowboys	at Los Angeles/St. Louis Rams	Notes
Regular season	Cowboys 16–13	Cowboys 9–6	Tie 7–7	
Postseason	Rams 5–4	Rams 3–2	Tie 2–2	NFC Wild Card: 1980, 1983; NFC Divisional: 1973, 1976, 1979, 1985, 2018; NFC Championship: 1975, 1978
Regular and postseason	Cowboys 20–18	Cowboys 11–9	Tie 9–9	Cowboys have a 2–1 record in St. Louis. Rams currently have a 8–7 record in Los Angeles.

== See also ==
- National Football League rivalries
- California–Texas rivalry
- Angels–Rangers rivalry
