= 49ers–Cowboys rivalry =

National Football League rivalry

- San Francisco 49ers Dallas Cowboys
- Location: San Francisco, Dallas
- First meeting: November 20, 1960; 49ers 26, Cowboys 14
- Latest meeting: November 15, 2026; 49ers 46, Cowboys 40
- Next meeting: TBD
- Stadiums: 49ers: Levi's Stadium; Cowboys: AT&T Stadium

Statistics
- Total meetings: 41
- All-time series: 49ers: 22–19–1
- Regular season series: 49ers: 18–14–1
- Postseason results: Cowboys: 5–4
- Largest victory: 49ers: 42–10 (2023); Cowboys: 59–14 (1980)
- Most points scored: 49ers: 46 (2026); Cowboys: 59 (1980)
- Longest win streak: 49ers: 6 (1981–1990); Cowboys: 5 (1972–1980)
- Current win streak: 49ers: 5 (2022–present)

Post–season history
- 1970 NFC Championship: Cowboys won: 17–10; 1971 NFC Championship: Cowboys won: 14–3; 1972 NFC Divisional: Cowboys won: 30–28; 1981 NFC Championship: 49ers won: 28–27; 1992 NFC Championship: Cowboys won: 30–20; 1993 NFC Championship: Cowboys won: 38–21; 1994 NFC Championship: 49ers won: 38–28; 2021 NFC Wild Card: 49ers won: 23–17; 2022 NFC Divisional: 49ers won: 19–12

The 49ers–Cowboys rivalry is a National Football League (NFL) rivalry between the San Francisco 49ers and Dallas Cowboys.

As the Cowboys play in NFC East and the 49ers in the NFC West, they do not play every year; instead, they play at least once every three years and at least once every six seasons at each team's home stadium due to the NFL's rotating division schedules when their respective divisions are paired up. Additionally, not only both teams could meet in the playoffs, but also if they finish in the same place in their respective divisions, they would play the ensuing season.

It is one of the greatest inter-division rivalries in the NFL. Sports Illustrated ranked it as the eighth best rivalry while the NFL Top 10 ranked this rivalry to be the tenth best in the NFL. In 2020, CBS ranked it as the No. 1 NFL rivalry of the 1990s. The rivalry was also the subject of two 2015 episodes of NFL Network's The Timeline entitled "A Tale of Two Cities" with actors Sam Elliott (Cowboys) and Jeremy Renner (49ers) as narrators.

The 49ers lead the overall series, 22–19–1. The two teams have met nine times in the playoffs, with the Cowboys holding a 5–4 record.

== History ==
The Cowboys and 49ers have faced each other in the postseason nine times, the second most between any two NFL teams (behind only the 49ers–Packers rivalry; those two teams have met ten times). The rivalry between the Cowboys and 49ers started gaining traction in the 1970s. The Cowboys defeated the 49ers in the 1970 and 1971 NFC Championship games, and again in the 1972 Divisional playoff game. The 1981 NFC Championship game in San Francisco, which saw the 49ers' Joe Montana complete a game-winning pass to Dwight Clark in the final minute (now known as The Catch) is one of the most famous games in NFL history.

The rivalry became even more intense from 1992 to 1994 when the two teams faced each other in the NFC Championship game during all three seasons. Dallas won the first two match-ups while San Francisco won the third, and in each of these pivotal match-ups, the game's victor went on to win the Super Bowl. With the Cowboys winning the Super Bowl following the 1995 season, from 1992 to 1995, either the Cowboys or the 49ers were Super Bowl champions, giving both teams five each – which, at the time, was tied for the most by any NFL team and later NFC team (currently, both teams are tied for third behind the Pittsburgh Steelers and the New England Patriots with six each).

The rivalry went cold for many years due to the two teams’ inability to make the postseason in the same year after 1998 and until 2021, when both teams made the playoffs and were matched against each other in the Wild Card round in Dallas. The 49ers won that game 23–17. The two teams would meet each other in the 2022 playoff divisional round, which saw the 49ers take a 19–12 win. Both teams qualified for the 2023 postseason. However, the teams' fellow rival, the Green Bay Packers, defeated the Cowboys, becoming the first 7 seed to win a playoff game against the 2 seed. The loss not only prevented a third straight matchup with the 49ers, but also allowed the Packers and 49ers to play in a record 10th playoff game.

Players who have won championships with both teams include defensive end Charles Haley, linebacker Ken Norton Jr., and cornerback Deion Sanders.

As of the 2026 season, the 49ers are one of two NFC teams that the Cowboys have a losing record against, along with the Green Bay Packers. San Francisco's 46–40 win over the Cowboys that season marked the highest scoring game in the rivalry’s history.

== Season-by-season results ==
San Francisco 49ers vs. Dallas Cowboys Season-by-Season Results
1960s (49ers, 3–1–1)

Season	Results	Location	Overall series	Notes
1960	49ers 26–14	Cotton Bowl	49ers 1–0	Cowboys join the NFL as an expansion team. They are placed in the Western Conference but are moved to the Eastern Conference the following season.
1963	49ers 31–24	Kezar Stadium	49ers 2–0	
1965	Cowboys; 39–31	Cotton Bowl	49ers 2–1	
1967	49ers 24–16	Kezar Stadium	49ers 3–1	
1969	Tie; 24–24	Cotton Bowl	49ers 3–1–1	Game was played on Thanksgiving Day. Former Cowboys defensive back and assistant coach Dick Nolan makes his debut as 49ers head coach, as he was hired 1968 season.

1970s (Cowboys, 6–1)

Season	Results	Location	Overall series	Notes
1970 playoffs	Cowboys 17–10	Kezar Stadium	49ers 3–2–1	NFC Championship Game. First postseason meeting in the series. Last meeting in Kezar Stadium. Cowboys lose Super Bowl V.
1971 playoffs	Cowboys 14–3	Texas Stadium	Tie 3–3–1	Second straight NFC Championship Game meeting. First start in series for Roger Staubach. First meeting in Texas Stadium. Cowboys win Super Bowl VI.
1972	49ers 31–10	Texas Stadium	49ers 4–3–1	Game played on Thanksgiving Day. Most recent Thanksgiving Day meeting between these two teams.
1972 playoffs	Cowboys 30–28	Candlestick Park	Tie 4–4–1	NFC Divisional playoffs. First meeting at Candlestick Park. With Roger Staubach (who had been injured for much of the season) coming off the bench to replace an ineffective Craig Morton; Cowboys overcome 21–3 deficit and a 28–13 deficit in the fourth quarter to win. Last 49ers post-season game until 1981.
1974	Cowboys; 20–14	Texas Stadium	Cowboys; 5–4–1	Cowboys take first lead in the series.
1977	Cowboys; 42–35	Candlestick Park	Cowboys; 6–4–1	First ever Monday Night Football matchup between the two teams; Cowboys win Super Bowl XII.
1979	Cowboys; 21–13	Candlestick Park	Cowboys; 7–4–1	Last start in the series for Roger Staubach.

1980s (49ers, 5–1)

Season	Results	Location	Overall series	Notes
1980	Cowboys; 59–14	Texas Stadium	Cowboys; 8–4–1	Cowboys record their largest victory over the 49ers with a 45–point differential and tied their franchise record for most points scored in a game.
1981	49ers 45–14	Candlestick Park	Cowboys; 8–5–1	First start in the series for 49ers' QB Joe Montana and 49ers' DE Fred Dean after Dean was acquired in a trade with the San Diego Chargers.
1981 playoffs	49ers 28–27	Candlestick Park	Cowboys 8–6–1	NFC Championship Game. First postseason win for the 49ers over the Cowboys. Wide receiver Dwight Clark makes a leaping catch in the back of the end zone on a pass from Joe Montana with 51 seconds left, best referred to as "The Catch". 49ers win Super Bowl XVI.
1983	49ers 42–17	Candlestick Park	Cowboys; 8–7–1	
1985	49ers 31–16	Candlestick Park	Tie; 8–8–1	The 49er victory allowed them to clinch the final NFC wild-card spot that season.
1989	49ers 31–14	Texas Stadium	49ers 9–8–1	49ers win Super Bowl XXIV. 49ers take first series lead since 1972.

1990s (49ers, 5–4)

Season	Results	Location	Overall series	Notes
1990	49ers 24–6	Texas Stadium	49ers 10–8–1	First start in series for Troy Aikman. Last start in series for Joe Montana.
1992 playoffs	Cowboys 30–20	Candlestick Park	49ers 10–9–1	NFC Championship Game. Cowboys win Super Bowl XXVII. After the game, Cowboys' head coach Jimmy Johnson was caught saying "How Bout Them Cowboys" in their postgame locker room.
1993	Cowboys; 26–17	Texas Stadium	Tie; 10–10–1	
1993 playoffs	Cowboys 38–21	Texas Stadium	Cowboys 11–10–1	Second straight NFC Championship Game meeting. Cowboys win Super Bowl XXVIII. Troy Aikman was knocked out of the game with a concussion after the knee of rookie 49er defensive tackle Dana Stubblefield struck his head.
1994	49ers 21–14	Candlestick Park	Tie; 11–11–1	
1994 playoffs	49ers 38–28	Candlestick Park	49ers 12–11–1	Third straight NFC Championship Game meeting. 49ers win Super Bowl XXIX.
1995	49ers 38–20	Texas Stadium	49ers 13–11–1	Cowboys win Super Bowl XXX.
1996	Cowboys; 20–17(OT)	3Com Park	49ers 13–12–1	First meeting between the two teams to go into overtime.
1997	49ers 17–10	3Com Park	49ers 14–12–1	Last start in the series for Steve Young.

2000s (Cowboys, 3–2)

Season	Results	Location	Overall series	Notes
2000	49ers 41–24	Texas Stadium	49ers 15–12–1	Last start in the series for Troy Aikman. This game was remembered for 49ers wide receiver (and future Cowboy) Terrell Owens spiking the ball on the Cowboys star at midfield following a touchdown and subsequently being hit by Cowboys safety George Teague.
2001	Cowboys; 27–21	Texas Stadium	49ers 15–13–1	
2002	49ers 31–27	Texas Stadium	49ers 16–13–1	
2005	Cowboys; 34–31	Monster Park	49ers 16–14–1	Cowboys overcame a 21–6 deficit.
2008	Cowboys; 35–22	Texas Stadium	49ers 16–15–1	Last meeting in Texas Stadium.

2010s (Cowboys, 3–1)

Season	Results	Location	Overall series	Notes
2011	Cowboys; 27–24 (OT)	Candlestick Park	Tie; 16–16–1	Last meeting in Candlestick Park.
2014	49ers 28–17	AT&T Stadium	49ers 17–16–1	First meeting at AT&T Stadium.
2016	Cowboys; 24–17	Levi's Stadium	Tie; 17–17–1	First meeting at Levi's Stadium.
2017	Cowboys; 40–10	Levi's Stadium	Cowboys; 18–17–1	Cowboys take first lead in the series since winning the 1993 NFC Championship Game.

2020s (49ers, 5–1)

Season	Results	Location	Overall series	Notes
2020	Cowboys; 41–33	AT&T Stadium	Cowboys; 19–17–1	Limited fans in attendance due to ongoing COVID-19 pandemic. 49ers were eliminated from postseason contention with this loss, coupled with a win by the Cardinals.
2021 playoffs	49ers 23–17	AT&T Stadium	Cowboys 19–18–1	NFC Wild Card playoffs. First playoff meeting since 1994.
2022 playoffs	49ers 19–12	Levi's Stadium	Tie 19–19–1	NFC Divisional playoffs. Ninth postseason meeting.
2023	49ers 42–10	Levi's Stadium	49ers 20–19–1	49ers record their largest victory over the Cowboys with a 32–point differential. 49ers lose Super Bowl LVIII.
2024	49ers 30–24	Levi's Stadium	49ers 21–19–1	
2026	49ers 46–40	AT&T Stadium	49ers 22–19–1	Highest scoring game in the history of the rivalry.

Summary of Results

Season	Season series	at San Francisco 49ers	at Dallas Cowboys	Notes
Regular season	49ers 18–14–1	49ers 9–7	49ers 9–7–1	
Postseason	Cowboys 5–4	Tie 3–3	Cowboys 2–1	NFC Wild Card: 2021; NFC Divisional: 1972, 2022; NFC Championship: 1970, 1971, 1981, 1992, 1993, 1994
Regular and postseason	49ers 22–19–1	49ers 12–10	49ers 10–9–1	

== See also ==
- List of NFL rivalries
- California–Texas rivalry
