= Angels–Rangers rivalry =

Major League Baseball rivalry

- Los Angeles Angels Texas Rangers
- First meeting: May 5, 1961; Wrigley Field, Los Angeles, California; Senators 6, Angels 2
- Latest meeting: August 23, 2026; Globe Life Field, Arlington, Texas; Rangers 5, Angels 3
- Next meeting: June 4, 2027; Angel Stadium, Anaheim, California
- Stadiums: Angels: Angel Stadium; Rangers: Globe Life Field

Statistics
- Total meetings: 1,032
- Most wins: Angels
- Regular season series: Angels, 526–506 (.510)
- Largest victory: Angels, 17–0 (August 23, 1963); Rangers, 20–3 (August 27, 2025)
- Longest win streak: Angels, 9 (October 5, 1985–September 26, 1986; June 20–August 16, 2014); Rangers, 8 (September 7, 2024–April 17, 2025)
- Current win streak: Rangers, 1

Locations of the Los Angeles Angels and Texas Rangers

The Angels–Rangers rivalry is a Major League Baseball (MLB) divisional rivalry played between the Los Angeles Angels and the Texas Rangers as both teams play in the American League West Division. The rivalry has been said to have developed over a domination in the division between the two teams, and also in recent years more animosity between the two teams due to multiple players who have played for both, including Nolan Ryan, Mike Napoli, Darren Oliver, Vladimir Guerrero, C. J. Wilson, and Josh Hamilton. Both teams often fought for control of the division, primarily during the 2000s and 2010s though both teams entered the 2020s fighting for relevance, with the Angels not having made the playoffs since 2014, and the Rangers missing from 2017 to 2022. The Angels and Rangers have each pitched a perfect game against each other, making them the only pair of MLB teams to have done so. Mike Witt pitched a perfect game for the Angels against the Rangers in 1984 at Arlington Stadium and Kenny Rogers for the Rangers against the Angels in 1994. Both teams have yet to face each other in the postseason, the Angels currently lead the series all time 526–506.

== History ==
When the original Washington Senators announced their move to Minnesota to become the Twins in 1961, Major League Baseball decided to expand a year earlier than planned to stave off the twin threats of competition from the proposed Continental League and loss of its exemption from the Sherman Antitrust Act. As part of the expansion, the American League added two expansion teams for the 1961 season–the Los Angeles Angels and a new Washington Senators team. The new Senators and Angels began competing to fill their rosters with American League players in an expansion draft. Following an apathetic fan response in Washington, owner Bob Short would relocate the Rangers to Arlington in 1972, while the Angels managed to move into a new ballpark in 1966. Both teams struggled mightily in their first 2 decades as expansion teams, though both would tie for second place in 1978. The Angels would not appear in the postseason until 1979, while the Rangers would not make a postseason appearance until 1996. Both teams were tied for second place of the division in 1998, however; the Angels would lose 2/4 games against the Athletics and find themselves swept by the Rangers for the final two games of the season, eliminating them from playoff contention. The Rangers would find themselves swept in both 1998 and 1999 by the Yankees, then fail to make a playoff appearance from 2000 to 2010, eventually making back-to-back appearances in both the 2010, and 2011 World Series. Meanwhile, the Angels managed a shocking appearance in the 2002 World Series, beating the San Francisco Giants and securing the franchise's first and only World Series title, though they would begin to struggle mightily under new owner Arte Moreno as the team found themselves losing three times to the Boston Red Sox in 2004, 2007, and 2008. Though the Angels would also manage an appearance in the 2009 ALCS, they would fall to the Yankees in six games. In 2012, then-Angels' pitcher C.J. Wilson played a practical joke on his former Rangers teammate Mike Napoli by tweeting his phone number. Enraged, Napoli began to exchange words with Wilson during the pregame warmups on May 19. The feuds go back to two incidents between Angels second baseman Adam Kennedy and Rangers catcher Gerald Laird trading insults, leading to benches clearing in a brawl between both teams. The Rangers managed two more appearances in the ALDS, but lost both times to the Toronto Blue Jays. The Angels have not posted a winning record or appeared in the postseason since they appeared in the 2014 ALDS in which they were swept by the Kansas City Royals, meanwhile the Rangers managed a return to the postseason in 2023 after seven years out of contention. In 2023, the Rangers won their first World Series, ending a 63-year drought total and 52 years in North Texas.

== Season-by-season results ==
Angels vs. Rangers Season-by-Season Results
1960s (Senators, 80–76)

Season	Season series		at Los Angeles/California Angels	at Washington Senators	Overall series	Notes
1961	Angels	10‍–‍8	Angels, 6‍–‍3	Senators, 5‍–‍4	Angels; 6‍–‍3	First season for Angels and this edition of Senators
1962	Angels	11‍–‍7	Angels, 5‍–‍4	Angels, 6‍–‍3	Angels; 21‍–‍15	Senators open District of Columbia Stadium
1963	Tie	9‍–‍9	Angels, 6‍–‍3	Senators, 6‍–‍3	Angels; 30‍–‍24	
1964	Angels	10‍–‍8	Angels, 6‍–‍3	Senators, 5‍–‍4	Angels; 40‍–‍32	
1965	Senators	12‍–‍6	Senators, 6‍–‍3	Senators, 6‍–‍3	Angels; 46‍–‍44	The Angels were renamed to "California Angels" with a month of the season remaining
1966	Senators	11‍–‍7	Angels, 5‍–‍4	Senators, 7‍–‍2	Senators; 55‍–‍53	Angels relocate to Anaheim and open Angel Stadium
1967	Senators	12‍–‍6	Senators, 5‍–‍4	Senators, 7‍–‍2	Senators; 67‍–‍59	
1968	Angels	12‍–‍6	Angels, 7‍–‍2	Angels, 5‍–‍4	Senators; 73‍–‍71	
1969	Senators	7‍–‍5	Tie, 3‍–‍3	Senators, 4‍–‍2	Senators; 80‍–‍76	

1970s (Senators/Rangers, 79–77)

Season	Season series		at California Angels	at Washington Senators/Texas Rangers	Overall series	Notes
1970	Angels	7‍–‍5	Tie, 3‍–‍3	Angels, 4‍–‍2	Senators; 85‍–‍83	
1971	Senators	8‍–‍4	Senators, 4‍–‍2	Senators, 4‍–‍2	Senators; 93‍–‍87	
1972	Angels	10‍–‍7	Angels, 6‍–‍2	Rangers, 5‍–‍4	Rangers; 100‍–‍97	Senators relocate to Arlington, Texas, and rebrand as the "Texas Rangers" and play at Arlington Stadium
1973	Angels	11‍–‍7	Angels, 7‍–‍2	Rangers, 5‍–‍4	Angels; 108‍–‍107	
1974	Tie	9‍–‍9	Angels, 5‍–‍4	Rangers, 5‍–‍4	Angels; 117‍–‍116	
1975	Tie	9‍–‍9	Angels, 5‍–‍4	Rangers, 5‍–‍4	Angels; 126‍–‍125	
1976	Angels	12‍–‍6	Angels, 6‍–‍3	Angels, 6‍–‍3	Angels; 138‍–‍131	
1977	Rangers	10‍–‍5	Tie, 4‍–‍4	Rangers, 6‍–‍1	Angels; 143‍–‍141	AL expansion reduces season series to 15 meetings per year
1978	Rangers	10‍–‍5	Angels, 4‍–‍3	Rangers, 7‍–‍1	Rangers; 151‍–‍148	
1979	Rangers	8‍–‍5	Angels, 4‍–‍3	Rangers, 5‍–‍1	Rangers; 159‍–‍153	

1980s (Angels, 68–55)

Season	Season series		at California Angels	at Texas Rangers	Overall series	Notes
1980	Angels	11‍–‍2	Angels, 5‍–‍1	Angels, 6‍–‍1	Angels; 164‍–‍161	
1981	Rangers	4‍–‍2	Rangers, 2‍–‍1	Rangers, 2‍–‍1	Angels; 166‍–‍165	Strike-shortened season
1982	Angels	8‍–‍5	Angels, 5‍–‍1	Rangers, 4‍–‍3	Angels; 174‍–‍170	
1983	Rangers	7‍–‍6	Rangers, 4‍–‍3	Tie, 3‍–‍3	Angels; 180‍–‍177	
1984	Rangers	8‍–‍5	Rangers, 5‍–‍1	Angels, 4‍–‍3	Tie; 185‍–‍185	Angels' Mike Witt pitches a perfect game against the Rangers
1985	Angels	9‍–‍4	Angels, 5‍–‍2	Angels, 4‍–‍2	Angels; 194‍–‍189	
1986	Angels	8‍–‍5	Angels, 4‍–‍2	Angels, 4‍–‍3	Angels; 202‍–‍194	
1987	Rangers	8‍–‍5	Rangers, 5‍–‍2	Tie, 3‍–‍3	Angels; 207‍–‍202	
1988	Angels	8‍–‍5	Angels, 4‍–‍2	Angels, 4‍–‍3	Angels; 215‍–‍207	
1989	Rangers	7‍–‍6	Angels, 4‍–‍3	Rangers, 4‍–‍2	Angels; 221‍–‍214	

1990s (Angels, 63–61)

Season	Season series		at California/Anaheim Angels	at Texas Rangers	Overall series	Notes
1990	Angels	8‍–‍5	Angels, 4‍–‍2	Angels, 4‍–‍3	Angels; 229‍–‍219	
1991	Rangers	8‍–‍5	Rangers, 4‍–‍3	Rangers, 4‍–‍2	Angels; 234‍–‍227	
1992	Angels	9‍–‍4	Angels, 4‍–‍2	Angels, 5‍–‍2	Angels; 243‍–‍231	
1993	Rangers	7‍–‍6	Angels, 4‍–‍3	Rangers, 4‍–‍2	Angels; 249‍–‍238	
1994	Angels	6‍–‍4	Angels, 2‍–‍1	Angels, 4‍–‍3	Angels; 255‍–‍242	Rangers open The Ballpark in Arlington. Rangers' Kenny Rogers' perfect game. Strike-shortened season. The strike cancelled the entire postseason.
1995	Rangers	7‍–‍6	Angels, 4‍–‍3	Rangers, 4‍–‍2	Angels; 261‍–‍249	
1996	Rangers	9‍–‍4	Rangers, 4‍–‍2	Rangers, 5‍–‍2	Angels; 265‍–‍258	
1997	Angels	8‍–‍4	Tie, 3‍–‍3	Angels, 5‍–‍1	Angels; 273‍–‍262	Angels renamed to "Anaheim Angels"
1998	Rangers	7‍–‍5	Rangers, 4‍–‍2	Tie, 3‍–‍3	Angels; 278‍–‍269	
1999	Tie	6‍–‍6	Tie, 3‍–‍3	Tie, 3‍–‍3	Angels; 284‍–‍275	

2000s (Angels, 100–83)

Season	Season series		at Anaheim Angels/ Los Angeles Angels of Anaheim	at Texas Rangers	Overall series	Notes
2000	Angels	7‍–‍5	Tie, 3‍–‍3	Angels, 4‍–‍2	Angels; 291‍–‍280	
2001	Rangers	12‍–‍7	Tie, 5‍–‍5	Rangers, 7‍–‍2	Angels; 298‍–‍292	MLB changed to an unbalanced schedule in 2001, resulting in 19–20 meetings per year
2002	Angels	12‍–‍7	Angels, 7‍–‍2	Tie, 5‍–‍5	Angels; 310‍–‍299	Angels win 2002 World Series
2003	Rangers	10‍–‍9	Angels, 6‍–‍4	Rangers, 6‍–‍3	Angels; 319‍–‍309	
2004	Rangers	10‍–‍9	Rangers, 5‍–‍4	Tie, 5‍–‍5	Angels; 328‍–‍319	
2005	Angels	15‍–‍4	Angels, 8‍–‍1	Angels, 7‍–‍3	Angels; 343‍–‍323	Angels rename to "Los Angeles Angels of Anaheim"
2006	Angels	11‍–‍8	Angels, 6‍–‍4	Angels, 5‍–‍4	Angels; 354‍–‍331	
2007	Angels	10‍–‍9	Angels, 6‍–‍3	Rangers, 6‍–‍4	Angels; 364‍–‍340	
2008	Angels	12‍–‍7	Tie, 5‍–‍5	Angels, 7‍–‍2	Angels; 376‍–‍347	
2009	Rangers	11‍–‍8	Tie, 5‍–‍5	Rangers, 6‍–‍3	Angels; 384‍–‍358	

2010s (Tie, 95–95)

Season	Season series		at Los Angeles Angels (of Anaheim)	at Texas Rangers	Overall series	Notes
2010	Rangers	10‍–‍9	Angels, 6‍–‍3	Rangers, 7‍–‍3	Angels; 393‍–‍368	Rangers lose 2010 World Series
2011	Rangers	12‍–‍7	Rangers, 7‍–‍3	Rangers, 5‍–‍4	Angels; 400‍–‍380	Rangers lose 2011 World Series
2012	Angels	10‍–‍9	Angels, 5‍–‍4	Tie, 5‍–‍5	Angels; 410‍–‍389	
2013	Rangers	15‍–‍4	Rangers, 6‍–‍3	Rangers, 9‍–‍1	Angels; 414‍–‍404	Both AL and NL have balanced teams, which leads to a balanced schedule of 19 games per season.
2014	Angels	14‍–‍5	Angels, 5‍–‍4	Angels, 9‍–‍1	Angels; 428‍–‍409	
2015	Angels	12‍–‍7	Angels, 5‍–‍4	Angels, 7‍–‍3	Angels; 440‍–‍416	
2016	Rangers	10‍–‍9	Angels, 6‍–‍4	Rangers, 6‍–‍3	Angels; 449‍–‍426	Angels' name reverts back to "Los Angeles Angels."
2017	Rangers	11‍–‍8	Rangers, 6‍–‍4	Rangers, 5‍–‍4	Angels; 457‍–‍437	
2018	Angels	13‍–‍6	Angels, 7‍–‍2	Angels, 6‍–‍4	Angels; 470‍–‍443	
2019	Rangers	10‍–‍9	Angels, 6‍–‍3	Rangers, 7‍–‍3	Angels; 479‍–‍453	

2020s (Rangers, 53–47)

Season	Season series		at Los Angeles Angels	at Texas Rangers	Overall series	Notes
2020	Rangers	6‍–‍4	Angels, 3‍–‍1	Rangers, 5‍–‍1	Angels; 483‍–‍459	Season shortened to 60 games (with 10 meetings) due to COVID-19 pandemic. Rangers open Globe Life Field
2021	Angels	11‍–‍8	Angels, 5‍–‍4	Angels, 6‍–‍4	Angels; 494‍–‍467	
2022	Rangers	10‍–‍9	Angels, 5‍–‍4	Rangers, 6‍–‍4	Angels; 503‍–‍477	
2023	Rangers	7‍–‍6	Rangers, 4‍–‍2	Angels, 4‍–‍3	Angels; 509‍–‍484	The schedule structure was modified starting this season to allow every team to play one series against every interleague team. Shortening meetings from 19 to 13 games Rangers win 2023 World Series
2024	Rangers	9‍–‍4	Rangers, 5‍–‍1	Rangers, 4‍–‍3	Angels; 513‍–‍493	
2025	Rangers	8‍–‍5	Angels, 4‍–‍3	Rangers, 5‍–‍1	Angels; 518‍–‍501	
2026	Angels	8‍–‍5	Angels, 6‍–‍1	Rangers, 4‍–‍2	Angels; 526‍–‍506	

Summary of Results

Season	Season series		at Los Angeles Angels	at Texas Rangers	Notes
Los Angeles Angels vs Washington Senators	Senators	93‍–‍87	Angels, 50‍–‍40	Senators, 53‍–‍37	
Los Angeles Angels vs Texas Rangers	Angels	439‍–‍413	Angels, 237‍–‍183	Rangers, 230‍–‍202	
Overall Regular season games	Angels	526‍–‍506	Angels, 287‍–‍223	Rangers, 283‍–‍239	

== Connections between the teams ==
Name	Position(s)	Angels' tenure	Rangers' tenure
Vladimir Guerrero	Right Fielder	2004–2009	2010
Josh Hamilton	Outfielder	2013–2014	2008–2012, 2015
Mike Napoli	First Baseman/Catcher	2006–2010	2011–2012, 2015, 2017
Darren Oliver	Pitcher	2007–2009	1993–1998; 2000–2001; 2010–2011
Nolan Ryan	Pitcher	1972–1979	1989–1993
C. J. Wilson	Pitcher	2012–2015	2005–2011

== See also ==
- Cowboys–Rams rivalry
- California–Texas rivalry
