= List of U.S. states by median home price =

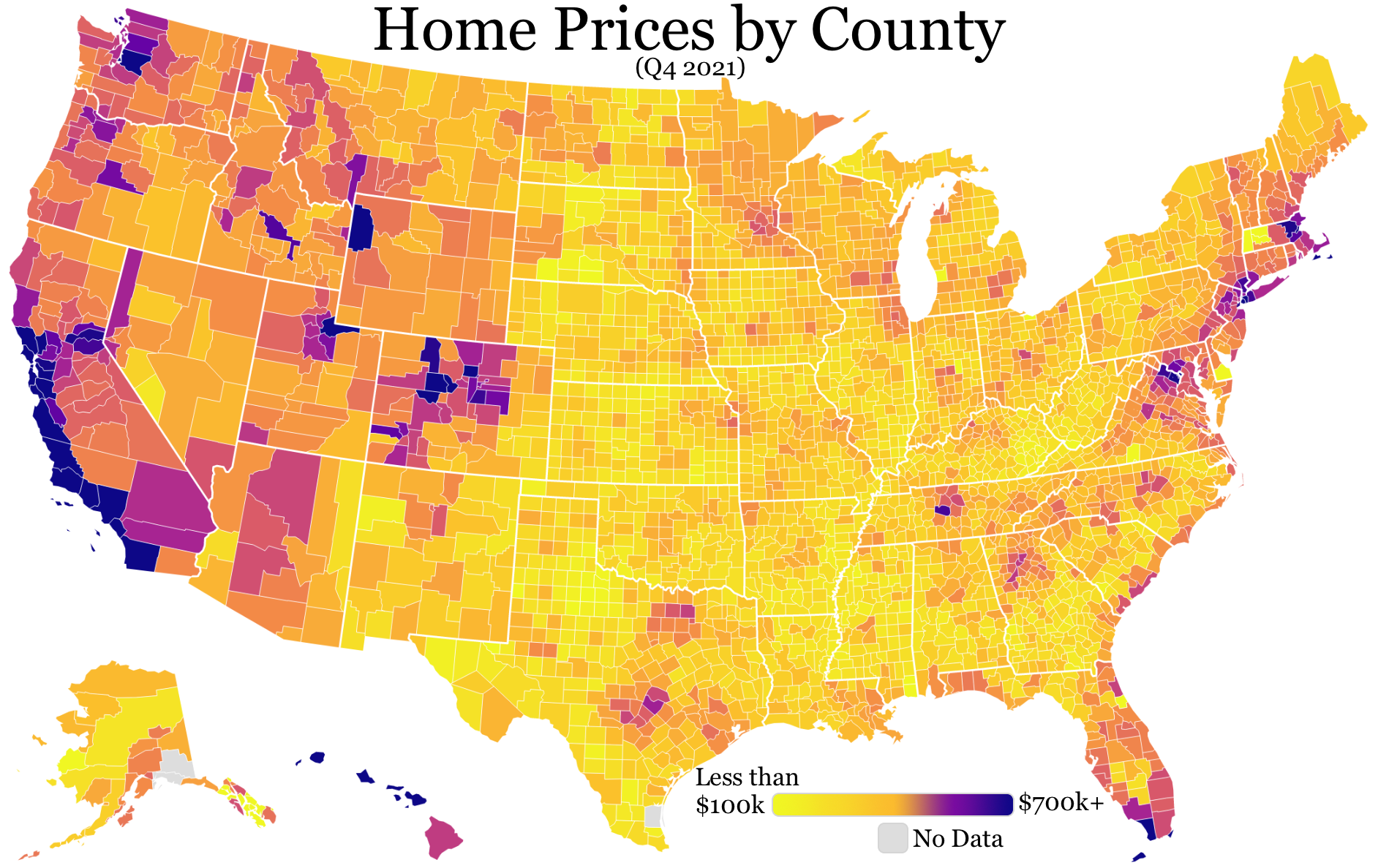
Home prices by county (2021) <$100,000 $200,000 $300,000 $400,000 $500,000 $600,000 $700,000+

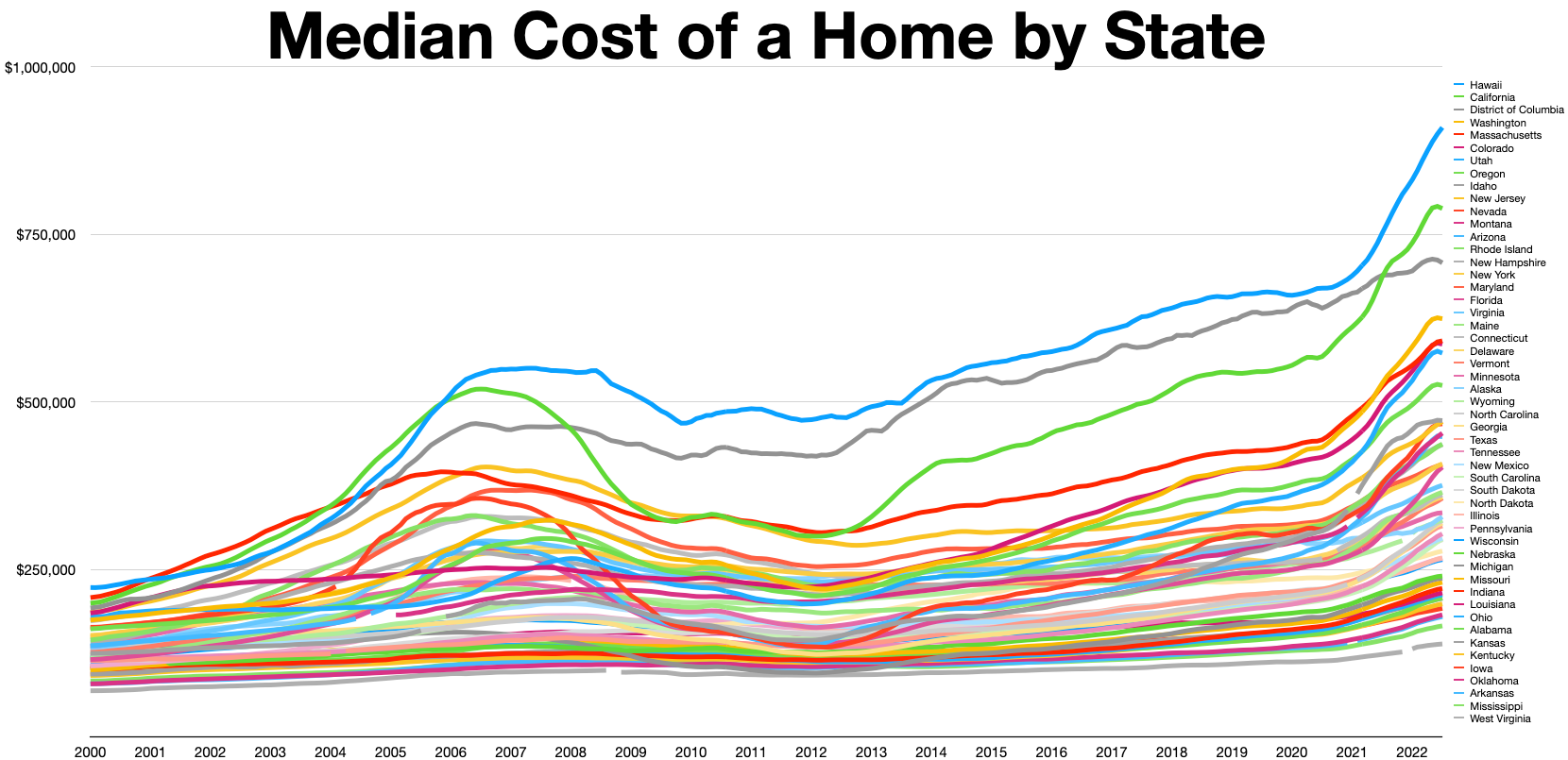
Cost of housing by state

This article contains a list of U.S. states and the District of Columbia by median home price, according to data from Zillow.

== List U.S. states and D.C. by median home price ==
U.S. states and D.C. by median home price, July 2025 (in July 2025 dollars)
State rank	State or territory	Median home price in US$
1	Hawaii	$973,555
2	California	$809,227
—	District of Columbia	$764,716
3	Massachusetts	$685,886
4	Washington	$626,603
5	New Jersey	$588,776
6	Colorado	$567,724
7	Utah	$546,553
8	New Hampshire	$528,377
9	Oregon	$515,474
10	Rhode Island	$506,723
11	New York	$487,737
12	Nevada	$472,477
13	Montana	$467,372
14	Connecticut	$465,586
15	Idaho	$465,288
16	Maryland	$451,121
17	Arizona	$440,228
18	Virginia	$416,516
19	Maine	$413,961
20	Vermont	$406,730
21	Delaware	$406,448
22	Florida	$405,280
23	Alaska	$395,096
—	United States	$370,523
24	Wyoming	$367,126
25	Minnesota	$358,473
26	North Carolina	$339,287
27	Georgia	$338,734
28	Tennessee	$335,560
29	Wisconsin	$334,636
30	South Dakota	$321,393
31	New Mexico	$316,778
32	Texas	$308,212
33	South Carolina	$306,512
34	Illinois	$292,156
35	North Dakota	$289,622
36	Pennsylvania	$286,397
37	Nebraska	$277,389
38	Missouri	$264,646
39	Michigan	$259,702
40	Indiana	$254,931
41	Ohio	$246,244
42	Kansas	$242,859
43	Iowa	$237,357
44	Alabama	$231,946
45	Kentucky	$225,191
46	Arkansas	$219,825
47	Oklahoma	$218,822
48	Louisiana	$213,371
49	Mississippi	$189,849
50	West Virginia	$169,759

== See also ==
- Housing insecurity in the United States
