= Consulting firm =

Firm of experts providing professional assistance

A consulting firm or simply consultancy is a professional service firm that provides expertise and specialised labour for a fee, through the use of consultants. Consulting firms may have one employee or thousands; they may consult in a broad range of domains, for example, management, engineering, and so on.

Management consultants, in particular, typically work with company executives and provide them with generalists and industry-specific specialists, known as subject-matter experts, usually trained in management or in business schools. The deliverable of a management consultant is usually recommendations for achieving a company objective, leading to a company project.

Many consulting firms complement the recommendations with implementation support, either by the consultants or by technicians and other experts.

Consulting services are part of the professional services and account for several hundred billion dollars in annual revenues. Between 2010 and 2015, the 10 largest consulting firms alone made 170 billion dollars growth revenue and the average annual growth rate is around 4%.

According to The Economist, the industry's most important firms are the "Great eight" consulting firms which consist of Bain, BCG, McKinsey, Deloitte, EY, KPMG, PwC and Accenture.

== Segments ==
The segmentation of advisory services varies widely across organizations and countries. Categorization is unclear, in part because of the upheavals that have occurred in this industry in recent years.

One approach is to separate services into five broad service delivery families, considering the managers they are targeting:

- Services related to the company's overall strategy, which are addressed to the CEO,
- Services related to marketing, communication, sales and public relations, which are addressed to the CMO,
- Services related to management, financial management, taxation, accounting, compliance with regulations, for the CFO,
- Services related to the company's operations, intended for operational management, which may be different depending on the industrial sector (technology director, plant managers, operations directors, Research and Development managers), for instance COO and CTO,
- Service related to information technology (see IT consulting) intended for information management, which are addressed to the CIO.

== Models of business ==
A consulting firm's model of business may be compared to staffing, wherein the objective is to lower labour costs for clients for an intended result, or relative to an intended result or output, in order to charge for a profit margin for the consulting firm. Clients are looking to procure or purchase external help and assistance. Consulting firms sustain their revenues from a labour economic point of view as a method for distributing labour, where certain positions, roles or fields of expertise within the labour market find it more suitable for contract work, as contrasted to in-house employment, for a few conceivable reasons:

- Client needs being incontinuous, or continuous but otherwise volatile in that they may vary from time to time in nature and scope,
- A potential scarcity of skilled labour available on the market,
- The possibility of offering a higher work level activity,
- The necessity for licensed labour or other qualified labour for tasks not making up the core task assembly of the client organization,
- Looking to get a hold of or utilize of third party intellectual property, intangible capital or other types of goodwill belonging to the consulting firm.

Aside from the economic arguments stated above, consulting also acts as a corporate services model:

- Where internal consulting solutions (at which the client firm acts as a de-facto employer) may run into issues of scope once projects get too large, external consulting firms may be able to provide a better solution for the larger consulting deals on the market,
- Risk and compliance audits may be suitable for a consulting contract as a means of safeguarding neutrality,
- Consulting comprises the natural service model for large-scale transformation projects in client enterprises,
- Certain service models, such as financial auditing and economic consulting, are effectively required to offer their services in the form of consulting agreements due to a lack of industry position outside of the tertiary sector,
- Some clients may decide to hand over entire assemblies of tasks to consulting firms for a period of time - this is akin to outsourcing agreements, however with the exception of a predestined due date which is atypical in outsourcing,
- Consulting is also used as a third party service model as could be seen in for example contract formations of b2b-deals, legal consulting and M&A activity,

consequently acting as a source of profit for clients, consulting firms and society as proffered. The consulting business model can be seen as a result of the knowledge economy, and as a subset of the knowledge industry. Today it is not rare for consulting firms to offer what may be considered turnkey solutions to clients. Knowledge transfer is also a prevalent sales argument for consulting services.

=== Outsourcing ===
It is common practice for consulting firms to be involved in the sale of outsourcing services as well. Similarly, outsourcing firms may offer consulting services as a way to help integrate their services with the client. Many consulting firms offer several service packages as part of their business portfolio. While consulting services and outsourcing services are compatible, issues arise if the clients are not aware of the differences between the two. From an ethical standpoint, it is important that clients are aware of what type or types of services they are procuring, as consulting services are meant to be a complementary service to the client firm, whereas outsourcing effectively aims to replace parts of the client firm that are imperative to their operational ability.

== Types ==
There are different types of consulting firms serving different sectors. They mainly fall under the following fields:

- Architecture and Engineering
- Financial accounting services
- Health care
- Safety in the workplace
- Hotel and hospitality industry
- Human resources
- Information technology
- Legal
- Management
- Music
- Regulatory compliance
- Process safety

Some consulting firms also serve niche sectors, such as:

- advertising/marketing/public relations
- environmental consulting
- entertainment/media
- energy
- logistics
- consulting in politics and the public sector
- real estate
- recycling
- small business
- raw material supply

== Impact of consulting firms in emerging economies ==
=== Negative impacts ===
The impact of consulting firms on local businesses in emerging economies do not always have positive effects. One reason for this is that firms in emerging economies suffer from the inferiority of their technologies and innovation capabilities, thus, although they have access to consulting firms, they cannot make the most of the advice given. Advice given by consulting firms to clients may not be used efficiently as clients firms in emerging markets tend to suffer due to a lack of infrastructure, organisation, and education. Another reason firms in emerging economies struggle to effectively use consulting services is that innovation is very costly and risky.

=== Positive impacts ===
As noted above, consulting firms in emerging economies do also have positive impacts. Positive impacts include: increases in employment, increase in entrepreneurial spirit and higher wages for employees.

== Impact of consulting firms in developed economies ==
The impact of consulting firms varies greatly between sectors, countries, and use cases. Consulting firms typically market similar services and solutions across industries and client groups, which can lead to "one-size-fits-all" approaches whose suitability for particular clients can vary. In the public sector, scholarship has identified a globally growing reliance on consultants in the past decades, which can lead to problems such as dependencies on external consultants and reduced accountability, as public governance and service provision gets veiled behind business secrecy practices. Both management and tax consultancies have also been recurrently in the center of scandals involving the promotion of questionable business practices or defending clients with troubled track record, for example, in human rights or environmental responsibility issues.

One study shows that there is a significant difference between efficiency between consulting firms in America (developed economy) and consulting firms in Asia Pacific regions (emerging economy). Efficiency scores of consulting firms in America were significantly higher than consulting firms in Asia Pacific regions. This is because firms in developed economies have better infrastructure, organisation and education, thus advice given by consulting firms is used efficiently.

== Examples of consulting firms ==
Many consulting firms provide services across a range of industries. Notable firms include McKinsey & Company, Boston Consulting Group, Bain & Company, Kearney (consulting firm), Deloitte, KPMG, PwC, and Ernst & Young.

== Successful consulting firm cases ==
=== Mexico ===
In 2013, there was a randomized trial in Mexico where 432 small and medium enterprises were allowed access to management consulting services for one year. As a result of this trial, there were many positive impacts. Such positive impacts include: increase in entrepreneurial spirit, increases in employment and higher wages for employees. Even after 5 years after the trial, positive impacts are still active. These results were achieved by advertising a consulting program to 432 enterprises and recorded data on the positive effects.

== See also ==
- Consulting
- Information technology consulting
- Knowledge economy
- Knowledge industry
- Knowledge intensive business services
- Knowledge transfer
- Management consulting
- Professional services network
- Staffing
- Temporary work
