= List of U.S. states and territories by net migration =

This is a list of U.S. states and the District of Columbia by annual net migration. The first table lists U.S. states and the District of Columbia by annual net domestic migration, while the second table lists U.S. states and the District of Columbia by annual net international migration, and the third table lists U.S. states and the District of Columbia by annual net combined migration, which is the summation of domestic and international migration. There is a separate table for the U.S. territories. The term net domestic migration describes the total number of people moving to a state from another state minus people moving to another state from that state. The term net international migration describes the total number of people moving to a state from another country minus people moving to another country from that state.

== Net domestic migration ==
U.S. states by net domestic migration (From April 1, 2020, to July 1, 2024)
National Rank	State	Total net domestic migration (2020–2024)	Net domestic migration rate per 1,000 inhabitants (2020–2024)
1	Florida	872,722	40.52
2	Texas	747,730	25.65
3	North Carolina	392,010	37.54
4	South Carolina	314,953	61.54
5	Arizona	252,654	35.30
6	Tennessee	252,180	36.48
7	Georgia	205,811	19.21
8	Idaho	120,350	65.44
9	Alabama	119,132	23.71
10	Oklahoma	93,218	23.54
11	Nevada	81,386	26.21
12	Arkansas	68,640	22.79
13	Montana	53,496	49.34
14	Utah	51,891	15.86
15	Maine	49,132	36.04
16	Delaware	46,357	46.83
17	Missouri	42,234	6.86
18	Colorado	31,172	5.40
19	Indiana	30,239	4.46
20	New Hampshire	29,170	21.18
21	Kentucky	28,781	6.39
22	South Dakota	21,370	24.10
23	West Virginia	10,296	5.74
24	Wyoming	7,305	12.66
25	Vermont	6,160	9.58
26	Wisconsin	2,958	0.50
27	Oregon	−1,870	−0.44
28	North Dakota	−6,450	−8.28
29	New Mexico	−7,984	−3.77
30	Rhode Island	−8,631	−7.87
31	Iowa	−9,482	−2.97
32	Nebraska	−13,758	−7.01
33	Alaska	−19,564	−26.68
34	Washington	−21,717	−2.82
35	Mississippi	−22,153	−7.48
36	Kansas	−23,923	−8.14
37	Connecticut	−24,206	−6.71
—N/a	District of Columbia	−29,330	−42.54
38	Virginia	−34,497	−4.00
39	Ohio	−38,018	−3.22
40	Minnesota	−47,930	−8.40
41	Pennsylvania	−49,031	−3.77
42	Hawaii	−50,754	−34.88
43	Michigan	−67,785	−6.73
44	Maryland	−120,435	−19.48
45	Louisiana	−129,488	−27.80
46	Massachusetts	−162,751	−23.14
47	New Jersey	−192,209	−20.69
48	Illinois	−418,056	−32.61
49	New York	−966,209	−47.82
50	California	−1,234,030	−37.04

== Net international migration ==
U.S. states by net international migration (From April 1, 2020, to July 1, 2024)
National Rank	State	Total net international migration (2020–2024)	Net international migration rate per 1,000 inhabitants (2020–2024)
1	Florida	1,059,143	49.18
2	California	934,230	23.62
3	Texas	820,761	28.16
4	New York	519,395	25.71
5	New Jersey	327,188	35.22
6	Illinois	278,657	21.73
7	Massachusetts	255,102	36.27
8	Washington	206,851	26.84
9	Pennsylvania	198,901	15.30
10	North Carolina	181,262	17.36
11	Georgia	170,551	15.92
12	Michigan	164,465	16.32
13	Ohio	164,274	13.92
14	Arizona	158,932	22.20
15	Virginia	158,813	18.40
16	Maryland	154,183	24.94
17	Connecticut	95,160	26.38
18	Indiana	88,582	13.05
19	Colorado	83,062	14.38
20	Minnesota	81,091	14.21
21	Utah	77,904	23.81
22	Tennessee	73,139	10.58
23	Nevada	71,488	23.02
24	Kentucky	70,614	15.67
25	Wisconsin	63,489	10.77
26	South Carolina	60,691	11.86
27	Louisiana	59,112	12.69
28	Missouri	58,918	9.57
29	Oregon	53,080	12.53
30	Iowa	49,793	15.61
31	Kansas	42,138	14.34
32	Oklahoma	40,811	10.31
33	Alabama	38,850	7.73
—N/a	District of Columbia	34,639	50.23
34	Nebraska	33,331	16.99
35	Hawaii	30,735	21.12
36	New Mexico	30,125	14.23
37	Rhode Island	26,871	24.49
38	Idaho	22,029	11.98
39	Mississippi	19,968	6.74
40	Arkansas	18,737	6.22
41	Delaware	17,748	17.93
42	Maine	13,800	10.12
43	North Dakota	13,165	16.90
44	Alaska	11,176	15.24
45	New Hampshire	10,938	7.94
46	West Virginia	7,597	4.24
47	South Dakota	6,665	7.52
48	Vermont	6,038	9.39
49	Wyoming	3,028	5.25
50	Montana	2,622	2.42

== Net combined migration ==
U.S. states by net combined migration - domestic and international (From April 1, 2020, to July 1, 2024)
National rank	State	Total net combined migration (2020–2024)	Total net combined migration per 1,000 residents (2020–2024)
1	Florida	1,931,865	89.69
2	Texas	1,568,491	53.81
3	North Carolina	573,272	54.90
4	Arizona	411,586	57.50
5	Georgia	376,362	35.13
6	South Carolina	375,644	73.39
7	Tennessee	325,319	47.06
8	Washington	185,134	24.02
9	Alabama	157,982	31.44
10	Nevada	152,874	49.23
11	Pennsylvania	149,870	11.53
12	Idaho	142,379	77.42
13	New Jersey	134,979	14.53
14	Oklahoma	134,029	33.85
15	Utah	129,795	39.67
16	Ohio	126,256	10.70
17	Virginia	124,316	14.40
18	Indiana	118,821	17.51
19	Colorado	114,234	19.78
20	Missouri	101,152	16.43
21	Kentucky	99,395	22.06
22	Michigan	96,680	9.59
23	Massachusetts	92,351	13.13
24	Arkansas	87,377	29.01
25	Connecticut	70,954	19.67
26	Wisconsin	66,447	11.27
27	Delaware	64,105	64.76
28	Maine	62,932	46.17
29	Montana	56,118	51.76
30	Oregon	51,210	12.09
31	Iowa	40,311	12.63
32	New Hampshire	40,108	29.12
33	Maryland	33,748	5.46
34	Minnesota	33,161	5.81
35	South Dakota	28,035	31.62
36	New Mexico	22,141	10.46
37	Nebraska	19,573	9.98
38	Rhode Island	18,240	16.62
39	Kansas	18,215	6.20
40	West Virginia	17,893	9.98
41	Vermont	12,198	18.97
42	Wyoming	10,333	17.91
43	North Dakota	6,715	8.62
—N/a	District of Columbia	5,309	7.70
44	Mississippi	−2,185	−0.74
45	Alaska	−8,388	−11.44
46	Hawaii	−20,019	−13.76
47	Louisiana	−70,376	−15.11
48	Illinois	−139,399	−10.87
49	New York	−446,814	−22.12
50	California	−530,886	−13.42

== U.S. territories ==
U.S. territories by net migration
Territory	Net migration rate per 1,000 inhabitants (2020)	Net migration rate per 1,000 inhabitants (2021)
American Samoa	−26.1	−32.18
Guam	−11.0	−10.98
Northern Mariana Islands	−15.4	−13.67
Puerto Rico	−14.1	−13
U.S. Virgin Islands	−7.5	−7.42
