= New York exodus =

Domestic migration from New York

Map of New York state

New York Exodus colloquially referred to as Empire State Exodus or Domestic Migration from New York is an existing phenomenon of continuing outmigration from New York, particularly New York City to other U.S. states. Domestically, New York has experienced net-negative migration since the 1970s but births and foreign immigration generally offset these trends. The outflow of residents strongly accelerated during the COVID-19 pandemic. New Yorkers have cited high taxes, affordability, politics, underperforming schools, and family as reasons for leaving. New Yorkers have left for a variety of states with the top destinations being New Jersey, Florida, Pennsylvania, Texas, and Connecticut. The trend has also been used to describe businesses leaving a cumbersome regulatory and tax environment.

== Origins ==
New York has experienced negative net migration for different periods going back to 1967. Time Magazine wrote about an "exodus from fun city" in reference to population decline in New York City at the time. Other writings refer to the corporate exodus from New York and further emigration into the 1970s. The term Empire State exodus first appeared in 2009 in the wake of large amounts of outmigration from New York in the 2000s. Finally, New York Exodus as a term emerged in a political context most notably first, in a paper written by Libertarian gubernatorial candidate Larry Sharpe. However, that term came into more frequent use following lockdowns during the Covid-19 pandemic.

== Demographics ==
New York and its New York City core have been a strong magnet for international immigration since the country's founding. Famously New York was the first capital under the Constitution and New York City served as a main entry point for immigrants. With Ellis Island alone processing 12 million during its operations. Those dynamics of international migration have yet to change but the number of New Yorkers relocating to other locations has. A study from the Citizens Budget Commission shows New York State and city losing residents to domestic outmigration since at least 2012. 37%-38% of New York City's population is estimated to be foreign born at 3.1-3.3 million people. Mirroring percentage-wise the previous city high of 41% back in 1910. Overall, 23% of New Yorkers are foreign born at 4.62 million people. Foreign born residents have increased across New York State including Peekskill, Yonkers, and Putnam county since the 2010s, partially offsetting some of the native population loss experienced by the state.

Going back to 1990 the NYS Department of Taxation has reported that New York state has had an outflow of taxpayers, at an average of 65,000 per year. From 2020-2024, New York has lost 238,000 people or 1.2% of its population which in percentage terms is only second to West Virginia. The rest of the U.S. grew 2.6% during the same period. From 2024-2025 domestic migration was at a net negative of 137,600 more people leaving the state than moving in. From 2015-2025 New York's population declined by .42% while the rest of the country grew by 6.2%. From 2022-2023 individuals making between $25,000 and $50,000 were the top group to leave New York at -17,338. Many states have received an inflow of New York residents with over 80,000 moving to Florida and New Jersey. The New York Metro area has been at net negative migration with those college educated 21-64 with that number peaking over -100,000 in the in the early 2020s. While 100,000 working-age graduates moved into the metro area, more than 200,000 left. NYC has not been alone in this burden, most of its upstate counties and Nassau county, Long Island have been subject to varying degrees of population loss. New York City's black population has declined by 200,000 the last two decades. While the number of black children living in NYC declined by 19% between 2010 and 2020. Meanwhile the Asian and Hispanic population has risen 34% and 7% in that same time frame.

== Causes ==
New York regularly ranks as one of the most expensive states in the country along with some of the highest tax burden.

=== For individuals ===
Many individuals leaving New York as a whole are often those leaving from NYC. In 2023, rents hit record highs and an estimated 17% higher than they were before the Covid-19 pandemic. It's estimated that the median family needs to make $100,000 to afford necessities and unexpected costs. Despite this reality, the median income in the city is only $76,000. Residents with young children are 40% more likely to leave the state with the percentage of households leaving due to affordability doubling to 36% since the pandemic. The affordability crisis is especially hard-hitting for the state's minority residents. Black New Yorkers are 50% more likely to leave than white New Yorkers while Hispanics are 38% more likely to leave. Rent availability is also a problem in New York with only 1.4% of NYC apartments being available in 2023.

==== Politics ====
New York leaders have made waves in the past encouraging their political opposition to leave the state. In 2014 NY governor Andrew Cuomo derided Republicans campaigning against the NY SAFE Act by arguing they were extremists and as a result had no place in New York. His comment also referenced Republicans opposed to abortion and gay marriage as having no place in the state. According to the New York Observer NYC mayor Bill De Blasio would go on to defend Cuomo in his comments. Several years later, in 2021, Hochul accused those who refused to get the Covid-19 vaccine of defying God. This coincided with her continuance of Andrew Cuomo's lockdown restrictions. During her reelection campaign and 2022 midterms Hochul said, Republicans to the likes of Lee Zeldin, Marc Molinaro, and Donald Trump do not belong in the state. For every Republican that moves into New York, it's estimated that 4.5 leave. Across the country about 19% more Republicans moved to Florida than Democrats. Looking ahead, according to the New York State Energy Research and Development Authority the cap and trade system expected to take effect in 2030 will add significant costs to households. Across New York State the system is estimated to cost households an extra $4,100 with gas prices rising an additional $2.23 from their current levels.

=== For businesses ===
The tax burden in New York and especially New York City significantly outpaces common zero income tax-havens of Florida and Texas. Top marginal tax rates can exceed 10-14% in the city. Business executives cited the potential for reduced tax burdens as their primary motivator for moving. 24% of office employers surveyed in 2022 in New York City cited lack of safety during commutes and on public transit as the reason for not bringing employees back in person post-pandemic. Major businesses alongside their leaders have decided to pull out of New York including Paul Singer and Elliot Management in 2020, who relocated to Miami. Other firms that have at least relocated offices or headquarters in more recent years include Wells Fargo, Paulson Capital, and Baron Funds who manage tens of billions of dollars. Advocacy group Partnership for New York City argues that Texas now has a competitive advantage over New York. They argue that Texas's business friendly environment such as low corporate tax and no personal income tax make it desirable for both businesses and their employees. Various regulations and laws also leave building owners and renters paying large premiums over the life of a building. For example, insurance costs consume 8-10% of development in New York City compared to 2% to 4% in New Jersey and Massachusetts. Across New York State 70% of businesses say their energy costs have increased with 40% saying those increases have been significant.

== Consequences ==
In 2010 New York state claimed 12.7% of millionaires in the United States; that number had dropped to 9% by 2023. This is estimated to have cost New York City and state a combined $11.7 billion dollars. The percentage of billionaires in California, Texas, and Florida all grew during that same period. According to the Tax Foundation, New York lost $62,000 adjusted gross income (AGI) per person from 2022-2023. After the 2020, census New York lost a congressional seat by just 89 people. Further, looking ahead to the 2030 census, New York is on track to lose three congressional seats. NYC services in particular have seen a decline in their use. New York City public schools have lost 150,000 students since 2014. Due to high fixed costs as students leave the cost per pupil in New York continues to rise. 81% of school districts outside of New York City had fewer students in 2024 than they did in the 2018-2019 school year. Spending per pupil from state aid has roughly doubled since 2012 from $7,264 to $14,304. Overall, New York spends an average of $26,571 per child. New York, previously known for its economic dynamism and entrepreneurial spirit fell below the national average and an all-time low for new startups in 2021.
