= Knowledge industries =

Knowledge industries are those industries which are based on their intensive use of technology and/or human capital. While most industries are dependent in some way on knowledge as inputs, knowledge industries are particularly dependent on knowledge and technology to generate revenue. Some industries that are included in this category include education, consulting, science, finance, insurance, information technology, health service, and communications. The term "knowledge industry" was suggested by Austrian-American economist Fritz Machlup to describe these industries in the context of his new idea of the knowledge economy.

== Emergence ==
The production of knowledge before the Scientific Revolution had little economic impact and was practiced on a small scale. Since that time knowledge has become one of the largest and most important industrial sectors in world commerce. The emergence of knowledge as an industry has been essential in perpetuating the modern capitalist system. A modern capitalist economy relies on continuously developing and changing technology. Where pre-modern economies tended to cater to specific fixed needs, a modern economy functions by creating new needs to create sustainable profits. The knowledge industry is the main creator of needs in modern economic systems and thus plays a vital role in such systems.

Though knowledge industries had been emerging as an important sector of the modern economy, it was not until the 1960s that much study was done on knowledge as a resource or on the roles it plays in industry. Austrian-American economist Fritz Machlup first proposed and popularized the ideas of knowledge industries and the knowledge economy in his 1962 book The Production and Distribution of Knowledge in the United States. Since the publication of that book, many economists have begun to refine the idea of the knowledge industry. For example, to better research the effect of knowledge industries on the economy at large some economists have created sub-categories within knowledge industries. To study the effect of knowledge industry on the Canadian economy over time, Canadian economists split up the various knowledge industries into categories of low-, medium-, and high-knowledge industries. These categories took into account various attributes of these industries such as wages, proportion of capital spent on research and development, and the proportion of workers with university degrees.

== Examples ==
=== Education ===
As a knowledge industry, education accounted for around 30% of the Gross National Product in the United States in the late 1960s. Schools contribute greatly to both the production and intake of knowledge and play a large role in the economy. While it is difficult to quantify the economics of education it can still be easily shown that schools are economic units as they use resources to achieve their goals. Similarly, it is clear that educational institutions and the educational system itself are undergoing a process of industrialization. Schools also have the important economic characteristics of a business in that they employ people to work for them. Additionally, as globalization has increased its influence in all aspects of the economy, higher education has become more tuned to supporting commercial goals, often to the detriment of the non-profit and public sectors.

=== Communications ===
The communications industry, including telecommunications, is an important knowledge industry and is characterized as a "medium-knowledge service". Knowledge growth in the communications industry is generally produced by research and development. It is referred to as a medium-knowledge service because of its lower levels of investment in knowledge workers than the high-knowledge services like medicine, education, and the aerospace industry.

=== Health and medical products ===
The pharmaceutical industry is a major knowledge industry. In many ways this industry typifies the high-knowledge industries as much of its resources are invested heavily in highly skilled and educated researchers. As a result of the skill and time necessary to develop medications and medical products, pharmaceutical companies employ highly educated people who command high wages.

== See also ==
- Knowledge economy
