= List of Boston Bruins records =

This is a list of franchise records for the Boston Bruins of the National Hockey League.

== Team records ==
=== Single season ===
Most points	135	2022–23
Most wins	65	2022–23
Most losses	47	1961–62, 1996–97
Most ties (Note: Beginning in the 2005–06 season, ties are no longer possible. At the same time, the league began tracking overtime losses for goaltenders.)	21	1954–55
Most goals for	399	1970–71
Most goals against	306	1961–62
Fewest points	12; 38	1924–25 (30 game season); 1961–62
Fewest wins	6; 14	1924–25 (30 game season); 1962–63
Fewest losses	5; 13	1929–30 (44 game season); 1971–72
Fewest ties	0; 5	1924–25 (30 game season); 1972–73
Fewest goals for	49; 147	1924–25 (30 game season); 1955–56
Fewest goals against	52; 172	1928–29 (44 game season); 1952–53
Most penalty minutes	2443	1987–88
Fewest penalty minutes	207; 449	1943–44 (50 game season); 1949–50
Most shutouts	15	1928–29 (Hal Winkler 15)

=== Streaks ===
Winning streaks
Overall	14	December 3, 1929 - January 9, 1930
Home	20	December 3, 1929 - March 18, 1930
Away	9	March 2, 2014 - March 30, 2014
Losing streaks
Overall	11	December 3, 1924 - January 5, 1925
Home	11	December 8, 1924 - February 17, 1925
Away	14	December 27, 1964 - February 21, 1965
Undefeated streaks
Overall	23	December 22, 1940 - February 23, 1941 (15W, 8T)
Home	27	November 22, 1970 - March 20, 1971 (26W, 1T)
Away	15	December 22, 1940 - March 16, 1941 (9W, 6T)
Winless streaks
Overall	20	January 28, 1962 - March 11, 1962 (16L, 4T)
Home	11	December 8, 1924 - February 17, 1925
Away	14	3 times

== Career regular season records ==
=== Skaters ===
Games played
#	Player	GP	Seasons
1	Ray Bourque	1,518	1979–2000
2	John Bucyk	1,436	1957–1978
3	Patrice Bergeron	1,294	2003–2023
4	Brad Marchand	1090	2009–2025
5	Don Sweeney	1,052	1988–2003
Active leader
14	David Pastrnak	833	2014–present

Goals
#	Player	G	Seasons
1	John Bucyk	545	1957–1978
2	Phil Esposito	459	1967–1976
3	Patrice Bergeron	427	2003–2023
4	Brad Marchand	422	2009–2025
5	David Pastrnak	420	2014–present
Active leader
5	David Pastrnak	420	2014–present

Assists
#	Player	A	Seasons
1	Ray Bourque	1,111	1979–2000
2	John Bucyk	794	1957–1978
3	Bobby Orr	624	1966–1976
4	Patrice Bergeron	613	2003–2023
5	David Krejci	555	2007–2023
Active leader
9	David Pastrnak	513	2014–present

Points
#	Player	P	Seasons
1	Ray Bourque	1,506	1979–2000
2	John Bucyk	1,339	1957–1978
3	Patrice Bergeron	1,040	2003-2023
4	Phil Esposito	1,012	1967–1976
5	Brad Marchand	976	2009–2025
Active leader
6	David Pastrnak	933	2014–present

PIMS
#	Player	PIM	Seasons
1	Terry O'Reilly	2,095	1971–1985
2	Mike Milbury	1,552	1975–1987
3	Keith Crowder	1,261	1980–1989
4	Brad Marchand	1113	2009–2025
5	Eddie Shore	1,090	1926–1940
Active leader
42	Charlie McAvoy	491	2017–present

Power play goals
#	Player	PPG	Seasons
1	Ray Bourque	164	1979–2000
2	John Bucyk	157	1957–1978
3	Phil Esposito	150	1967–1976
4	David Pastrnak	132	2014–present
5	Patrice Bergeron	131	2003–2023
Active leader
4	David Pastrnak	132	2014–present

Shorthanded goals
#	Player	SHG	Seasons
1	Brad Marchand	36	2009–2025
2	Rick Middleton	25	1976–1988
3	Derek Sanderson	24	1967–1974
4	Patrice Bergeron	22	2003-2023
5	Don Marcotte	21	1965–1982
Active leader
T-73	Charlie McAvoy	2	2017–present
T-73	Pavel Zacha	2	2022–present

Game winning goals
#	Player	GWG	Seasons
1	John Bucyk	88	1957–1978
2	Brad Marchand	82	2009-2025
3	Patrice Bergeron	81	2003–2023
4	Phil Esposito	77	1967–1976
5	David Pastrnak	68	2014–present
Active leader
5	David Pastrnak	68	2014–present

Game tying goals
#	Player	GTG	Seasons
1	Ray Bourque	13	1979–2000
2	Glen Murray	4	1991–2008
2	Sergei Samsonov	4	1997–2006
3	7 Tied	3	--
Active leader
N/A	--	--	--

Overtime game winning goals
#	Player	OTG	Seasons
1	Brad Marchand	21	2009-2025
2	David Pastrnak	13	2014–present
3	Dit Clapper	10	1927-1947
3	Glen Murray	10	1991–2008
5	Patrice Bergeron	9	2003–2023
Active leader
2	David Pastrnak	13	2014–present

Highest +/-
#	Player	+	Seasons
1	Bobby Orr	574	1966–1976
2	Ray Bourque	493	1979–2000
3	Dallas Smith	331	1959–1977
4	Phil Esposito	306	1967–1976
5	Patrice Bergeron	289	2003–2023
Active leader
17	Charlie McAvoy	157	2017–present

=== Goaltenders ===
Games played
#	Player	GP	Seasons
1	Tuukka Rask	564	2007–2022
2	Tiny Thompson	468	1928–1939
3	Frank Brimsek	444	1938–1949
3	Eddie Johnston	444	1962–1973
5	Gerry Cheevers	416	1966–1980
Active leader
10	Jeremy Swayman	245	2021–present

Wins
#	Player	W	Seasons
1	Tuukka Rask	308	2007–2022
2	Tiny Thompson	252	1928–1939
3	Frank Brimsek	230	1938–1949
4	Gerry Cheevers	229	1966–1980
5	Tim Thomas	196	2002–2012
Active leader
T-9	Jeremy Swayman	132	2021–present

Losses
#	Player	L	Seasons
1	Eddie Johnston	192	1962–1973
2	Tuukka Rask	165	2007–2022
3	Tiny Thompson	153	1928–1939
4	Frank Brimsek	144	1938–1949
5	Tim Thomas	121	2002–2012
Active leader
9	Jeremy Swayman	80	2021–present

Ties
#	Player	T	Seasons
1	Gerry Cheevers	74	1966–1980
2	Frank Brimsek	70	1938–1949
3	Tiny Thompson	63	1928–1939
4	Eddie Johnston	54	1962–1973
5	"Sugar" Jim Henry	44	1951-1955
Active leader
N/A	--	--	--

Overtime/shootout losses
#	Player	OTL	Seasons
1	Tuukka Rask	66	2007–2022
2	Tim Thomas	45	2002–2012
3	Jeremy Swayman	26	2021–present
4	Jaroslav Halak	10	2018–2021
5	Linus Ullmark	10	2022–2024
Active leader
3	Jeremy Swayman	22	2021–present

Goals against average
#	Player	GAA	Seasons
1	Tiny Thompson	1.99	1928–1939
2	Tuukka Rask	2.28	2007–2022
3	Linus Ullmark	2.28	2022–2024
4	Byron Dafoe	2.30	1997–2002
5	Tim Thomas	2.48	2002–2012
Active leader
9	Jeremy Swayman	2.61	2021–present

- Minimum 100 games

Save percentage
#	Player	SV%	Seasons
1	Linus Ullmark	.924	2022–2024
2	Tim Thomas	.921	2002–2012
3	Tuukka Rask	.921	2007–2022
4	Terry Sawchuk	.917	1955–1957
5	Byron Dafoe	.910	1997–2002
Active leader
6	Jeremy Swayman	.910	2021–present

- Minimum 100 games

Shutouts
#	Player	SO	Seasons
1	Tiny Thompson	74	1928–1939
2	Tuukka Rask	52	2007–2022
3	Frank Brimsek	35	1938–1949
4	Tim Thomas	31	2002–2012
5	Eddie Johnston	27	1962–1973
Active leader
10	Jeremy Swayman	18	2021–present

== Single season records ==
=== Skaters ===
Goals
#	Player	G	Season
1	Phil Esposito	76	1970–1971
2	Phil Esposito	68	1973–1974
3	Phil Esposito	66	1971–1972
4	Phil Esposito	61	1974–1975
4	David Pastrnak	61	2022-2023

Assists
#	Player	A	Season
1	Bobby Orr	102	1970–1971
2	Adam Oates	97	1992–1993
3	Bobby Orr	90	1973–1974
4	Bobby Orr	89	1974–1975
5	Bobby Orr	87	1969–1970

Points
#	Player	P	Season
1	Phil Esposito	152	1970–1971
2	Phil Esposito	145	1973–1974
3	Adam Oates	142	1992–1993
4	Bobby Orr	139	1970–1971
5	Bobby Orr	135	1974–1975

PIMS
#	Player	PIM	Season
1	Jay Miller	304	1987–1988
2	Chris Nilan	277	1990–1991
3	Terry O'Reilly	265	1979–1980
4	John Blum	263	1984–1985
5	Lyndon Byers	236	1987–1988

Power play goals
#	Player	PPG	Season
1	Phil Esposito	27	1971–1972
1	Phil Esposito	27	1974–1975
3	Cam Neely	25	1989–1990
4	Phil Esposito	24	1970–1971
4	Adam Oates	24	1992–1993

Shorthanded goals
#	Player	SHG	Season
1	Brian Rolston	9	2001–2002
2	Jerry Toppazzini	8	1957-1958
3	Don Marcotte	7	1970-1971
3	Ed Westfall	7	1970–1971
3	Derek Sanderson	7	1971–1972
3	Gregg Sheppard	7	1974–1975

Game winning goals
#	Player	GWG	Season
1	Phil Esposito	16	1970–1971
1	Phil Esposito	16	1971–1972
3	Cooney Weiland	14	1929-1930
4	Cam Neely	13	1993–1994
5	Cam Neely	12	1989–1990
5	David Pastrnak	12	2022-2023

Highest +/-
#	Player	+	Seasons
1	Bobby Orr	124	1970–1971
2	Dallas Smith	94	1970–1971
3	Bobby Orr	86	1971–1972
4	Bobby Orr	84	1973–1974
5	Bobby Orr	80	1974–1975

=== Goaltenders ===
Games played
#	Player	GP	Season
1	Jack Gelineau	70	1950–1951
1	"Sugar" Jim Henry	70	1951–1952
1	"Sugar" Jim Henry	70	1952–1953
1	"Sugar" Jim Henry	70	1953–1954
1	Eddie Johnston	70	1963–1964
1	Tuukka Rask	70	2014-2015

Wins
#	Player	W	Season
1	Pete Peeters	40	1982–1983
1	Linus Ullmark	40	2022-2023
3	Tiny Thompson	38	1929–1930
4	Andy Moog	37	1992–1993
4	Tuukka Rask	37	2016-2017

Losses
#	Player	L	Season
1	Eddie Johnston	40	1963–1964
2	Terry Sawchuk	33	1955–1956
2	Bruce Gamble	33	1960–1961
4	Eddie Johnston	32	1964–1965
5	Jack Gelineau	30	1949-1950 & 1950-1951

Ties
#	Player	T	Season
1	Jack Gelineau	18	1962–1973
2	"Sugar" Jim Henry	16	1938–1949
3	Tiny Thompson	15	1928–1939
3	John Henderson	15	1966–1980
5	4 tied	13	1997–2002

Shutouts
#	Player	SO	Season
1	Hal Winkler	15	1927–1928
2	Tiny Thompson	12	1928–1929
3	Tiny Thompson	11	1932–1933
4	Tiny Thompson	10	1935–1936
4	Frank Brimsek	10	1938–1939
4	Byron Dafoe	10	1998–1999

Overtime/shootout losses
#	Player	OTL	Season
1	Tuukka Rask	13	2014-2015
2	Tim Thomas	10	2005–2006
3	Tim Thomas	9	2010–2011
4	Tim Thomas	8	2009–2010
4	Tuukka Rask	8	2015-2016

Goals against average
#	Player	GAA	Seasons
1	Tiny Thompson	1.15	1928–1929
2	Hal Winkler	1.51	1927–1928
3	Frank Brimsek	1.56	1938–1939
4	Tiny Thompson	1.68	1935–1936
5	Tiny Thompson	1.76	1932–1933

- Minimum 40 games

Save percentage
#	Player	SV%	Seasons
1	Tim Thomas	.938	2010–2011
2	Linus Ullmark	.938	2022–2023
3	Tim Thomas	.933	2008–2009
4	Tuukka Rask	.931	2009–2010
5	Tuukka Rask	.930	2013-2014

- Minimum 30 games

== Career playoffs records ==
=== Skaters ===
Games played
#	Player	GP	Season
1	Ray Bourque	180	1979–1999
2	Patrice Bergeron	170	2004–2023
3	David Krejci	160	2007–2023
4	Brad Marchand	157	2009–2024
5	Zdeno Chara	150	2006–2020
Active leader
13	Charlie McAvoy	97	2017–present

Goals
#	Player	G	Seasons
1	Brad Marchand	56	2009–2024
2	Cam Neely	55	1986–1995
3	Patrice Bergeron	50	2004–2023
4	Phil Esposito	46	1967–1975
5	Rick Middleton	45	1976–1988
Active leaders
7	David Pastrnak	42	2017–present

Assists
#	Player	A	Seasons
1	Ray Bourque	125	1979–1999
2	David Krejci	85	2007–2023
3	Brad Marchand	82	2009–2024
4	Patrice Bergeron	78	2004–2023
5	Bobby Orr	66	1967–1975
Active leader
12	David Pastrnak	52	2017–present

Points
#	Player	P	Seasons
1	Ray Bourque	161	1979–1999
2	Brad Marchand	138	2009–2024
3	Patrice Bergeron	128	2004–2023
3	David Krejci	128	2007–2023
5	Phil Esposito	102	1967–1975
Active leader
8	David Pastrnak	94	2017–present

PIMS
#	Player	PIM	Seasons
1	Terry O'Reilly	335	1972–1985
2	Wayne Cashman	250	1957–1977
3	Mike Milbury	219	1975–1987
4	Keith Crowder	209	1980–1989
5	Derek Sanderson	187	1967–1973
Active leader
T-22	Charlie McAvoy	103	2017–present

Power play goals
#	Player	PPG	Seasons
1	Cam Neely	24	1986–1995
2	Phil Esposito	18	1967–1975
3	Patrice Bergeron	17	2004–2023
3	Brad Marchand	17	2009–2024
5	John Bucyk	16	1957–1977
5	David Pastrnak	16	2017–present
Active leader
T-5	David Pastrnak	16	2017–present

Shorthanded goals
#	Player	SHG	Seasons
1	Ed Westfall	6	1967–1972
1	Derek Sanderson	6	1967–1973
3	Gregg Sheppard	4	1972–1978
4	5 Tied	3	--
Active leader
T-9	Sean Kuraly	9	2017-2026

Game winning goals
#	Player	GWG	Seasons
1	Brad Marchand	13	2009-2024
2	Cam Neely	11	1986–1995
3	Patrice Bergeron	10	2004–2023
4	Phil Esposito	9	1967–1975
5	David Krejci	8	2007–2023
5	Rick Middleton	8	1976–1988
Active leaders
T-7	David Pastrnak	7	2017–present

=== Goaltenders ===
Games played
#	Player	GP	Seasons
1	Tuukka Rask	104	2009-2022
2	Gerry Cheevers	88	1967–1980
3	Andy Moog	70	1987–1993
4	Frank Brimsek	68	1938–1949
5	Tim Thomas	50	2002-2012
Active leader
9	Jeremy Swayman	26	2021–present

Wins
#	Player	W	Seasons
1	Tuukka Rask	57	2009–2022
2	Gerry Cheevers	53	1967–1980
3	Andy Moog	36	1987–1993
4	Frank Brimsek	32	1938–1949
5	Tim Thomas	29	2002–2012
Active leader
T-9	Jeremy Swayman	11	2021–present

Losses
#	Player	L	Seasons
1	Tuukka Rask	46	2009–2022
2	Frank Brimsek	36	1938–1949
3	Gerry Cheevers	34	1967–1980
4	Andy Moog	32	1987–1993
5	Tim Thomas	21	2002–2012
Active leader
T-7	Jeremy Swayman	14	2021–present

Goals against average
#	Player	GAA	Seasons
1	Hal Winkler	1.69	1926–1928
2	Tiny Thompson	1.72	1928–1939
3	Tim Thomas	2.07	2002–2012
4	Tuukka Rask	2.22	2009-2022
5	Byron Dafoe	2.29	1997-2002
Active leader
6	Jeremy Swayman	2.51	2021–present

- Minimum 10 games

Save percentage
#	Player	SV%	Seasons
1	Tim Thomas	.933	2002–2012
2	Tuukka Rask	.925	2009-2022
3	Andrew Raycroft	.924	2003–2004
4	Jeremy Swayman	.918	2021–present
5	Don Simmons	.915	1956–1958
Active leader
4	Jeremy Swayman	.918	2021–present

- Minimum 7 games

Shutouts
#	Player	SO	Seasons
1	Gerry Cheevers	8	1967–1980
2	Tuukka Rask	7	2009-2022
3	Tiny Thompson	6	1928–1939
3	Tim Thomas	6	2002–2012
5	4 Tied	3	--
Active leader
T-17	Jeremy Swayman	0	2021–present

== Notes ==
Active Bruins players are in Bold.
