= National Hockey League all-time results =

This is a summary of all-time National Hockey League regular season results by franchise as of the 2025–26 season, ranked in order of most wins.

== Results ==
Italics	Denotes inactive club

	Team	Seasons	GP	W	T	L	OT/SO	GF	GA	Diff	Pts	Pt%
1	Montreal Canadiens^{1}	108	7,197	3,644	837	2,487	229	22,920	19,609	+3,311	8,354	.580
2	Boston Bruins	101	7,036	3,482	791	2,527	236	22,351	20,186	+2,165	7,991	.568
3	Toronto Maple Leafs; Toronto Hockey Club (1917–1918); Toronto Arenas (1918–1919); Toronto St. Patricks (1919–1927)	108	7,196	3,234	783	2,959	220	22,224	22,102	+122	7,471	.519
4	Detroit Red Wings; Detroit Cougars (1926–1930); Detroit Falcons (1930–1932)	99	6,971	3,177	815	2,749	230	21,242	20,769	+473	7,399	.531
5	New York Rangers	99	6,970	3,110	808	2,860	192	21,253	21,102	+151	7,220	.518
6	Chicago Blackhawks; Chicago Black Hawks (1926–1986)	99	6,970	2,943	814	2,990	223	20,489	21,056	-567	6,923	.497
7	Philadelphia Flyers	58	4,581	2,249	457	1,635	240	14,770	13,513	+1,257	5,195	.567
8	St. Louis Blues	58	4,583	2,139	432	1,801	211	14,036	13,889	+147	4,921	.537
9	Pittsburgh Penguins	58	4,581	2,102	383	1,883	213	15,106	15,273	-167	4,800	.524
10	Dallas Stars; Minnesota North Stars (1967–1993)	58	4,581	2,087	459	1,826	209	13,995	14,055	-60	4,842	.528
11	Buffalo Sabres	55	4,355	2,087	409	1,735	207	13,704	13,246	+458	4,624	.531
12	Los Angeles Kings	58	4,582	1,972	424	1,960	226	14,216	14,827	-611	4,594	.501
13	Calgary Flames; Atlanta Flames (1972–1980)	53	4,200	1,966	379	1,649	206	13,492	12,981	+511	4,517	.538
14	Washington Capitals	51	4,043	1,913	303	1,613	214	12,734	12,704	+30	4,343	.537
15	New York Islanders	53	4,198	1,884	347	1,749	218	13,126	13,036	+90	4,333	.516
16	Vancouver Canucks	55	4,355	1,840	391	1,915	209	13,304	14,236	-932	4,280	.491
17	Colorado Avalanche; Quebec Nordiques (1979–1995)	46	3,644	1,765	261	1,440	178	11,864	11,434	+430	3,969	.545
18	New Jersey Devils; Kansas City Scouts (1974–1976); Colorado Rockies (1976–1982)	51	4,043	1,735	328	1,779	201	11,778	12,732	-954	3,999	.495
19	Edmonton Oilers	46	3,645	1,706	262	1,473	204	12,144	11,807	+337	3,878	.532
20	Carolina Hurricanes; Hartford Whalers (1979–1997)	46	3,642	1,619	263	1,550	210	10,941	11,511	-570	3,711	.509
21	Winnipeg Jets (1979–1996); Phoenix Coyotes (1996–2014); Arizona Coyotes (2014–2024)^{2}	44	3,480	1,424	266	1,599	191	10,346	11,597	-1,251	3,305	.475
22	Tampa Bay Lightning	33	2,604	1,224	112	1,082	186	7,579	7,779	-200	2,746	.527
23	San Jose Sharks	34	2,684	1,202	121	1,140	221	7,495	8,053	-558	2,746	.512
24	Ottawa Senators	33	2,605	1,169	115	1,115	206	7,442	7,793	-351	2,659	.510
25	Anaheim Ducks; Mighty Ducks of Anaheim (1993–2006)	32	2,521	1,149	107	1,038	227	6,741	7,203	-462	2,632	.522
26	Florida Panthers	32	2,519	1,128	142	1,013	236	6,976	7,234	-258	2,634	.523
27	Nashville Predators	27	2,141	1,054	60	826	201	5,861	5,913	-52	2,369	.553
28	Minnesota Wild	25	1,977	988	55	734	200	5,380	5,264	+116	2,231	.564
29	Winnipeg Jets; Atlanta Thrashers (1999–2011)	26	2,061	952	45	875	189	5,860	6,227	-367	2,138	.519
30	Columbus Blue Jackets	25	1,978	847	33	890	208	5,239	5,982	-743	1,935	.489
31	Vegas Golden Knights	9	701	401	–	224	76	2,258	1,952	+306	878	.626
32	Montreal Maroons	14	622	271	91	260	–	1,474	1,405	+69	633	.509
33	Ottawa Senators (1917–1934)^{1} St. Louis Eagles (1934–1935)	17	590	269	69	252	–	1,544	1,478	+66	607	.514
34	New York Americans (1925–1941); Brooklyn Americans (1941–1942)	17	784	255	127	402	–	1,643	2,182	-539	637	.406
35	California Seals (1967); Oakland Seals (1967–1970); Bay Area Seals (1970); California Golden Seals (1970–1976); Cleveland Barons (1976–1978)	11	858	229	141	488	–	2296	3197	-901	599	.349
36	Seattle Kraken	5	410	176	–	190	44	1,185	1,287	-102	396	.483
37	Utah Mammoth	2	164	81	–	64	19	508	487	+21	181	.552
38	Pittsburgh Pirates (1925–1930); Philadelphia Quakers (1930–1931)	6	256	71	27	158	–	452	703	-251	169	.330
39	Quebec Bulldogs (1919–1920); Hamilton Tigers (1920–1925)	6	150	51	1	98	–	505	652	-147	103	.343
40	Montreal Wanderers^{1}	1	6	1	0	5	–	17	35	-18	2	.167

1. Record does not include pre-NHL results.
2. Team is currently inactive.
