= Boston Bruins =

National Hockey League team in Boston, Massachusetts

- 2026–27 Boston Bruins season
- Conference: Eastern
- Division: Atlantic
- Founded: 1924
- History: Boston Bruins; 1924–present
- Home arena: TD Garden
- City: Boston, Massachusetts
- Team colors: Black, gold, white
- Media: NESN; The Sports Hub (98.5 FM); NBC Sports Boston
- Owner(s): Delaware North (Jeremy Jacobs, chairman; Charlie Jacobs, CEO)
- General manager: Don Sweeney
- Head coach: Marco Sturm
- Captain: David Pastrňák
- Minor league affiliates: Providence Bruins (AHL); Maine Mariners (ECHL)
- Stanley Cups: 6 (1928–29, 1938–39, 1940–41, 1969–70, 1971–72, 2010–11)
- Conference championships: 5 (1987–88, 1989–90, 2010–11, 2012–13, 2018–19)
- Presidents' Trophies: 4 (1989–90, 2013–14, 2019–20, 2022–23)
- Division championships: 27 (1927–28, 1928–29, 1929–30, 1930–31, 1932–33, 1934–35, 1937–38, 1970–71, 1971–72, 1973–74, 1975–76, 1976–77, 1977–78, 1978–79, 1982–83, 1983–84, 1989–90, 1990–91, 1992–93, 2001–02, 2003–04, 2008–09, 2010–11, 2011–12, 2013–14, 2019–20, 2022–23)
- Official website: nhl.com/bruins

The Boston Bruins are a professional ice hockey team based in Boston. The Bruins compete in the National Hockey League (NHL) as a member of the Atlantic Division in the Eastern Conference. The team has been in existence since 1924, making them the third-oldest active team in the NHL, and the oldest in the United States.

The Bruins are one of the "Original Six" NHL teams, along with the Detroit Red Wings, Chicago Blackhawks, Montreal Canadiens, New York Rangers, and Toronto Maple Leafs. They have won six Stanley Cup championships, tied for fourth-most of any team with the Blackhawks (trailing the Canadiens, Maple Leafs, and Red Wings, with 24, 13, and 11, respectively), and tied for second-most for an NHL team based in the United States. The Bruins have also won the Presidents' Trophy four times, with their most recent win in 2022–23 amassing 135 points—the most in one season in NHL history.

The first facility to host the Bruins was the Boston Arena (later known as Matthews Arena), the world's oldest (built 1909–10) indoor ice hockey facility at the time of its closure in December 2025 and subsequent demolition in 2026. Following the Bruins' departure from the Boston Arena, the team played its home games at the Boston Garden for 67 seasons, beginning in 1928 and concluding in 1995, when they moved to TD Garden.

== History ==
=== Early years (1924–1942) ===
In 1924, the NHL made the decision to expand to the United States. The previous year in 1923, sports promoter Thomas Duggan received options on three NHL franchises for the United States, and sold one to Boston grocery magnate Charles Adams. The team was one of the NHL's first expansion teams, and the first NHL team to be based in the United States. Adams' first act as owner was to hire Art Ross, a former player and innovator, as general manager. Ross, with assistance from his secretary, came up with "Bruins" for a team nickname. The team's nickname also went along with the team's original uniform colors of brown and yellow, which came from Adams' grocery chain, First National Stores.

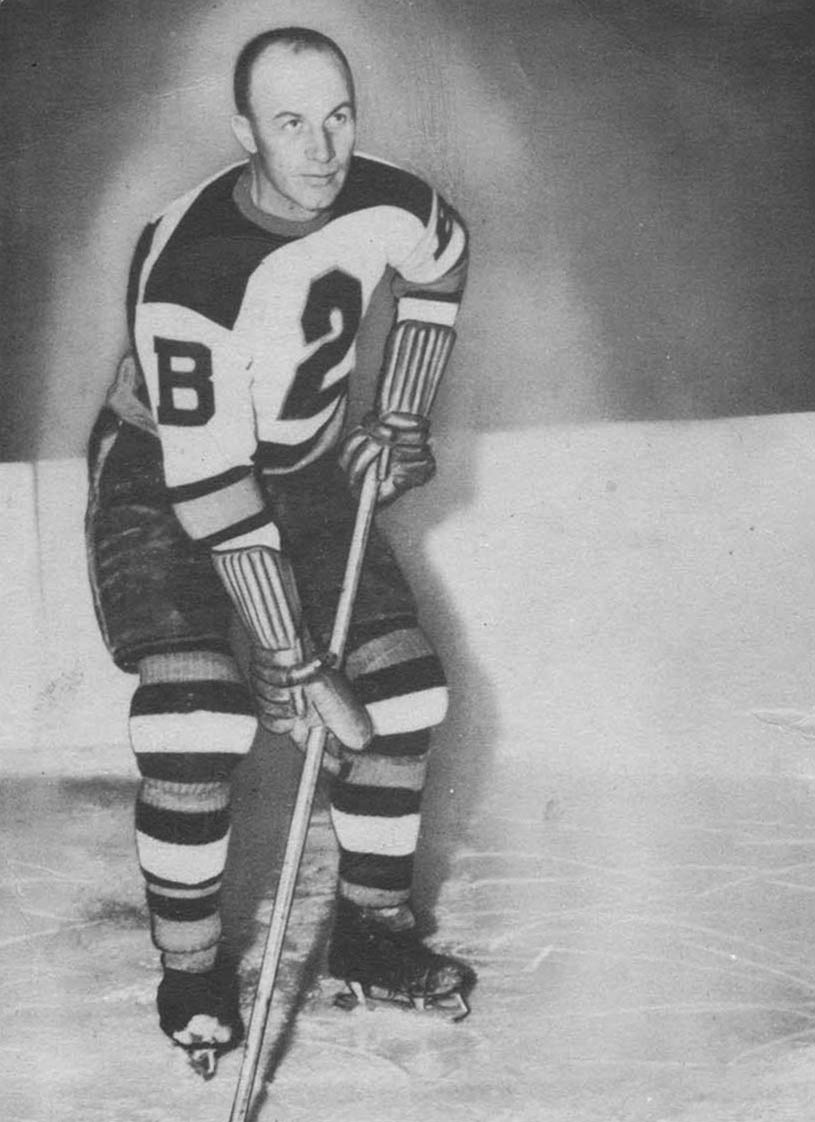
Eddie Shore as a member of the Boston Bruins.

On December 1, 1924, the Bruins won the first ever NHL game played in the United States, hosting the Montreal Maroons at Boston Arena, with Smokey Harris scoring the first-ever Bruins goal, spurring the Bruins to a 2–1 win. This would be one of the few high points of the season, as the Bruins lost their next 11 games and only managed a 6–24–0 record, finishing in last place in its first season. The Bruins played three more seasons at the Arena, after which they became the main tenant of Boston Garden.

The Bruins improved in their second season to a winning 17–15–4 record, which originally held the record for the biggest single-season improvement in NHL history. However, they missed out on the third and final playoff berth by one point to the expansion Pittsburgh Pirates.

In their third season, Ross took advantage of the collapse of the Western Hockey League (WHL) to purchase several western stars, including the team's first great star, defenseman Eddie Shore. With the Bruins, he would go on to become one of the greatest players in NHL history. Boston qualified for the then-expanded playoffs. In their first-ever playoff run, the Bruins reached the Stanley Cup Final where they lost to the Ottawa Senators. The Stanley Cup-winning game for the Senators would see Bruins' Billy Coutu attack the referee, earning him a ban from the NHL for life, the only in league history.

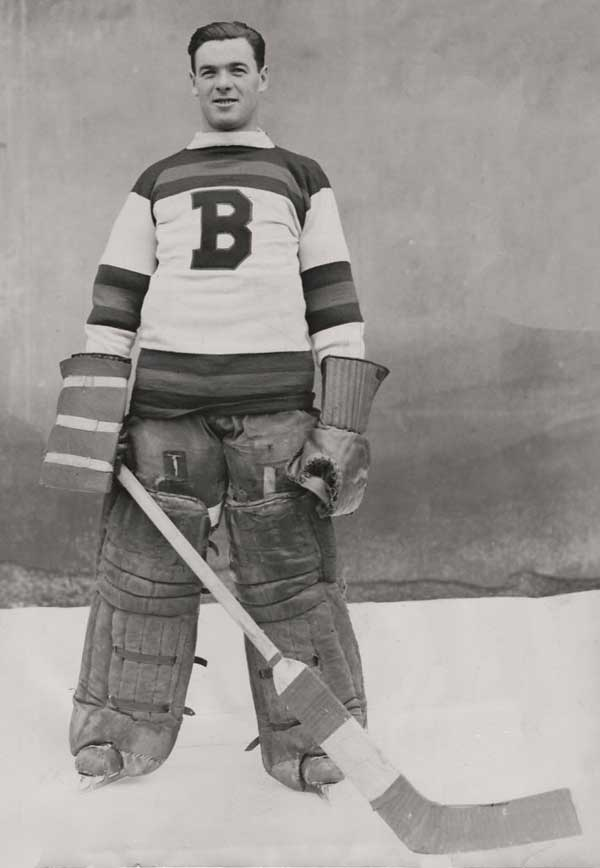
Tiny Thompson was the goaltender for the Bruins from 1928 to 1938. He helped the team win its first Stanley Cup in 1929.

The 1928–29 season was the first played at Boston Garden. It also featured the NHL debut of goaltender Tiny Thompson, who assisted the Bruins in defeating the New York Rangers to win their first Stanley Cup.

In 1929–30, the Bruins posted the best-ever regular season winning percentage in the NHL (.875, a record which still stands) because of a 38–5–1 record, but lost to the Montreal Canadiens in the Stanley Cup Final. In 1936, owner Charles Adams transferred ownership to his son Weston Adams.

In 1939, the team captured its second Stanley Cup. That year, Thompson was traded to make room for rookie goaltender Frank Brimsek. Brimsek had an award-winning season, capturing the Vezina and Calder Trophies, becoming the first rookie named to the NHL first All-Star team, and earning the nickname "Mr. Zero". The team skating in front of Brimsek included Bill Cowley, Shore, Dit Clapper and "Sudden Death" Mel Hill (who scored three overtime goals in one playoff series), together with the "Kraut line" of center Milt Schmidt, right winger Bobby Bauer and left winger Woody Dumart.

In the 1939–40 season, Shore was traded to the New York Americans for his final NHL season. In 1941, the Bruins won their third Stanley Cup after losing only eight games and finishing first in the regular season. World War II affected the Bruins more than most teams; Brimsek and the "Krauts" all enlisted in the Royal Canadian Air Force following the 1941 Cup win.

=== Original Six era (1942–1967) ===
The NHL had by 1942 been reduced, for the next 25 years, to the six teams that would come to be called the "Original Six".

In the 1943–44 season, Bruins' Herb Cain set the then-NHL record for points in a season with 82.

The stars returned from World War II for the 1945–46 season, and Clapper led the team back to the Stanley Cup Final as player-coach. He retired as a player after the next season, becoming the first player to play twenty NHL seasons. Clapper retired as a player in 1947 then retired as coach in 1949. His retirement as coach came at the same time as goalie Frank Brimsek requesting a trade, to which he was granted one on September 8, 1949.

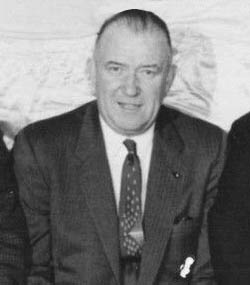
In 1951, Walter A. Brown purchased the Boston Bruins from Weston Adams.

Owner Weston Adams began facing financial trouble at the start of the 1950s. He accepted a buyout offer from Walter A. Brown, the owner of the Boston Celtics and the Garden, in 1951. The Bruins did not have regular success during this era, aside from appearances in the 1953, 1957, and 1958 Stanley Cup Final. In 1954, Art Ross retired and Lynn Patrick took over as general manager. During the 1954–55 season, an incident occurred between the Bruins and the Montreal Canadiens. Bruins defenseman Hal Laycoe high-sticked Canadiens star Maurice Richard in the head, and Richard went after Laycoe, going as far as punching a linesman to get to Laycoe. Following his removal from the game, the Montreal fans began to riot, only calming down after Richard told them to. On June 3, 1955, the Bruins completed a nine-player trade with the Detroit Red Wings to acquire goaltender Terry Sawchuk as well as forward Marcel Bonin. However, Sawchuk's playing ability would be affected after contracting infectious mononucleosis and he would quit hockey midway through the 1956–57 season. On June 10, 1957, Sawchuk was dealt back to the Red Wings in exchange for Johnny Bucyk.

On January 18, 1958, the first-ever black NHL player, Willie O'Ree, stepped onto the ice for the Bruins. He played in 45 games for the Bruins over the 1957–58 and 1960–61 seasons. The "Uke Line"—named for the Ukrainian heritage of Johnny Bucyk, Vic Stasiuk, and Bronco Horvath—was formed in 1957 and enjoyed four seasons together until Stasiuk's trade to the Red Wings in 1961.

At the 1964 NHL amateur draft, the Bruins drafted Ken Dryden, but traded his rights to the Montreal Canadiens in exchange for two prospects. In 1966, head coach Milt Schmidt took over as general manager as Lynn Patrick retired.

=== Expansion and the Big Bad Bruins (1967–1979) ===
Weston Adams took back ownership the Bruins in 1964 after Brown's death. Adams signed future superstar defenseman Bobby Orr, who entered the league in 1966. Orr was that season's winner of the Calder Memorial Trophy for Rookie of the Year and named to the second NHL All-Star Team. Despite Orr's stellar rookie season, the Bruins would miss the playoffs.

The next season, Boston made the playoffs for the first of 29 consecutive seasons, an all-time record. The Bruins then obtained forwards Phil Esposito, Ken Hodge and Fred Stanfield from Chicago in a deal celebrated as one of the most one-sided in hockey history. Esposito, who centered a line with Hodge and Wayne Cashman, became the league's top goal scorer and the first NHL player to break the 100-point mark. With other stars like forwards Bucyk, John McKenzie, Derek Sanderson, and Hodge, defenders like Dallas Smith and goaltender Gerry Cheevers, the "Big Bad Bruins" became one of the league's top teams from the late 1960s into the 1980s.

In 1970, a 29-year Stanley Cup drought came to an end in Boston as the Bruins defeated the St. Louis Blues in four games in the 1970 Stanley Cup Final. Orr scored the game-winning goal in overtime to clinch the Stanley Cup. The same season was Orr's most awarded; he won his third of eight consecutive Norris Trophies as the top defenseman in the NHL, the Art Ross Trophy, the Conn Smythe Trophy, and the Hart Memorial Trophy, the only player to win those four awards in the same season.

While head coach Harry Sinden temporarily retired from ice hockey before the 1970–71 season to enter business (he was replaced by ex-Bruins and Canadiens defenseman Tom Johnson), the Bruins continued to dominate the league. They had seven of the league's top ten scorers (a feat not achieved before or since), set the record for wins in a season, and in a league that had never seen a 100-point scorer before the 1968–69 season, the Bruins had four that year. All four (Orr, Esposito, Bucyk and Hodge) were named First Team All-Stars. Boston was favored to repeat as Cup champions but lost to the Ken Dryden-led Canadiens in seven games.

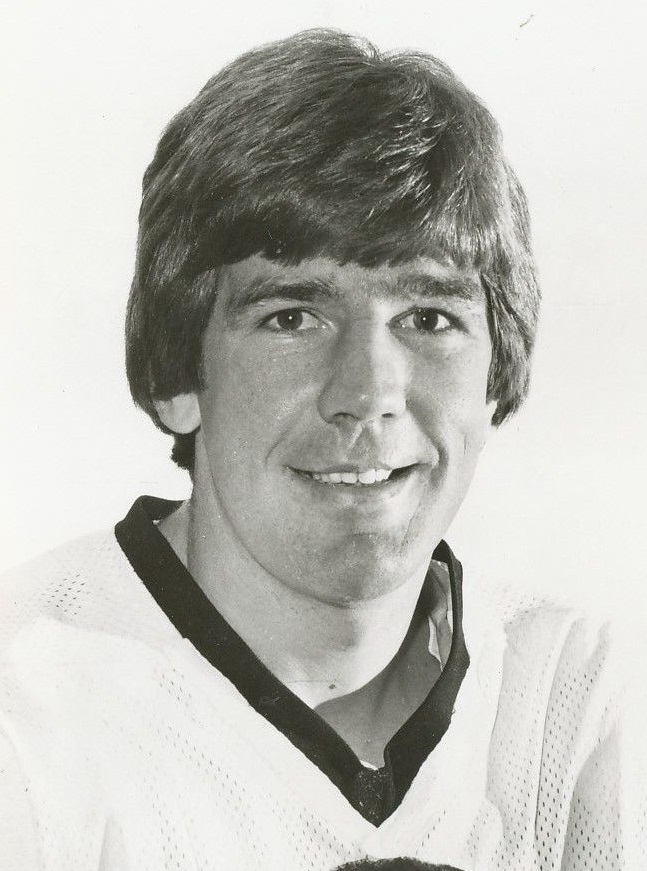
Terry O'Reilly was drafted by the Bruins 14th overall in the 1971 draft. He played his entire career with the Bruins from 1971 to 1985.

While the Bruins were not as dominant the next season, Esposito and Orr finished first and second in the scoring standings and Boston regained the Stanley Cup by defeating the New York Rangers in six games in the 1972 Stanley Cup Final. The 1972–73 season saw upheaval for the Bruins. Former head coach Sinden became the general manager. Bruins players Gerry Cheevers, Derek Sanderson, Johnny McKenzie, and Ted Green left to join the World Hockey Association (WHA). Coach Tom Johnson was fired 52 games into the season, replaced by Bep Guidolin. The Adams family, which had owned the team since its founding in the 1920s, sold it to Storer Broadcasting. The Bruins' season came to a premature end in a first-round loss to the Rangers in the 1973 playoffs. In 1974, the Bruins regained their first-place standing in the regular season, along with another 100-point season from Orr, his fifth consecutive. However, they lost the 1974 Stanley Cup Final in an upset to the Philadelphia Flyers.

Don Cherry stepped behind the bench as the new coach in 1974–75. The Bruins stocked themselves with enforcers and grinders, and remained competitive under Cherry's reign, the so-called "Lunch Pail A.C"., behind players such as Gregg Sheppard, Terry O'Reilly, Stan Jonathan and Peter McNab. The Bruins placed second in the Adams Division, and lost to the Chicago Black Hawks in the first round of the 1975 playoffs, losing a best-of-three series, two games to one.

Prior to the 1975–76 season, Sportsystem Corporation, composed of current owner Jeremy Jacobs and his two brothers, purchased the Bruins. Continuing with Sinden's rebuilding of the team, the Bruins traded Esposito and Carol Vadnais to the Rangers for Brad Park, Jean Ratelle, and Joe Zanussi. The Bruins made the semifinals again, but lost to the Flyers. Orr left as a free agent to Chicago in the offseason.

Before the 1976–77 season, the Bruins completed another trade with the Rangers acquiring Rick Middleton for Hodge. Later in the season, Cheevers returned, and the Bruins defeated the Flyers in the semifinals, but were swept by the Canadiens in the Stanley Cup Final. The story repeated itself in 1978—with a balanced attack that saw Boston have 11 players with 20+ goal seasons, still the NHL record—as the Bruins made the Cup Final once more, but lost in six games to Montreal. After that series, John Bucyk retired, holding virtually every Bruins' career longevity and scoring mark to that time.

The 1979 semifinals series against the Canadiens proved to be Cherry's undoing. In the deciding seventh game, the Bruins, up by a goal, were called for having too many men on the ice in the late stages of the third period. Montreal tied the game on the ensuing power play and won in overtime. Cherry was dismissed as head coach thereafter.

=== Ray Bourque era (1979–2000) ===
The 1979–80 season saw a new head coach Fred Creighton. It also included a trade of goaltender Ron Grahame to the Los Angeles Kings for a first-round pick, which was used to select Ray Bourque, one of the greatest defensemen of all-time and the face of the Bruins for over two decades. During this season, an incident between forward Mike Milbury and a fan at a New York Rangers game occurred when Milbury, along with other Bruins players, entered the stands to engage some of the fans. During the fray, Milbury managed to take off the shoe of a fan and slap him with the heel-end. The incident became known as the Shoe Incident. Creighton was fired with only 15 days remaining in the season due to poor chemistry with general manager Harry Sinden. Sinden hired former goaltender Gerry Cheevers as the next head coach. They had the league's best record in 1982–83 behind a Vezina Trophy-winning season from ex-Flyers goaltender Pete Peeters, but fell short of making the Stanley Cup Final.

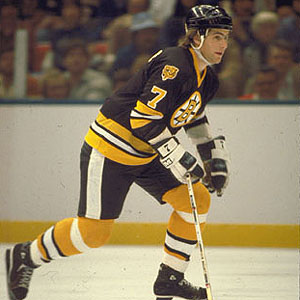
Ray Bourque, shown in 1981 and before switching to his familiar no. 77, led the Bruins to the Stanley Cup Final in 1988 and 1990.

Following a slow start to the 1986–87 season, Sinden fired head coach Butch Goring and replaced him with Terry O'Reilly. At the 1987 NHL entry draft, the Bruins made a trade with the Vancouver Canucks, moving Barry Pederson for right wing Cam Neely. In March 1988, the Bruins acquired the rights to Andy Moog from the Edmonton Oilers in exchange for Geoff Courtnall, Bill Ranford, and future considerations. Bourque and Neely led the Bruins to a Stanley Cup Final appearance in 1988 against the Edmonton Oilers, but Boston lost in a four-game sweep.

Throughout the 1980s, the Bruins often matched up with the Canadiens in either the division semifinals or division finals, with Montreal defeating them five of the six series. In the 1987–88 season, the Bruins defeated their rivals, the Canadiens in the playoffs en route to their 1988 Stanley Cup Final appearance. It was their first playoff series victory over the Canadiens since 1943, breaking 18 consecutive losses to them. Following the 1988–89 season, O'Reilly resigned as head coach to care for his son. Milbury became the head coach soon after.

Under Milbury, and with the play of Neely, Bourque, Craig Janney, Bobby Carpenter, rookie Don Sweeney, and goaltender Andy Moog, Boston returned to the Stanley Cup Final in 1990, but again lost to the Oilers, this time in five games. Following Boston's loss to the Pittsburgh Penguins in the 1991 Prince of Wales Conference final, Milbury resigned as head coach, staying with the team as assistant GM. His replacement, Rick Bowness only coached one season, taking the Bruins to the conference final for the second consecutive season against the Penguins, before his firing after the playoffs. During the 1991–92 season, the Bruins acquired Adam Oates in a trade with the Blues for Craig Janney.

Brian Sutter was hired as the head coach going into the 1992–93 season, which also saw Oates score 142 points. Despite finishing with the second-best regular season record after Pittsburgh, Boston was swept in the first round by the Buffalo Sabres—Boston had won all five previous playoff series against Buffalo. The league realigned into different divisions heading into the 1993–94 NHL season; the Bruins were placed into the Northeast Division. In the 1994 playoffs, the Bruins were defeated by the New Jersey Devils in the conference semifinals.

The 1994–95 season was the Bruins' last at the Boston Garden. The final official match played in the Garden was a 3–2 loss to the New Jersey Devils in the 1995 playoffs; the Bruins went on to play the final game at the old arena on September 26, 1995, in an exhibition matchup against the Canadiens. They subsequently moved into the FleetCenter, now known as the TD Garden. Prior to the 1995–96 NHL season, Sutter was fired and replaced by Steve Kasper. Ranford was traded back to the Bruins in the 1995–96 season, but in the 1996 playoffs, the Bruins lost their first-round series to the Florida Panthers in five games.

The team did not fare well in the 1996–97 season as they fell to last place in the NHL and Boston missed the playoffs for the first time in 30 years (and for the first time in the expansion era), which set the North American major professional record for most consecutive seasons in the playoffs. With the frustration of the season, Oates said of upper management, "The guys upstairs aren't doing their jobs.... We're not good enough." During the season, they also traded Oates, Ranford, and Rick Tocchet for Jason Allison, Jim Carey, Anson Carter, and two draft picks. Head coach Kasper was fired after the season. The Bruins selected Joe Thornton with the first overall pick in the 1997 NHL entry draft. Pat Burns was hired as head coach in the offseason. He won the Jack Adams Award for coach of the year in the 1997–98 season. However, the Bruins lost in the first round of the 1998 playoffs to the Washington Capitals in six games. In the 1999 playoffs, the Bruins defeated the Carolina Hurricanes in six games during the first round. However, they lost to the Sabres in six games in the second round of the playoffs.

=== The new millennium (2000–2015) ===
In the 1999–2000 season, the Bruins finished in last place in the Northeast Division and failed to qualify for the playoffs. During a game between the Bruins and the Vancouver Canucks on February 21, 2000, Marty McSorley was ejected for using his stick to hit Canucks forward Donald Brashear in the head, and subsequently suspended for what resulted in the rest of his career. McSorley was later charged and convicted for assault and sentenced to 18 months probation. Bourque requested a trade to a playoff contender and on March 6, 2000, he was traded to the Colorado Avalanche.

Although the team started the 2000–01 season 3–0–1, after losing four consecutive games, the Bruins fired coach Pat Burns in favor of Mike Keenan. Following Keenan's hiring, Sinden stepped down as general manager, opting to stay as team president. Mike O'Connell took over as general manager. Despite a 15-point improvement over the previous season, they did not make the playoffs and Keenan was let go.

Robbie Ftorek was hired as the head coach prior to the start of the 2001–02 season. The Bruins won their first Northeast Division title since 1993. They lost in six games to the Montreal Canadiens in the first round of the playoffs. Joe Thornton was made team captain prior to the 2002–03 season. During the regular season, he led the team in scoring with 101 points. Head coach Ftorek was fired with nine games remaining in the season and general manager Mike O'Connell took over in interim and into the playoffs, losing to the eventual Stanley Cup champion New Jersey Devils in five games. Mike Sullivan made his head coaching debut for the upcoming 2003–04 season. At the 2003 NHL entry draft, the Bruins drafted Patrice Bergeron; he made his debut on October 7, 2003. The Bruins won another division title in 2004 and gained a 3–1 series lead on the Canadiens in the first round of the playoffs. However, the Canadiens rallied back to win three consecutive games, upsetting the Bruins.

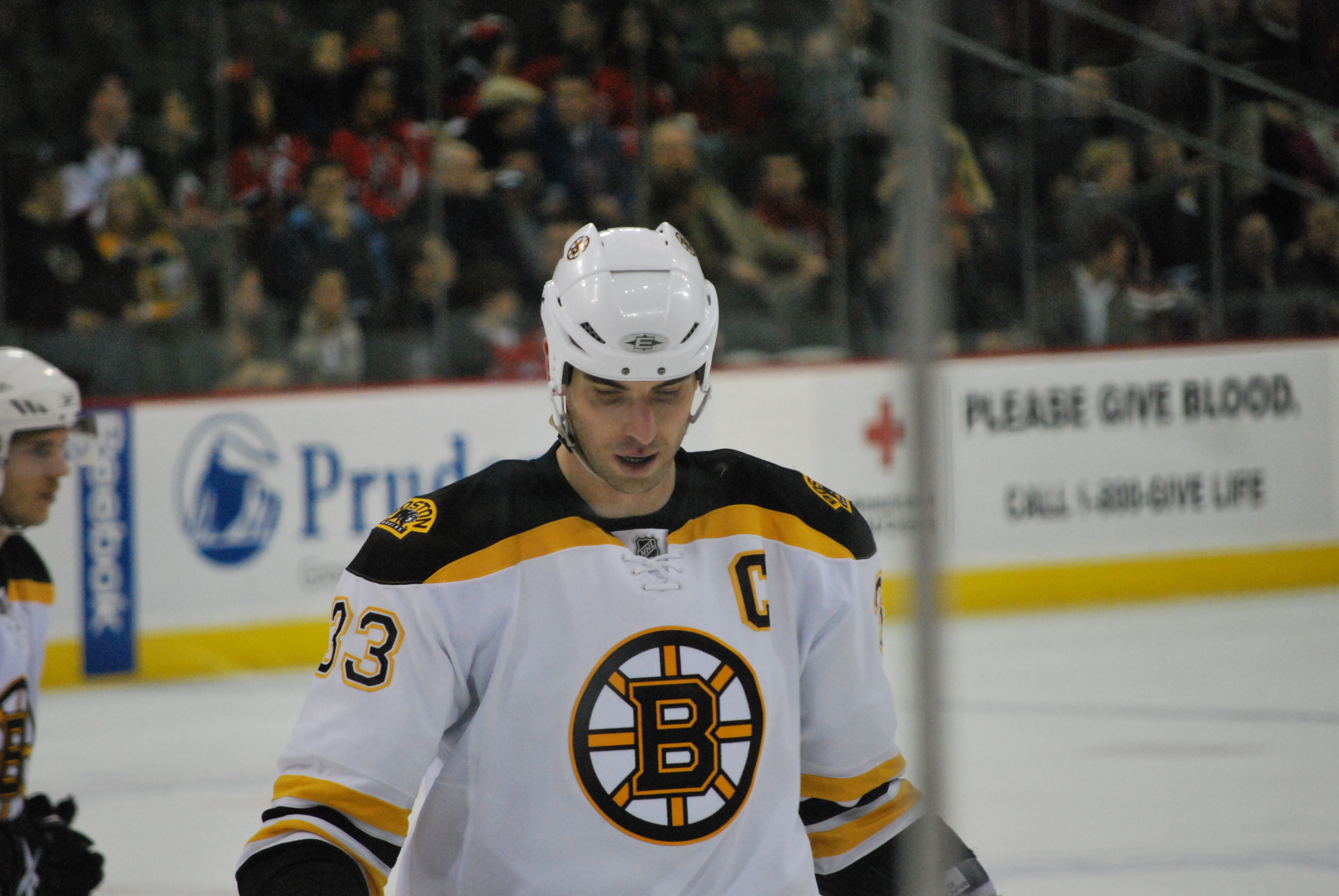
The Bruins acquired Zdeno Chára on July 1, 2006, naming him the new team captain.

Prior to the 2004–05 NHL lockout, the team drafted David Krejčí at the 2004 draft. On November 30, 2005, the Bruins traded Thornton to the San Jose Sharks for Marco Sturm, Wayne Primeau, and Brad Stuart. However, the Bruins struggled to stay consistent throughout the season and with very few transactions to make the team better, Mike O'Connell was fired. Assistant general manager Jeff Gorton took over as interim GM.

The 2006–07 offseason came with significant front office shake up as Peter Chiarelli was hired as the new general manager of the team on May 26, 2006. Head coach Mike Sullivan was fired and Dave Lewis, former coach of the Detroit Red Wings, was hired to replace him. Sinden, who was team president, resigned on August 9 to become advisor to the owner. At the entry draft, the Bruins selected with the fifth overall pick, Phil Kessel. The Bruins signed defenseman Zdeno Chára and center Marc Savard. Boston also traded Andrew Raycroft for goalie prospect Tuukka Rask. The 2006–07 season ended with the team finishing in last place in the division.

In the offseason, Lewis was fired as coach and replaced by Claude Julien. The 2007–08 campaign saw the NHL debut of Milan Lucic as well as the Bruins finishing 41–29–12 and making the playoffs, but at the cost of Bergeron missing most of the season with a concussion. The Bruins faced off against their rival Canadiens in another first round matchup. Although the Bruins came back from a 3–1 series deficit to tie the series, they were shut out in game seven by Montreal.

After a slow start to the 2008–09 season, the Bruins went on to have the best record in the Eastern Conference and qualified for the playoffs for the fifth time in nine years. At the trade deadline, they acquired Mark Recchi from the Tampa Bay Lightning. They faced the Canadiens in the playoffs for the fourth time during that span, defeating Montreal in four games before losing in seven games to the Carolina Hurricanes in the conference semifinals. Goaltender Tim Thomas won the Vezina Trophy as the league's top goaltender in the season. Julien was also awarded the Jack Adams Trophy as coach of the year.

Prior to the start of the 2009–10 season, Kessel was traded to the Toronto Maple Leafs in exchange for a 2010 and 2011 first round draft pick along with a 2010 second round draft pick. On January 1, 2010, the Bruins won the 2010 Winter Classic over the Philadelphia Flyers in a 2–1 overtime decision at Fenway Park, thus becoming the first home team to win an outdoor classic game. In the playoffs, they faced off against the Buffalo Sabres in the conference quarterfinals and emerged victorious in six games. In the conference semifinals, they gained a 3–0 series lead over the Philadelphia Flyers. However, they lost the next three games and were forced into game seven. They had a 3–0 lead in the game, but the Flyers came back in the game to defeat the Bruins; Boston to become the third team in NHL history to give up a 3–0 series lead.

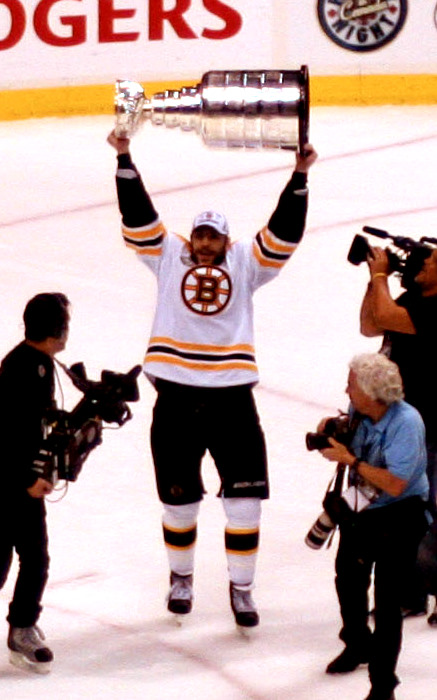
Milan Lucic with the Stanley Cup after the Bruins defeated the Vancouver Canucks in game seven of the 2011 Stanley Cup Final.

Due to the Kessel trade and Toronto's poor performance in the 2009–10 season, the Bruins were able to use Toronto's pick and select second overall in the 2010 NHL entry draft. They used the pick to select Tyler Seguin. In the 2011 Stanley Cup playoffs, the Bruins eliminated the Montreal Canadiens in seven games in the conference quarterfinals. On May 6, the Bruins swept the Philadelphia Flyers in four games to advance to the conference finals for the first time since 1992. Boston then defeated the Tampa Bay Lightning in seven games and advanced to the Stanley Cup Final for the first time since 1990 to face the Vancouver Canucks. In the Final, the home team won each game, with Boston dominating their home games against the Canucks, until game seven, which they won in Vancouver 4–0 to win their sixth Stanley Cup. Tim Thomas won the Conn Smythe Trophy as MVP of the playoffs setting an NHL record with 798 saves made across the playoffs. Thomas also led the league in save percentage with .938, eclipsing Dominik Hašek's record of .937, which earned him his second Vezina Trophy.

Following their Stanley Cup win, Mark Recchi retired. At the 2012 NHL entry draft, the Bruins used the other first round pick in the Kessel trade to select defenseman Dougie Hamilton. The Bruins went on to finish second in the Eastern Conference with 102 points, winning the Northeast Division title, but losing to the Washington Capitals in the first round of the 2012 Stanley Cup playoffs in seven games.

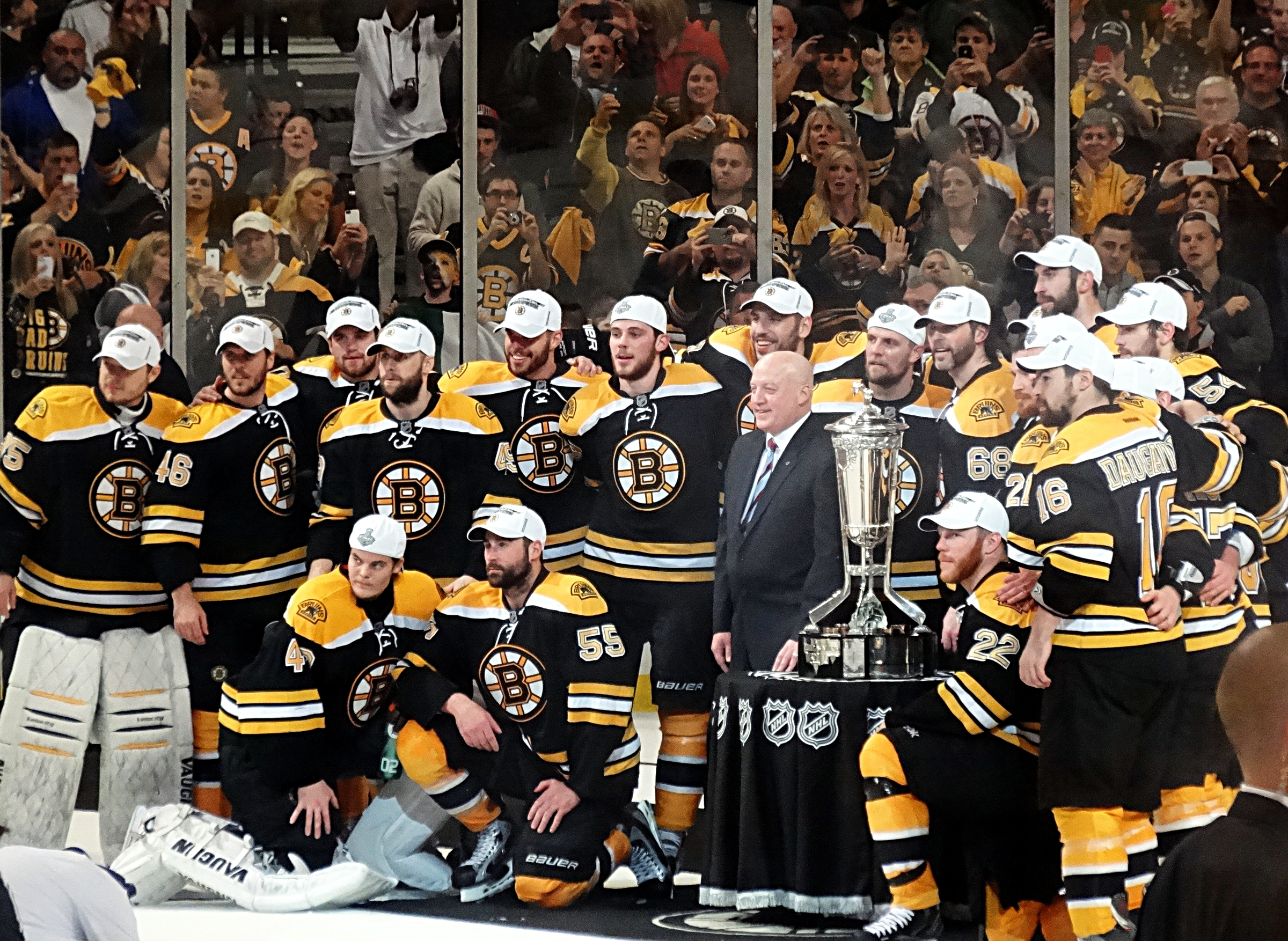
The Bruins were the 2013 Eastern Conference champions, their second Conference title in three years.

During the offseason preceding the 2012–13 NHL lockout, Tim Thomas made his decision to sit out the 2012–13 season; his rights were traded to the New York Islanders on February 7, 2013. Following the Boston Marathon bombing, the game they had on the next day (April 16, 2013) was postponed. On April 17, the Bruins faced off against the Sabres, Boston's first major sporting event since the bombing. At the end of the game both the Sabres players and Bruins players raised their sticks in a salute. In the opening round of the 2013 playoffs, the Bruins took on the Toronto Maple Leafs. Although the Maple Leafs forced game seven after the Bruins were up 3–1 in the series, Boston defeated Toronto by coming back from a 4–1 deficit in the third period of the game to win in overtime. They went on to beat the New York Rangers in five games and the Pittsburgh Penguins in a four-game sweep to advance to the Stanley Cup Final. However, the Chicago Blackhawks were victorious in the Final, defeating the Bruins in six games.

On July 4, 2013, the Bruins completed a blockbuster trade, sending Tyler Seguin along with Rich Peverley and a prospect to the Dallas Stars for Loui Eriksson and three prospects. Amidst the trade, general manager Chiarelli said Seguin needed to "become more of a professional." In the 2013–14 season, the Bruins won the Presidents' Trophy after finishing first in the newly formed Atlantic Division with a record of 54–19–9 for 117 points. However, their regular season success would not translate into another conference finals appearance. Despite winning their first-round series against the Detroit Red Wings, the team fell to the Canadiens in seven games in the second round during the 2014 playoffs.

In the 2014–15 season, the Bruins finished with a record of 41–27–14 for 96 points, missing out on the playoffs by just two points. The Bruins became only the third team to miss the playoffs after winning the Presidents' Trophy in the previous season. The 96 points they earned that season broke the record for the most points earned by a team that did not make the playoffs.

=== Don Sweeney era (2015–present) ===
On April 15, 2015, Peter Chiarelli was fired by the Boston Bruins. On May 20, the Bruins named former player Don Sweeney as the team's new general manager for the 2015–16 season. Part of Sweeney's offseason moves included trading Milan Lucic to the Los Angeles Kings in exchange for goalie Martin Jones, forward Colin Miller, and a 2015 first round draft pick. The Bruins would flip Jones to the San Jose Sharks four days later for Sean Kuraly and a 2016 first round pick. The Bruins played in the 2016 NHL Winter Classic against the Canadiens, but lost 5–1. One all-time franchise achievement the Bruins attained in the 2015–16 season is shared by only their greatest rival, the Canadiens – a total of 3,000 wins in the team's existence, achieved by the Bruins on January 8, 2016, in a 4–1 road victory against the New Jersey Devils. For the first time since the two seasons following the 2004–05 lockout, the Bruins did not qualify for the playoffs in two consecutive seasons.

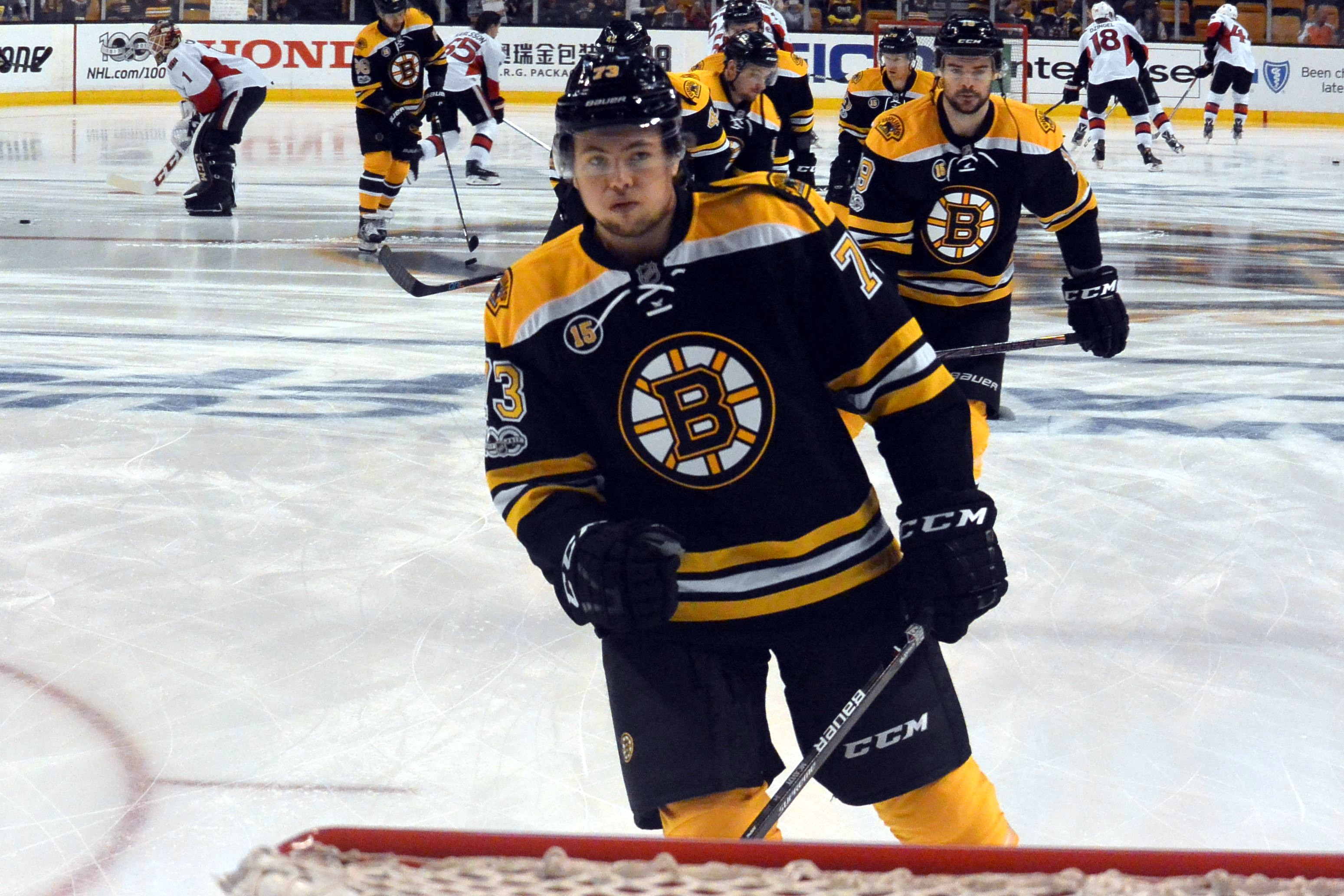
Charlie McAvoy and other players warming up prior to a game in the 2017 Stanley Cup playoffs. The Bruins qualified for the Stanley Cup playoffs for the first time since 2014.

During the last two months of the 2016–17 regular season, the Bruins fired head coach Claude Julien and promoted Bruce Cassidy to interim coach. Under Cassidy, the Bruins achieved an 18–8–1 record through their remaining regular season games, finishing third in the Atlantic Division and qualifying for the playoffs for the first time since the 2013–14 season. In the first round of the playoffs, the Bruins lost to the Ottawa Senators in six games.

Cassidy returned as head coach for the 2017–18 season, leading the Bruins to the playoffs for a consecutive season. They had a record of 50–20–12, including an 18-game point streak, which lasted from December 14, 2017, to January 25, 2018. They defeated the Toronto Maple Leafs in the first round in seven games, but lost to the Lightning in five games in the second round. The season also saw the debuts of Jake DeBrusk and Charlie McAvoy. The Bruins also acquired veteran Rick Nash trading out Ryan Spooner, Matt Beleskey, Ryan Lindgren, and two draft picks.

During the 2018–19 season the Bruins finished the regular season in second place in the division with a 49–24–9 overall record. During the trade deadline, the team acquired Charlie Coyle and Marcus Johansson. In the first round of the 2019 Stanley Cup playoffs, they faced the Maple Leafs again, defeating them in seven games. In a six-game series, the Bruins defeated the Columbus Blue Jackets in the second round and advanced to the conference finals for the first time since 2013. The Bruins won the conference finals by sweeping out the Carolina Hurricanes in four games, thus winning the Prince of Wales Trophy and advancing to the 2019 Stanley Cup Final for the third time in 10 years. They faced the St. Louis Blues in a rematch of the 1970 Stanley Cup Final. However, this time the Blues emerged victorious, winning in seven games.That would be the second Stanley Cup lost by goaltender Tuukka Rask.

During the 2019–20 season, the Bruins consistently had the best record in the Atlantic Division and were near the top of the league. During the trade deadline, they acquired Ondřej Kaše and Nick Ritchie, both from the Anaheim Ducks, in two separate trades. On March 12, 2020, the NHL season was paused due to the COVID-19 pandemic. At the time of the pause, the Bruins were first overall in the league, with 100 points. On May 26, Commissioner Gary Bettman announced that the 2019–20 regular season was completed and that the league would resume with the playoffs. The Bruins were awarded the Presidents' Trophy for the second time in a decade, while David Pastrňák's 48 goals made him the first Bruin to win the Maurice "Rocket" Richard Trophy, which he shared with Alexander Ovechkin. During the 2020 Stanley Cup playoffs, the Bruins won the first round against the Carolina Hurricanes in five games, but lost to the Tampa Bay Lightning in the second round, also in five games.

Prior to the beginning of the 2020–21 season, Zdeno Chára left as a free agent, signing with the Washington Capitals. Patrice Bergeron was named captain shortly afterwards. As they neared the trade deadline, the Bruins made a trade with the Buffalo Sabres for Taylor Hall and Curtis Lazar. The Bruins made the 2021 playoffs, where they defeated the Capitals in five games, but lost to the New York Islanders in six games. In the 2021–22 offseason, goaltender Tuukka Rask opted to undergo hip surgery.. To offset the goaltender loss, they signed free agent Linus Ullmark. However, after signing a one-year deal in January 2022, Rask retired in February. The Bruins clinched the 2022 playoffs as the first wild card team but were defeated by the Hurricanes in seven games. Following the season, head coach Cassidy was fired. They then hired Jim Montgomery, previously the head coach of the Dallas Stars, as their next head coach.

During the 2022–23 season, the Bruins broke NHL records and led the Atlantic Division for the entire season. First, they set an NHL record for longest home winning streak from the start of a season (14) from October 15 to December 3. Then on March 2, 2023, the Bruins recorded their 100th standings point of the season in their 61st game, becoming the fastest team to 100 points in NHL history, and surpassing the record previously held by the 1976–77 Montreal Canadiens. Nine days later, they set an all-time NHL record as the fastest team to achieve 50 wins, hitting the mark in 64 games compared to a previous record of 66 games held jointly by the 1995–96 Detroit Red Wings and 2018–19 Tampa Bay Lightning. In that same game, the Bruins became the third-fastest team in history to clinch a playoff spot during the era of 82-game seasons, trailing only the 1995–96 Detroit Red Wings (59 games) and the 1998–99 Dallas Stars (63 games). On April 9, 2023, the Bruins set the new all-time record for most games won in a season (63), when they defeated the Philadelphia Flyers. Two days later, the Bruins set the new all-time single-season points record (133), when they defeated the Capitals, and they finished the season with 65 wins and 135 points. The Bruins lost to the Florida Panthers in seven games in the opening round of the 2023 Stanley Cup playoffs after giving up a 3–1 series lead. Hall was traded after the season, and both Patrice Bergeron and David Krejčí retired.

With Brad Marchand as captain for the 2023–24 season, the Bruins finished in second place in the Atlantic Division with 109 points. Lucic also returned to the team on a one-year contract. However, after an injury to his ankle placed him on long-term injured reserve, and an ensuing domestic assault charge, he played no more than four games in the season. In the first round of the 2024 playoffs, the Bruins eliminated their rival, the Toronto Maple Leafs, in seven games. In the second round, they were eliminated by the eventual Stanley Cup champion Florida Panthers again, this time in six games.

In the 2024–25 season, the Bruins fired Jim Montgomery amidst a slow start and named Joe Sacco as interim head coach. They traded captain Marchand to the Panthers for a first round pick. They finished in last place in both the Atlantic Division and the Eastern Conference and missed the playoffs for the first time since 2016. Ahead of the 2025–26 season, the Bruins replaced Joe Sacco with Marco Sturm, making him the 30th head coach in Boston Bruins history. It was also the first full season since the 2001–02 season that the Bruins had a vacant captaincy, instead naming David Pastrňák, Charlie McAvoy, and Hampus Lindholm as their three alternate captains. On April 11, 2026, the Bruins clinched a spot in the 2026 playoffs, and were eliminated by the Buffalo Sabres in six games in the first round.

== Team information ==
=== Logo and uniforms ===
The original version of the "Spoked B" logo.

Since 1948, the Bruins' logo is an eight-spoked, black and gold wheel with the letter "B" in the center, a nod to Boston's nickname of "The Hub". The logo has been tweaked numerous times over the course of its history. The general design, in use since 1949, features the circle and "B" in black with gold spokes; black borders and a gold outer circle were added in 1995 and serifs on the "B" were added in 2007. The black borders were removed as part of a logo update in 2025, and a corresponding gold "B" version was added for use in dark backgrounds. The block "B" logo itself preceded the "Spoked B" and was later modified to include serifs as part of their third jersey.

The Bruins have also used an alternate logo featuring a walking bear surrounded by the full team name. The logo was first used from 1924 to 1932, and a modernized version was adopted as the team's secondary logo in 2007. This was then updated in 2025 to feature only the bear itself, with the team name variation used on the black uniform, and the city name variation on the white uniform.

The Bruins' colors were originally brown and gold. They wore brown uniforms in their maiden season, but switched to a white uniform with alternating brown and gold stripes the next season. The uniforms were paired with beige pants and either gold or white socks. After the 1932 season the walking bear logo was replaced with a simple block "B" logo.

Starting with the 1935–36 season, the Bruins replaced brown with black, while also sporting gold socks full-time. The "B" logo moved to the sleeves while the uniform number occupied the front. Black pants also replaced the beige pants.

For a majority of the 1940s, the Bruins sported gold numbers on the white uniform. From 1940 to 1944 they also wore a gold uniform with a script "Bruins" wordmark in front. To commemorate their 25th anniversary, the Bruins released a new white uniform featuring the first iteration of the "Spoked B" logo. The gold "B" on the logo was drawn inside a black-spoked wheel, with "24" and "49" added to represent the foundation year and the franchise's 25th year respectively. They also debuted a black uniform with the block "B" logo in front.

Beginning in 1949, the "B" on the "Spoked B" logo was changed to block lettering. They also brought back the black numbers. With a few cosmetic changes in the stripes and yoke along with the addition of the primitive bear head logo in 1977, the Bruins kept this overall design until 1995.

In 1955, the Bruins brought the "Spoked B" logo over to the black uniform; they also released a gold jersey with the "Spoked B" in front. The black uniform crest would feature an inverse version of the "Spoked B", with the gold and black elements reversed, while the gold uniform featured the same logo but in a black circle. During this period, the gold jersey was used as the primary dark uniform while relegating the black uniform (updated with white numbers) into alternate status for several seasons. Also, for a few games between 1958 and 1965, the Bruins wore gold pants.

In 1967, the Bruins retired the gold uniforms and reinstated the black uniforms with gold numbers. As with the white uniforms, they endured several small changes until 1995. The gold socks, which had numerous striping modifications since 1934, was briefly retired in favor of wearing white socks full-time. It was brought back for the 1969–70 season and would be paired with the regular black uniforms for the next 47 seasons.

Starting with the 1995–96 season, the Bruins released a new uniform set, featuring the updated "Spoked B" logo. The primary uniforms featured a thick contrasting stripe that extended from sleeve to sleeve. In addition, a gold third jersey was released, featuring the infamous "Pooh Bear" logo (an homage to Winnie the Pooh). The gold thirds were used until 2006, after which the Bruins wore throwback black uniforms based on the 1970s design.

The version of the "Spoked B" logo used from 2007 to 2025.

Moving to the Reebok Edge template in 2007, the Bruins unveiled new uniforms with the serifed "Spoked B" logo. The overall design borrowed a few elements from the 1970s uniforms, and also unveiled a new rendition of the original walking bear logo on the shoulders. The following season, they released new black third jerseys with the aforementioned bear logo in front and the "Spoked B" logo on the shoulders.

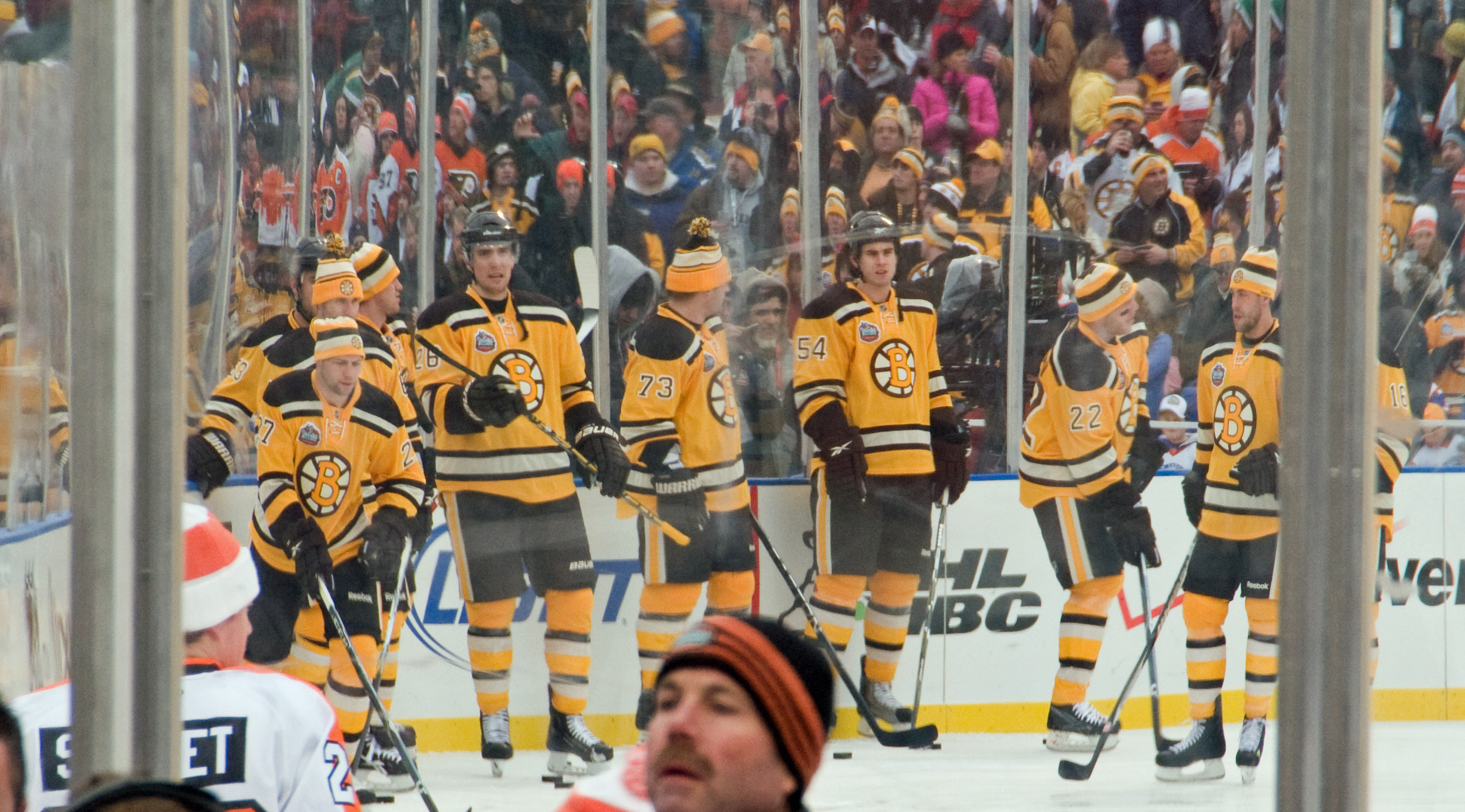
Several Boston Bruins wearing their 2010 Winter Classic jerseys.

For the 2010 Winter Classic, the Bruins wore a brown and gold variation of the 1948–49 design. Then for the 2016 Winter Classic, the Bruins wore a black and gold variation of the original brown uniforms, a design they carried over the following season as an alternate.

The Bruins kept much of the same design upon moving to Adidas' AdiZero template in 2017. However, the black uniforms were now paired with black socks, a feature previously reserved on the alternate black uniforms.

For the 2019 Winter Classic, the Bruins wore white uniforms with brown and gold stripes and the "B" logo in front, paying homage to the mid-1930s uniforms. The simple "B" logo also adorned their new black alternate uniform, which was unveiled in the 2019–20 season and paid homage to the team's 1950s uniforms.

Prior to the 2020–21 season, Adidas released its "Reverse Retro" series of alternate uniforms, which were alternate color renditions of throwback uniform designs. The Bruins' version was taken from the team's 1977 to 1995 design, but with a gold base and black accents. A second "Reverse Retro" uniform was released in the 2022–23 season, this time featuring a white version of the 1995–2006 "Pooh Bear" alternates.

Boston's 2023 Winter Classic uniform mixed various styles from the team's uniform history. The black-based uniform featured gold stripes and vintage white letters. The "BOSTON" wordmark was inspired by the 1949 "Spoked B" logo, and the original bear head logo from 1977 to 1995 was positioned below.

For the 2023–24 centennial season, the Bruins unveiled a new set of uniforms, along with a commemorative logo featuring the modern "Spoked B", minus the gold outer circle and black borders on the spokes and "B", closely resembling the original design worn from 1949 to 1995. The white uniform would feature the aforementioned logo, while the black uniform would feature an inverted version, with the "B" and circle in gold with black spokes. The gold used on the primary uniforms is a paler shade called "Centennial gold" rather than the traditional yellow gold; the yellow gold version remained in use for promotional purposes. In addition, the three gold stripes on each sleeve represented the six Stanley Cups the team has won, which are accented with thin black and thick white stripes. White numbers returned to the black uniform for the first time since the early 1960s and names featured no additional trim. An alternate beige uniform was also released. This design featured a modern take on the first "Spoked B" logo worn during the 1948–49 25th anniversary season, modified to include the foundation year "1924" along the horizontal spoke. The uniform heavily borrowed elements from the 1967–1974 uniforms which featured a gold yoke, but with brown and white trim. The brown-accented alternates were worn in all home games against Original Six teams, and a road game each at the Toronto Maple Leafs and the Montreal Canadiens. After the season, the Bruins returned to the uniforms that they previously wore.

In a December 1, 2024, game against the Montreal Canadiens, the Bruins wore a commemorative uniform to honor the 100th anniversary of the franchise's first-ever game. The design featured the modernized version of the 1949–1995 "spoked B" logo worn during the centennial 2023–24 season but in the current yellow gold shade, and an inverted color version of the centennial "walking bear" patch along the right chest. The uniform was heavily based on the 1981–1995 uniforms, albeit with black tips on the gold socks. The collar featured the score of the team's first-ever game against the Montreal Maroons.

In June 2025, the team announced a logo change to take effect with the 2025–26 season – the centennial "Spoked B" logo as the team's primary logo, with the black "B" version applied to the white uniform and the gold "B" version applied to the black uniform. The new uniforms were heavily inspired by the 1977–1995 uniforms, and featured an updated "walking bear" patch on the left shoulder. This bear patch featured the team name on the black uniform, and the city name on the white uniform.

For the Bruins' appearance at the 2026 NHL Stadium Series, they wore bright gold uniforms with enlarged black lettering, using a variation of the "walking bear" logo as the crest. The left shoulder patch contained the black "B" logo with bear claw scratches, and said scratches were also applied on the black pants.

During the 2026–27 season, the Bruins unveiled a "Hometown Remix" uniform inspired by Boston's collegiate hockey tradition. The predominantly brown uniform featured the "BRUINS" wordmark and numbers on the chest in gold with brown and white accents, a "B" collegiate-style shoulder patch, and gold and white sleeve stripes.

=== Training facilities ===
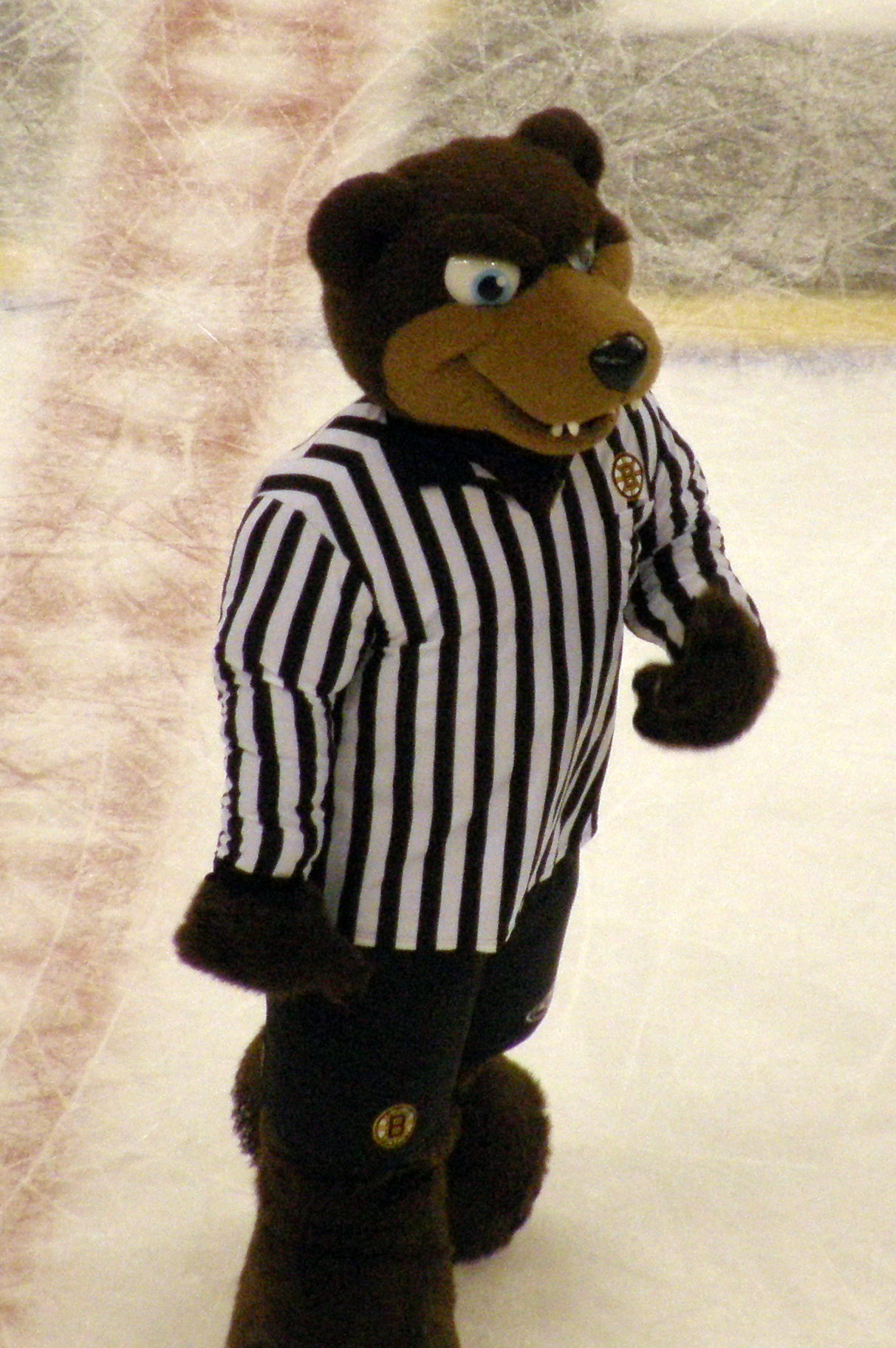
Blades the Bruin serves as the official mascot for the Boston Bruins.

The Bruins had trained at Ristuccia Ice Arena in Wilmington, Massachusetts from 1986 until 2016. They moved in September 2016 to Warrior Ice Arena in the Brighton neighborhood of Boston, where they are currently training.

=== Bruins' mascots ===
Blades the Bruin is an anthropomorphic bear who serves as the Bruins' team mascot.

=== Team songs ===
When Boston television station WSBK-TV began broadcasting Bruins games in 1967, The Ventures' instrumental rock version of the Nutcracker's overture, known as "Nutty", was selected as the opening piece of music for Bruins telecasts.

On ice, "Paree", a 1920s hit tune written by Leo Robin and Jose Padilla, has been played as an organ instrumental for decades, typically as the players entered the arena just before the start of each period and, for many years, after each Bruins' goal. It was introduced by John Kiley, the organist for the Bruins from the 1950s through the 1980s.

== Season-by-season record ==
This is a partial list of the last five seasons completed by the Bruins. For the full season-by-season history, see List of Boston Bruins seasons

Note: GP = Games played, W = Wins, L = Losses, T = Ties, OTL = Overtime losses, Pts = Points, GF = Goals for, GA = Goals against

Season	GP	W	L	OTL	Pts	GF	GA	Finish	Playoffs
2021–22	82	51	26	5	107	255	220	4th, Atlantic	Lost in first round, 3–4 (Hurricanes)
2022–23	82	65	12	5	135	305	177	1st, Atlantic	Lost in first round, 3–4 (Panthers)
2023–24	82	47	20	15	109	267	224	2nd, Atlantic	Lost in second round, 2–4 (Panthers)
2024–25	82	33	39	10	76	222	272	8th, Atlantic	Did not qualify
2025–26	82	45	27	10	100	272	250	4th, Atlantic	Lost in first round, 2–4 (Sabres)

== Players and personnel ==
=== Current roster ===
Updated October 7, 2026

No.	Nat	Player	Pos	S/G	Age	Acquired	Birthplace
45	(Canada)	Jonathan Aspirot	D	L	27	2025	Mascouche, Quebec
17	(United States)	Will Borgen	D	R	29	2026	Moorhead, Minnesota
59	(Canada)	Frederic Brunet	D	L	23	2022	Gatineau, Quebec
75	(United States)	Connor Clifton	D	R	31	2026	Long Branch, New Jersey
30	(Canada)	Michael DiPietro	G	L	27	2022	Windsor, Ontario
39	(Canada)	Morgan Geekie	RW	R	28	2023	Strathclair, Manitoba
44	(United States)	James Hagens	C	L	20	2025	Hauppauge, New York
84	(Canada)	Tanner Jeannot (A)	LW	L	29	2025	Oxbow, Saskatchewan
47	(United States)	Mark Kastelic	C	R	27	2024	Phoenix, Arizona
92	(Russia)	Marat Khusnutdinov	C	L	24	2025	Moscow, Russia
52	(United States)	Sean Kuraly	C	L	33	2025	Lewiston, New York
28	(Sweden)	Elias Lindholm	C	R	31	2024	Boden, Sweden
27	(Sweden)	Hampus Lindholm (A)	D	L	32	2022	Helsingborg, Sweden
6	(United States)	Mason Lohrei	D	L	25	2020	Baton Rouge, Louisiana
73	(United States)	Charlie McAvoy (A)	D	R	28	2016	Long Beach, New York
93	(Canada)	Fraser Minten	C	L	22	2025	Vancouver, British Columbia
11	(United States)	Casey Mittelstadt	C	L	27	2025	Eden Prairie, Minnesota
88	(Czech Republic)	David Pastrňák (C)	RW	R	30	2014	Havířov, Czech Republic
10	(Germany)	JJ Peterka	LW	L	24	2026	Munich, Germany
51	(Canada)	Matt Poitras	C	R	22	2022	Ajax, Ontario
1	(United States)	Jeremy Swayman	G	L	27	2017	Anchorage, Alaska
18	(Czech Republic)	Pavel Zacha	C	L	29	2022	Brno, Czech Republic
91	(Russia)	Nikita Zadorov	D	L	31	2024	Moscow, Russia

=== Team captains ===
- Sprague Cleghorn, 1925–1928
- Lionel Hitchman, 1928–1931
- George Owen, 1931–1932
- Dit Clapper, 1932–1933; 1939–1944
- Marty Barry, 1933–34
- Nels Stewart, 1934–35
- Eddie Shore, 1935–36
- Red Beattie, 1936–37
- Cooney Weiland, 1937–1939
- Bill Cowley, 1944–1945
- Jack Crawford, 1945–1946
- Bobby Bauer, 1946–1947
- Milt Schmidt, 1947–1954
- Ed Sandford, 1954–1955
- Fernie Flaman, 1955–1961
- Don McKenney, 1961–1963
- Leo Boivin, 1963–1966
- Johnny Bucyk, 1966–1967; 1973–1977
- Wayne Cashman, 1977–1983
- Terry O'Reilly, 1983–1985
- Ray Bourque and Rick Middleton, 1985–1988 (co-captains)
- Ray Bourque, 1988–2000
- Jason Allison, 2000–2001
- Joe Thornton, 2002–2005
- Zdeno Chára, 2006–2020
- Patrice Bergeron, 2021–2023
- Brad Marchand, 2023–2025
- David Pastrňák, 2026–present

There is evidence from contemporary newspaper accounts and photographs that Bruins manager Art Ross appointed captains on an annual basis in the 1930s and 1940s, and generally for a single season only. These include Marty Barry in 1933–34, Nels Stewart in 1934–35, Eddie Shore in 1935–36, Red Beattie in 1936–37, Bill Cowley in 1944–45 and Bobby Bauer in 1946–47. Having not acknowledged these captaincies for many years and declining comment on the issue, on September 20, 2023, the team confirmed these captaincies, stating there have been 27 (now 28) captains in franchise history.

=== Head coaches ===
On June 5, 2025, the Bruins announced the hiring of Marco Sturm as the 30th head coach in team history. Sturm played for the Bruins from 2005 to 2010, and became the first European head coach for the team.

=== General managers ===
Following the team's failure to make the 2015 playoffs, Peter Chiarelli was fired as general manager on April 15, 2015, with Don Sweeney hired as Chiarelli's replacement on May 20, 2015.

=== Presidents ===
- Charles F. Adams, November 1, 1924 – 1936
- Weston W. Adams, Sr., 1936–1951
- Walter A. Brown, 1951 – September 1964
- Weston W. Adams, Sr., September 1964 – March 30, 1969
- Weston W. Adams, Jr., March 31, 1969 – September 30, 1975
- Paul A. Mooney, October 1, 1975 – March 24, 1987
- William D. Hassett, Jr., March 24, 1987 – December 1, 1988
- Harry Sinden, December 1, 1988 – August 9, 2006
- Cam Neely, June 16, 2010 – present

=== Ownership ===
The team founder Charles Adams owned the team until 1936, at which point he transferred ownership to his son Weston Adams. Weston Adams remained majority owner until 1951, when the Boston Garden-Arena Corporation purchased controlling interest in the team. Under the Garden-Arena Corporation's management, Boston Celtics founder Walter A. Brown ran the team from 1951 until his death in 1964. After Brown's death, Weston Adams returned to the role of team president. In 1969, he was succeeded by his son, Weston Adams, Jr.

Former Bruins winger and current president Cam Neely, and owner Jeremy Jacobs.

On December 7, 1973, Storer Broadcasting, owner of WSBK-TV, and the Garden-Arena Corporation agreed to a merger which resulted in Storer acquiring a 100% interest in the Bruins. Adams remained as team president. In August 1975, Storer Broadcasting then sold the team to an ownership group headed by Jeremy Jacobs. Jacobs had to promise to keep Bobby Orr as a condition of the purchase. The Bruins and Orr reached a verbal agreement with Jacobs during the summer of 1975, including an agreement for Orr to take an 18.5% share of the Bruins after his retirement. However, Orr's agent, Alan Eagleson, rejected the deal.

Jacobs represents the club on the NHL's board of governors, and serves on its executive committee, and he has chaired the finance committee. At the NHL board of governors meeting in June 2007, Jacobs was elected chairman of the board, replacing the Calgary Flames' Harley Hotchkiss, who stepped down after 12 years in the position. Jacobs has frequently been listed by the Sports Business Journal as one of the most influential people in sports in its annual poll and by The Hockey News. His company, Delaware North, owns TD Garden.

After taking over as owner in 1975, the Bruins have been competitive (making the playoffs for 29 consecutive seasons from 1967–68 to 1995–96, 20 of which were with Jacobs as owner) but have won the Stanley Cup only once, in 2011 and only in his 36th year as owner. Under previous ownerships, the Bruins had won the Stanley Cup five times. Under Jacobs, the Bruins reached the Stanley Cup Final seven times (twice against the Bruins' rival Montreal Canadiens in 1977 and 1978, twice against the Edmonton Oilers in 1988 and 1990, finally winning in 2011 against the Vancouver Canucks, and losing in 2013 and 2019 to the Chicago Blackhawks and St. Louis Blues respectively). Jacobs' management of the team has previously earned him spots on ESPN.com's "Page 2" polls of "The Worst Owners in Sports", and number 7 on their 2005 "Greediest Owners in sports" list.

The current administrators in the Bruins front office are:

- Jeremy Jacobs – owner
- Charlie Jacobs – principal
- Don Sweeney – general manager
- Cam Neely – president
- Harry Sinden – senior advisor to the owner

=== First-round draft picks ===
- 1963: Orest Romashyna (3rd overall)
- 1964: Alex Campbell (2nd overall)
- 1965: Joe Bailey (4th overall)
- 1966: Barry Gibbs (1st overall)
- 1967: Meehan Bonnar (10th overall)
- 1968: Danny Schock (12th overall)
- 1969: Don Tannahill (3rd overall), Frank Spring (4th overall), Ivan Boldirev (11th overall)
- 1970: Reggie Leach (3rd overall), Rick MacLeish (4th overall), Ron Plumb (9th overall), Bob Stewart (13th overall)
- 1971: Ron Jones (6th overall), Terry O'Reilly (14th overall)
- 1972: Mike Bloom (16th overall)
- 1973: Andre Savard (6th overall)
- 1974: Don Larway (18th overall)
- 1975: Doug Halward (14th overall)
- 1976: Clayton Pachal (16th overall)
- 1977: Dwight Foster (16th overall)
- 1978: Al Secord (16th overall)
- 1979: Ray Bourque (8th overall), Brad McCrimmon (15th overall)
- 1980: Barry Pederson (18th overall)
- 1981: Normand Leveille (14th overall)
- 1982: Gord Kluzak (1st overall)
- 1983: Nevin Markwart (21st overall)
- 1984: Dave Pasin (19th overall)
- 1986: Craig Janney (13th overall)
- 1987: Glen Wesley (3rd overall), Stephane Quintal (14th overall)
- 1988: Robert Cimetta (18th overall)
- 1989: Shayne Stevenson (17th overall)
- 1990: Bryan Smolinski (21st overall)
- 1991: Glen Murray (18th overall)
- 1992: Dmitri Kvartalnov (16th overall)
- 1993: Kevyn Adams (25th overall)
- 1994: Evgeni Ryabchikov (21st overall)
- 1995: Kyle McLaren (9th overall), Sean Brown (21st overall)
- 1996: Johnathan Aitken (8th overall)
- 1997: Joe Thornton (1st overall), Sergei Samsonov (8th overall)
- 1999: Nick Boynton (21st overall)
- 2000: Lars Jonsson (7th overall), Martin Samuelsson (27th overall)
- 2001: Shaone Morrisonn (19th overall)
- 2002: Hannu Toivonen (29th overall)
- 2003: Mark Stuart (21st overall)
- 2005: Matt Lashoff (22nd overall)
- 2006: Phil Kessel (5th overall)
- 2007: Zach Hamill (8th overall)
- 2008: Joe Colborne (16th overall)
- 2009: Jordan Caron (25th overall)
- 2010: Tyler Seguin (2nd overall)
- 2011: Dougie Hamilton (9th overall)
- 2012: Malcolm Subban (24th overall)
- 2014: David Pastrňák (25th overall)
- 2015: Jakub Zbořil (13th overall), Jake DeBrusk (14th overall), Zachary Senyshyn (15th overall)
- 2016: Charlie McAvoy (14th overall), Trent Frederic (29th overall)
- 2017: Urho Vaakanainen (18th overall)
- 2019: John Beecher (30th overall)
- 2021: Fabian Lysell (21st overall)
- 2024: Dean Letourneau (25th overall)
- 2025: James Hagens (7th overall)

== Team and league honors ==
=== Retired numbers ===
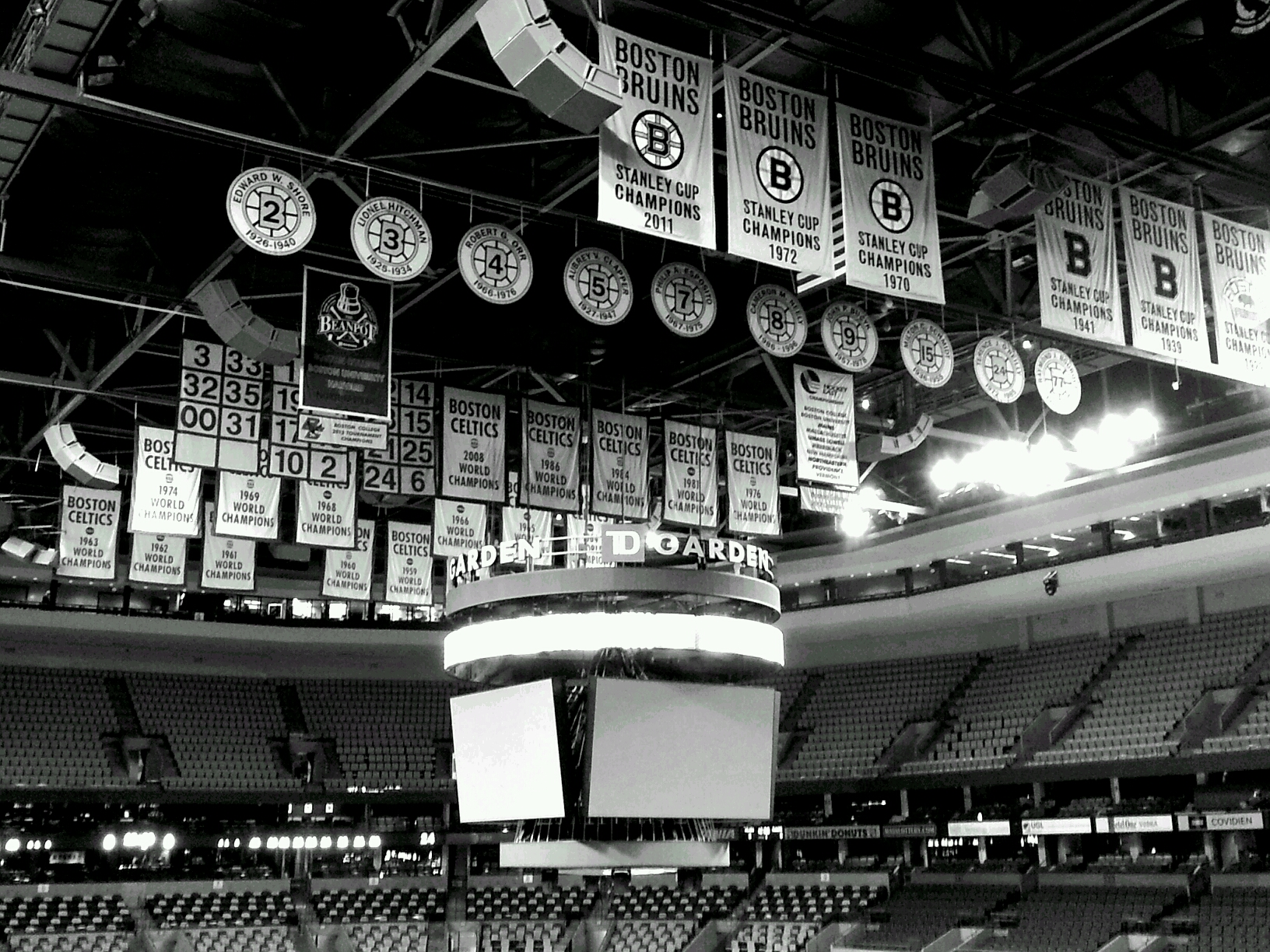
Banners of the Bruins' retired numbers hang at the Garden.

Boston Bruins retired numbers
No.	Player	Position	Career	No. retirement
2	Eddie Shore	D	1926–1940	January 1, 1947
3	Lionel Hitchman ^{1}	D	1925–1934	February 22, 1934
4	Bobby Orr	D	1966–1976	January 9, 1979
5	Aubrey "Dit" Clapper	RW, D	1927–1947	February 12, 1947
7	Phil Esposito	C	1967–1975	December 3, 1987
8	Cam Neely	RW	1986–1996	January 12, 2004
9	Johnny Bucyk	LW	1957–1978	March 13, 1980
15	Milt Schmidt	C	1936–1955	March 13, 1980
16	Rick Middleton	RW	1976–1988	November 29, 2018
22	Willie O'Ree	LW	1957–1958, 1960–1961	January 18, 2022
24	Terry O'Reilly	RW	1972–1985	October 24, 2002
33	Zdeno Chára	D	2006–2020	January 15, 2026
77	Ray Bourque	D	1979–2000	October 4, 2001

Additionally, Patrice Bergeron's no. 37 is scheduled to be retired by the Bruins on December 1, 2026.

Notes:

- ^{1} Hitchman was the first player to have his number retired by the Bruins, and the second in both the NHL, and in all of North American professional sports.
- The NHL retired Wayne Gretzky's number 99 for all of its member teams at the 2000 NHL All-Star Game.

=== Hall of Famers ===
The Boston Bruins acknowledge an affiliation with 58 inductees to the Hockey Hall of Fame: 54 former players and eight builders of the sport. The six individuals recognized as builders by the Hall of Fame includes former Bruins executives, general managers, head coaches, and owners. In addition to players and builders, two broadcasters for the Bruins were also awarded the Foster Hewitt Memorial Award from the Hockey Hall of Fame. In 1984, Fred Cusick, a play-by-play announcer, was awarded the Hall of Fame's inaugural Foster Hewitt Memorial Award. In 1987, Bob Wilson became the second Bruins' broadcaster to be awarded the Foster Hewitt Memorial Award.

==== Players ====
- Dave Andreychuk
- Marty Barry
- Bobby Bauer
- Patrice Bergeron
- Leo Boivin
- Ray Bourque
- Frank Brimsek
- Johnny Bucyk
- Billy Burch
- Zdeno Chára
- Gerry Cheevers
- Dit Clapper
- Sprague Cleghorn
- Paul Coffey
- Roy Conacher
- Bun Cook
- Bill Cowley
- Cy Denneny
- Woody Dumart
- Phil Esposito
- Fernie Flaman
- Frank Frederickson
- Jarome Iginla
- Busher Jackson
- Tom Johnson
- Duke Keats
- Guy Lapointe
- Brian Leetch
- Harry Lumley
- Mickey MacKay
- Sylvio Mantha
- Joe Mullen
- Cam Neely
- Adam Oates
- Harry Oliver
- Bobby Orr
- Bernie Parent
- Brad Park
- Jacques Plante
- Babe Pratt
- Bill Quackenbush
- Jean Ratelle
- Mark Recchi
- Art Ross (Note: Art Ross was the Bruins' first head coach and general manager. He was inducted in the players' category in 1945. Although Ross never played with the Bruins, and was not formally inducted in the builders category, the team continues to acknowledge an affiliation with the Hall of Famer.)
- Terry Sawchuk
- Milt Schmidt
- Eddie Shore
- Babe Siebert
- Hooley Smith
- Allan Stanley
- Nels Stewart
- Tiny Thompson
- Joe Thornton
- Rogie Vachon
- Cooney Weiland

==== Builders ====
- Charles Adams
- Weston Adams
- Walter A. Brown
- Pat Burns
- Jeremy Jacobs
- Willie O'Ree
- Harry Sinden

=== Franchise leaders ===
==== Scoring leaders ====
These are the top-ten regular season point-scorers in franchise history. Figures are updated after each completed NHL regular season.

- * – current Bruins player

Note: Pos = Position; GP = Games played; G = Goals; A = Assists; Pts = Points; P/G = Points per game

Points
Player	Pos	GP	G	A	Pts	P/G
Ray Bourque	D	1,518	395	1,111	1,506	.99
Johnny Bucyk	LW	1,436	545	794	1,339	.93
Patrice Bergeron	C	1,294	427	613	1,040	.80
Phil Esposito	C	625	459	553	1,012	1.62
Brad Marchand	LW	1,090	422	554	976	.90
David Pastrňák*	RW	833	420	513	933	1.12
Rick Middleton	RW	881	402	496	898	1.02
Bobby Orr	D	631	264	624	888	1.41
Wayne Cashman	LW	1,027	277	516	793	.77
David Krejčí	C	1,032	231	555	786	.76

Goals
Player	Pos	G
Johnny Bucyk	LW	545
Phil Esposito	C	459
Patrice Bergeron	C	427
Brad Marchand	LW	422
David Pastrňák*	RW	420
Rick Middleton	RW	402
Ray Bourque	D	395
Cam Neely	RW	344
Ken Hodge	RW	289
Wayne Cashman	LW	277

Assists
Player	Pos	A
Ray Bourque	D	1,111
Johnny Bucyk	LW	794
Bobby Orr	D	624
Patrice Bergeron	C	613
David Krejčí	C	555
Brad Marchand	LW	554
Phil Esposito	C	553
Wayne Cashman	LW	516
David Pastrňák*	RW	513
Rick Middleton	RW	496

==== Goaltending leaders ====
These goaltenders rank in the top ten in franchise history for wins. Figures are updated after each completed NHL season.

- * – current Bruins player

Note: GP = Games played; W = Wins; L = Losses; T/O = Ties/Overtime losses; GA = Goal against; GAA = Goals against average; SA = Shots against; SV% = Save percentage; SO = Shutouts

Goaltenders
Player	GP	W	L	T/O	GA	GAA	SA	SV%	SO
Tuukka Rask	564	308	165	66	1,230	2.28	15,575	.921	52
Tiny Thompson	468	252	153	63	959	1.99	—	—	74
Frank Brimsek	444	230	144	70	1,159	2.57	—	—	35
Gerry Cheevers	416	226	103	76	1,168	2.89	11,747	.901	26
Tim Thomas	378	196	121	45	899	2.48	11,432	.921	31
Eddie Johnston	444	182	192	54	1,381	3.22	13,756	.900	27
Gilles Gilbert	277	155	73	39	782	2.95	7,129	.890	16
Andy Moog	261	136	75	36	772	3.08	6,795	.886	13
Byron Dafoe	283	132	104	40	627	2.30	7,028	.911	25
Jeremy Swayman*	245	132	80	26	617	2.61	6,825	.910	18

=== Team awards ===
The Bruins have several team awards that are traditionally awarded at the last home game of the regular season.

- Elizabeth C. Dufresne Trophy
  Best player in home games
- Seventh Player Award
  Player performing most beyond expectations
- Eddie Shore Award
  Player with most hustle and determination
- John P. Bucyk Award
  Community service
- Bruins Radio Network Three-Star Awards
  Most three-star selections

=== Franchise individual records ===
- Most goals in a season: Phil Esposito, 76 (1970–71)
- Most assists in a season: Bobby Orr, 102 (1970–71)
- Most points in a season: Phil Esposito, 152 (1970–71)
- Most penalty minutes in a season: Jay Miller, 304 (1987–88)
- Lowest goals against average in a season: Frank Brimsek, 1.56 (1938–39)
- Most points per game in a season: Bill Cowley, 1.97 (1943–44)
- Most points in a season, defenseman: Bobby Orr, 139 (1970–71)
- Most points in a season, rookie: Joe Juneau, 102 (1992–93)
- Most wins in a season: Pete Peeters, 40 (1982–83); Linus Ullmark, 40 (2022–23)
- Most shutouts in a season: Hal Winkler, 15 (1927–28)
- Consecutive games streak: John Bucyk, 418 (January 23, 1969 – March 2, 1975)
- Longest point scoring streak: Bronco Horvath, 22 games, (1959–60)
- Highest save percentage in a season: Tim Thomas, .938 (2010–11)
- Longest winning streak by a goaltender, one season: Gilles Gilbert, 17 (1975–76)

== Media and broadcasters ==
NESN (New England Sports Network)

- Judd Sirott: TV play-by-play
- Andy Brickley: TV color analyst
- Andrew Raycroft: Rinkside reporter
- Adam Pellerin: Rinkside reporter

98.5 The Sports Hub

- Ryan Johnston: Radio play-by-play
- Bob Beers: Radio color analyst

== See also ==
- Bruins–Canadiens rivalry
- List of Boston Bruins award winners
- List of Boston Bruins records
- Sports in Massachusetts
- Sports in Boston

== Notes ==
Preceded by New York Rangers	Stanley Cup champions 1928–29	Succeeded by Montreal Canadiens
Preceded by Chicago Black Hawks	Stanley Cup champions 1938–39	Succeeded by New York Rangers
Preceded by New York Rangers	Stanley Cup champions 1940–41	Succeeded by Toronto Maple Leafs
Preceded by Montreal Canadiens	Stanley Cup champions 1969–70	Succeeded by Montreal Canadiens
Preceded by Montreal Canadiens	Stanley Cup champions 1971–72	Succeeded by Montreal Canadiens
Preceded by Chicago Blackhawks	Stanley Cup champions 2010–11	Succeeded by Los Angeles Kings
