= Charlie McAvoy =

American ice hockey player (born 1997)

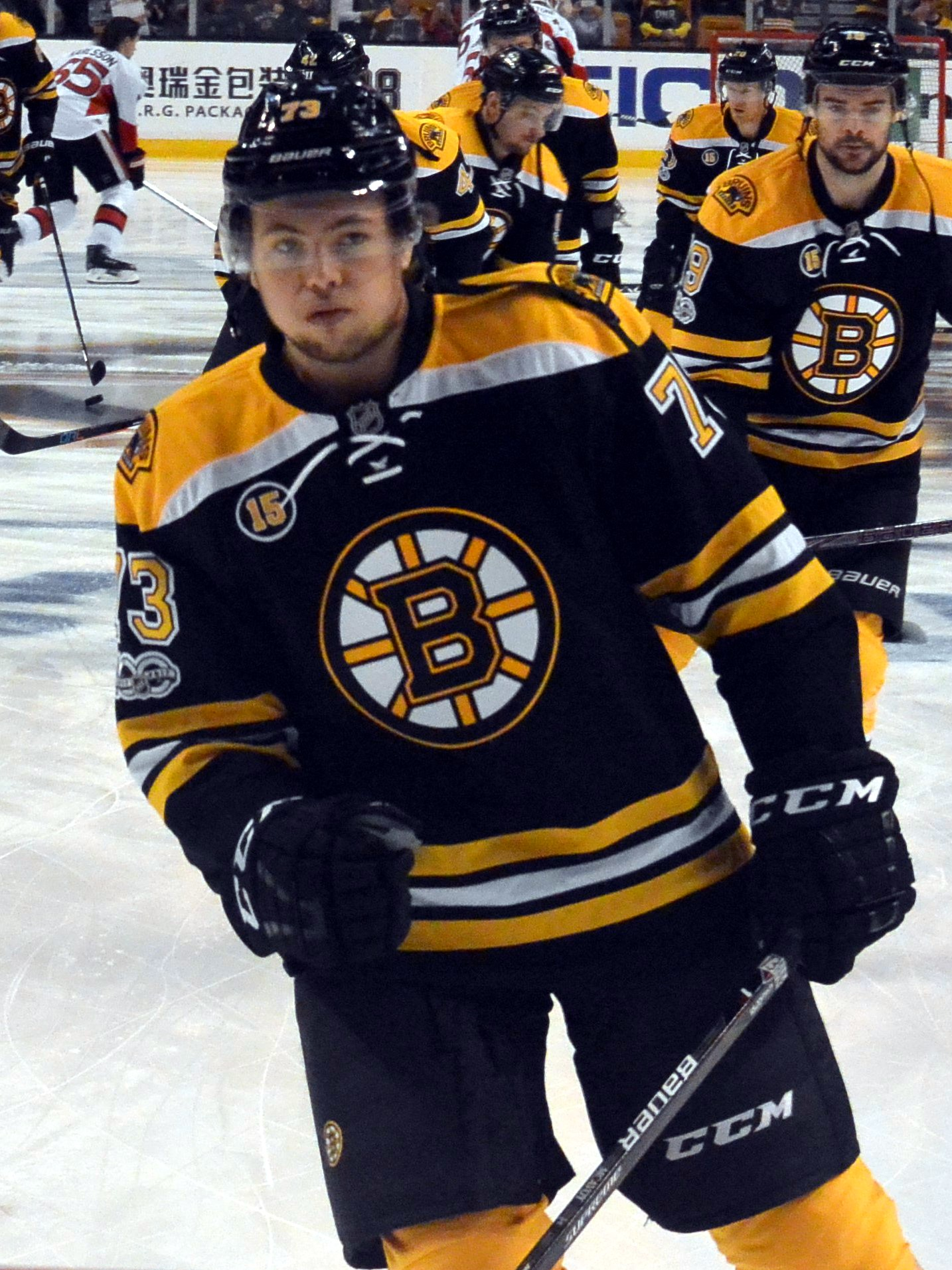
- McAvoy with the Boston Bruins in April 2017
- Born: December 21, 1997 (age 28) Long Beach, New York, U.S.
- Height: 6 ft 1 in (185 cm)
- Weight: 211 lb (96 kg; 15 st 1 lb)
- Position: Defense
- Shoots: Right
- NHL team: Boston Bruins
- National team: United States
- NHL draft: 14th overall, 2016; Boston Bruins
- Playing career: 2017–present

Charles Patrick McAvoy Jr. (born December 21, 1997) is an American professional ice hockey player who is a defenseman and alternate captain for the Boston Bruins of the National Hockey League (NHL). He was selected 14th overall in the 2016 NHL entry draft.

== Early life ==
McAvoy was born on December 21, 1997, in Long Beach, New York. His father, Charles McAvoy Sr., was the fourth-generation owner of Charles A. McAvoy Plumbing & Heating in Long Beach, while his mother Jennifer worked as an elementary school teacher in Bethpage, New York.

Although he grew up surrounded by New York Islanders fans, McAvoy and his family were supporters of the New York Rangers of the National Hockey League (NHL), as several members of the Rangers were customers at the family plumbing company. McAvoy grew up a big fan of defenseman Brian Leetch. He has also named former Rangers defenseman Ryan McDonagh as a favorite.

McAvoy grew up in Long Beach, New York, with three sisters. He attended Long Beach High School for one year before moving to Pioneer High School in Ann Arbor, Michigan, when he joined the USA Hockey developmental team.

== Playing career ==
=== Junior and collegiate career ===
McAvoy played in the 2010 Quebec International Pee-Wee Hockey Tournament with the New York Rangers minor ice hockey team. In August 2013, McAvoy committed to play college hockey at Boston University.

McAvoy played for the USA Hockey National Team Development Program in the United States Hockey League for two seasons. During the 2015–16 NCAA men's ice hockey season, BU coach David Quinn paired McAvoy with star BU defenseman and future fellow NHL player Matt Grzelcyk, already selected as a third round 2012 NHL entry draft pick by the Boston Bruins. McAvoy was part of the gold medal-winning team at the 2015 IIHF World U18 Championships. He was also a member of the bronze medal-winning U-20 team at the 2016 World Junior Ice Hockey Championships.

Leading up to the 2016 NHL entry draft, McAvoy was highly regarded by scouts and was considered one of the top four defensemen available.

=== Boston Bruins ===
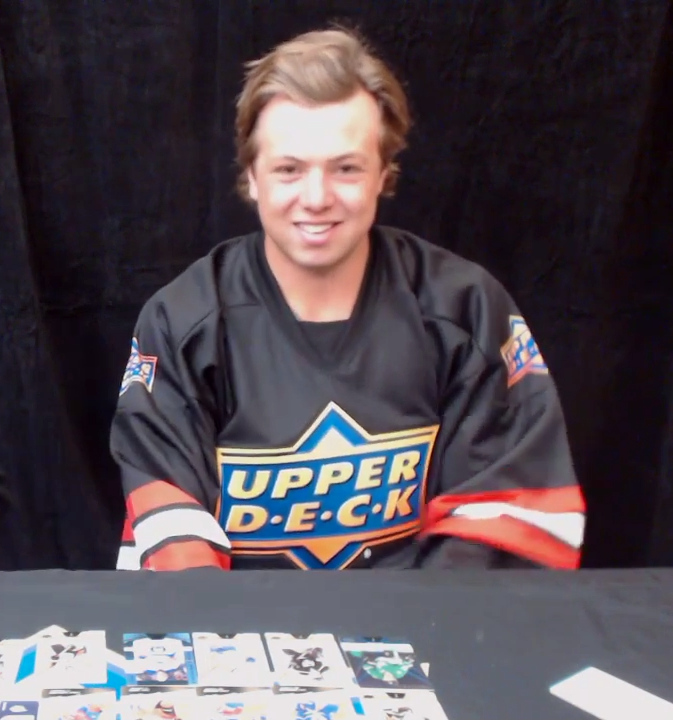
McAvoy signing autographs at a fan convention in 2017

==== 2017–18 season ====
On March 29, 2017, McAvoy ended his college hockey career by signing for an amateur try-out with the Providence Bruins, the Bruins' AHL affiliate. On April 10, McAvoy signed an entry-level NHL contract.

McAvoy's first game was on April 12, 2017, a 2–1 playoff victory over the Ottawa Senators. Despite having no prior NHL experience, he logged the second most ice time on the team. At a time when four of their top six defenders were injured, McAvoy notched three assists in six games. Following the Bruins' loss to the Ottawa Senators in the first round of the playoffs, by mid-June 2017 Bruins legend and Hall of Fame defenseman Bobby Orr spoke highly of McAvoy's level of talent and work ethic towards succeeding in NHL-level play.

McAvoy made his NHL regular season debut on October 5, 2017, the Bruins season opener against the Nashville Predators. McAvoy got his first regular season points in the game, a goal and an assist in a 4–3 win.

On December 18, 2017, McAvoy scored a Gordie Howe hat trick, which is an unofficial stat where a player gets a goal, an assist, and a fight in one game, against the Columbus Blue Jackets. The Bruins went on to win the game, 7–2.

Shortly after New Years' 2018, McAvoy was operated on for symptoms of what was diagnosed as supraventricular tachycardia, evidenced by an episode of heart arrhythmia following the Bruins' November 26, 2017 home game against the Edmonton Oilers. He was expected to take two weeks to fully recover from the ablative procedure used to treat the condition. By January 29, McAvoy had resumed practicing at the Warrior Ice Arena, only one week (January 22) after completing the atrial ablation procedure. By February 1, McAvoy had resumed full participation with his teammates in Bruins team practice sessions at the Warrior facility. McAvoy returned to NHL play on February 3, 2018, skating some 18:51 of ice time during a 4-1 Bruins home ice win against the Toronto Maple Leafs.

During the first game of a six-game homestand at the TD Garden, on February 27, 2018 McAvoy scored the winning overtime goal against the Carolina Hurricanes in a 4–3 home ice win, as the youngest Bruins defenseman to ever achieve the feat. On March 31, 2018, prior to a game against the Florida Panthers, McAvoy was the recipient of the 2017/18 NESN 7th Player Award. Following the Bruins defeat in the second round of the 2018 Stanley Cup playoffs, McAvoy was named to the senior United States roster to compete at the 2018 IIHF World Championship. At the conclusion of the 2017–18 NHL season McAvoy made the NHL All-Rookie team while finishing 5th overall in voting for the Calder Memorial Trophy for rookie of the year.

==== 2018–19 season ====
The following season, after playing in seven games, McAvoy was taken out of the Bruins lineup due to suffering a concussion on October 18 in a game against the Edmonton Oilers. He was officially placed on the Bruins injured reserve on October 30, and was activated off injured reserve on December 6, after missing 20 games. In his second game back, McAvoy left a game between the Bruins and Toronto Maple Leafs early after a late hit from Leafs forward Zach Hyman, but did not suffer any apparent injury. Hyman later received a two-game suspension for the hit. On May 7, 2019, McAvoy was suspended one playoff game for an illegal check to the head of Columbus Blue Jackets right winger Josh Anderson during game 6 of the second round. As a result of the suspension, he missed game 1 of the Eastern Conference final against the Carolina Hurricanes. McAvoy's sophomore season ended in heartbreak as the Bruins fell to the St. Louis Blues in Game 7 of the 2019 Stanley Cup Finals. McAvoy recorded eight points in the playoff run.

==== 2019–20 season ====
On September 15, 2019, as a restricted free agent, McAvoy signed a three-year, $14.7 million contract with the Bruins.

McAvoy did not take a big step forward in his production in the 2019–20 season, playing alongside NHL legend and Bruins captain Zdeno Chára. He had only 13 assists by the end of the calendar year, and didn't score his first goal of the season until February 5, 2020, an overtime winner against the Chicago Blackhawks. The NHL suspended the season in early March due to the COVID-19 pandemic, and later announced that the season was cancelled altogether, finishing McAvoy's season with five goals and 27 assists. In the 2020 Stanley Cup playoffs, playing in a bubble due to the pandemic, McAvoy recorded one goal and three assists, as the Bruins fell in five games in the second round to the Lightning. He finished 10th in Norris Trophy voting, awarded to the league's best defensemen.

==== 2020–21 season ====
In the 2020 offseason, both Chara and Torey Krug, important parts of the Bruins defense corps, left in the free agency. As a result, McAvoy was seen as a top defenseman on the Bruins roster. He finished fifth in Norris Trophy voting. Offensively, he posted similar totals, with five goals and 25 assists, playing 16 fewer games as the pandemic shortened season started in mid-January rather than late-October. In the playoffs, McAvoy scored an assist per game, with 11 assists in 11 games, adding a goal, which included a three-assist performance in Game 5 of the second round against the New York Islanders. McAvoy was also the Bruins leader in time-on-ice during their playoff run, which ended in the second round to the Islanders.

==== 2021–22 season ====
Once again set to be a restricted free agent, on October 15, 2021, McAvoy signed an eight-year, $76 million contract extension with the Bruins. At the time, it was the biggest contract in Bruins history.

In 2021–22, McAvoy finally took the step forward on offense that the Bruins and their fans were hoping he would. McAvoy scored career highs in both goals and assists, with 10 and 46, respectively. In addition to his offensive numbers, McAvoy continued to be a steady presence on the Bruins blue line, finishing top-5 in Norris voting for the second straight year, and top-10 for the third straight year. It was his best showing, finishing fourth in voting. In seven playoff games, McAvoy kept up his offensive stats with five assists, but the Bruins fell in seven games to the Hurricanes.

==== 2022–23 season ====
On June 3, 2022, the Bruins announced that McAvoy underwent shoulder surgery and would miss six months, sidelining him for the beginning of the 2022–23 season. McAvoy made his season debut on November 10, 2022, and scored a goal in the game. McAvoy and the Bruins set the NHL single-season records with 65 wins and 135 points. The Florida Panthers upset the Bruins in seven games in the opening round of the 2023 Stanley Cup playoffs. McAvoy had five assists in the series after posting seven goals and 45 assists in the regular season.

==== 2023–24 season ====
On October 30, 2023, McAvoy delivered an illegal check to the head on Florida Panthers defenseman Oliver Ekman-Larsson, who was injured on the play. McAvoy received a match penalty, and was suspended for four games.

==== 2024–25 season ====
McAvoy once again entered the season as the Bruins' number one defenseman. Although the Bruins struggled throughout the season, McAvoy remained an anchor on the blue line, and was solid offensively as well. In the Bruins Centennial Game on December 1, 2024, McAvoy scored two goals to help the Bruins beat the Montreal Canadiens 6-3. From December 14 to December 23, McAvoy had an assist in five straight games. On January 30, 2025, it was announced McAvoy would serve as an alternate captain for Team USA at the upcoming 4 Nations Face-Off. It would be the first time that McAvoy had represented the United States in an international hockey competition since the 2018 World Championships. McAvoy entered the tournament with high hopes, but on February 15, 2025, in a round-robin game against Team Canada, McAvoy suffered an upper-body injury, and was ruled out of the next game against Sweden.

On February 18, the Bruins announced in a statement that McAvoy had been admitted to Massachusetts General Hospital to "undergo testing related to an upper-body injury." It was revealed that McAvoy had suffered an infection from the injury, and was week-to-week and subsequently ruled out of the 4 Nations Championship game against Canada. On April 11, 2025, Bruins interim head coach Joe Sacco confirmed that McAvoy would not return for the season. After the season, it was revealed that McAvoy had suffered a Grade 5 AC joint separation in his shoulder, and was given a pain-killing injection, leading to the infection.

==== 2025–26 season ====
In August 2025 while attending the Team USA Orientation Camp for the 2026 Olympics, McAvoy spoke about his shoulder injury and indicated that while he had gotten pretty healthy near the end of the 2024-2025 season and he would have played if they made the playoffs, it was for the best to allow his shoulder to heal for longer. McAvoy had a number of face and mouth related injuries during the 2025-2026 season. In mid-November 2025, he broke his jaw and lost four teeth after being hit in the left side of his face by a slapshot from Canadiens player Noah Dobson, then on February 4, 2026 McAvoy was elbowed in the face by Panthers player Sandis Vilmanis while wearing a full face shield. On March 5, a puck hit McAvoy on the right side of his mouth chipping a tooth during a game against the Nashville Predators and on March 10, was hit into the glass by Kings player Samuel Helenius with the left side of his mouth taking the brunt of the hit.

By the February 2026 Olympic winter break, McAvoy had played in 45 Bruins games, with four goals and 35 assists, and a career high of 2.15 points per 60 minutes. He finished with a career-high 61 points by the season's end through 69 games played, as the Bruins qualified for the 2026 Stanley Cup playoffs and matched against the Buffalo Sabres in the first round.

During the last minutes of Game 6 of the 2026 playoffs, McAvoy was tripped by Sabres player Zach Benson while skating back for an icing call. Once he got up, McAvoy skated directly over to Benson and delivered a two-handed slash. McAvoy was assessed a five-minute major penalty and an automatic game misconduct, while Benson was given a two-minute minor for the infraction. McAvoy was offered an in-person hearing with the NHL Department of Player Safety over his conduct. On May 12, McAvoy was suspended for the first 6 games of the 2026–27 season.

== International play ==
Medal record

Men's ice hockey

Representing the United States

Olympic Games
Gold medal – first place	2026 Milano Cortina	

World Championships
Bronze medal – third place	2018 Denmark	

4 Nations Face-Off
Runner-up	2025 Canada/United States	

World Junior Championships
Gold medal – first place	2017 Canada	
Bronze medal – third place	2016 Finland	

World U18 Championships
Gold medal – first place	2015 Switzerland	

World U-17 Hockey Challenge
Gold medal – first place	2014 Nova Scotia	

McAvoy has won a gold medal at every junior level. He won at the 2014 World U-17 Hockey Challenge (January tournament), 2015 IIHF World U18 Championship and 2017 World Junior Championship. At the 2017 event, he was named player of the game in the gold-medal match.

McAvoy led all defenseman in scoring at the 2018 IIHF World Championship with nine points, despite only playing in six games due to the Bruins playing in the second round of the Stanley Cup playoffs. He won the bronze medal at the tournament.

On June 16, 2025, he was one of six players named to Team USA's preliminary roster for the 2026 Winter Olympics. McAvoy was named as one of the alternate captains for the team alongside Matthew Tkachuk with Auston Matthews named as captain. While McAvoy didn't score a point during the Olympics he was normally paired with Quinn Hughes and was credited with keeping the puck out of the US goal during the final US vs Canada game.

== Personal life ==
McAvoy says he tries to emulate Los Angeles Kings defenseman Drew Doughty and Nashville Predators defenseman Tyson Barrie.

McAvoy married his longtime girlfriend, Kiley, in August 2023, who is the daughter of the New York Rangers' head coach Mike Sullivan. The two met at Boston University, and got engaged in July 2022 in Italy. They welcomed their first child Rhys on January 26, 2025. In May 2026, the McAvoys shared through Kiley's Instagram account that Rhys had been diagnosed with Williams Syndrome, a rare genetic condition that affects development and multiple organ systems.

Prior to the 2026 Winter Olympics, McAvoy was questioned on LGBT players and fans, alongside the popular queer hockey romance show Heated Rivalry. McAvoy expressed his support stating that as a team the Bruins had tried to make their space allow everyone to feel safe and comfortable, and that showing support was the least they can do.

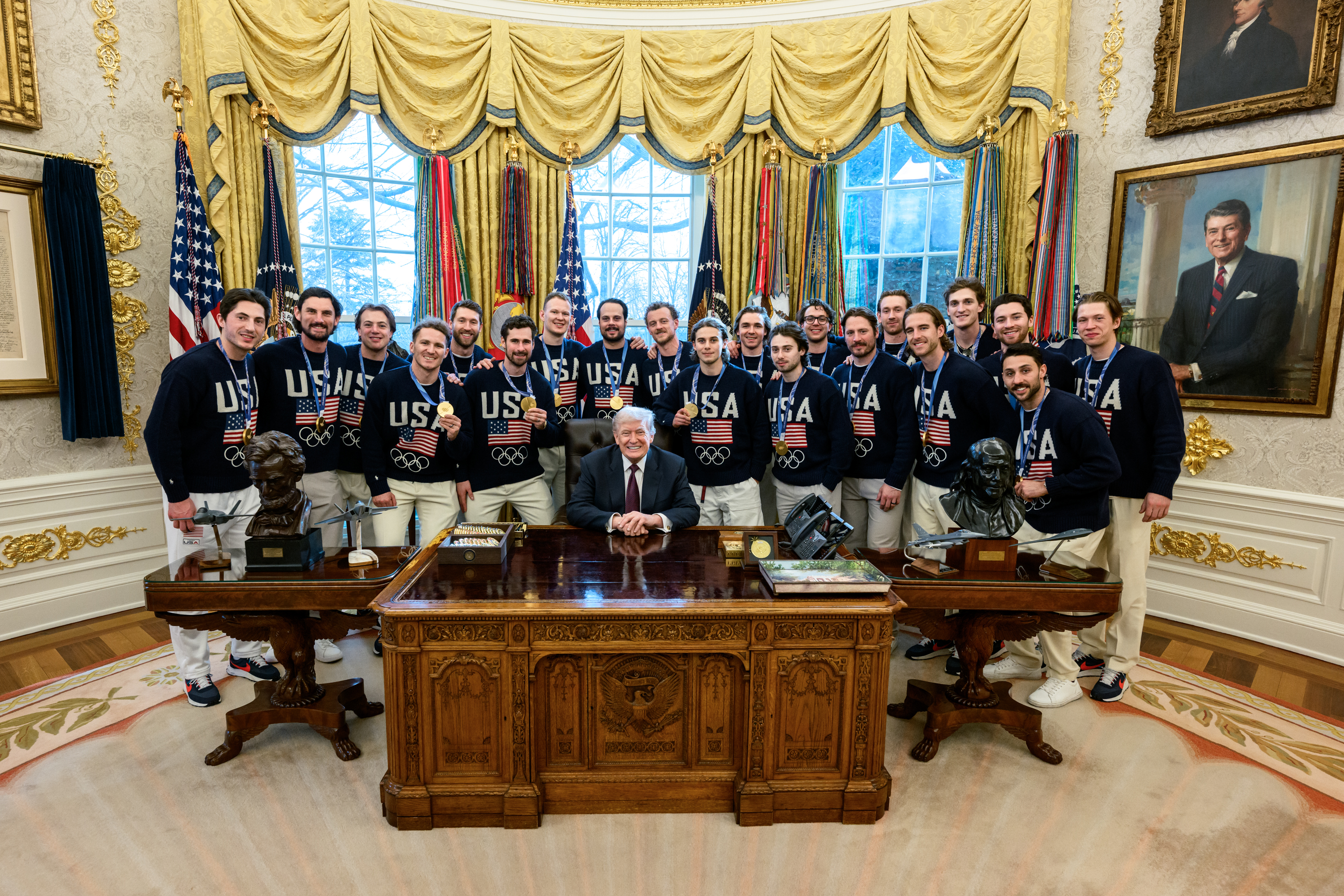
McAvoy and teammates posing with President Trump during White House visit in February 2026

Amid online backlash faced by the men's Olympic hockey team regarding the inclusion of FBI director Kash Patel during their gold medal celebrations and members of the team laughing at President Trump's comments of being impeached if he did not invite the women's team to the White House, the team was invited to meet with the president and attend the State of the Union. McAvoy was among the majority who visited with the president and attended the State of the Union. He later told reporters that he was sorry for how the team responded to the comments and continued by praising the women's team calling the win "unbelievable" and that the men's team supported the women's.

== Career statistics ==
=== Regular season and playoffs ===
			Regular season					Playoffs
Season	Team	League	GP	G	A	Pts	PIM	GP	G	A	Pts	PIM
2013–14	US NTDP Juniors	USHL	34	4	6	10	56	—	—	—	—	—
2013–14	US NTDP U17	USDP	54	7	12	19	58	—	—	—	—	—
2014–15	US NTDP Juniors	USHL	23	3	16	19	33	—	—	—	—	—
2014–15	US NTDP U18	USDP	63	7	33	40	51	—	—	—	—	—
2015–16	Boston University	HE	37	3	22	25	56	—	—	—	—	—
2016–17	Boston University	HE	38	5	21	26	51	—	—	—	—	—
2016–17	Providence Bruins	AHL	4	0	2	2	4	—	—	—	—	—
2016–17	Boston Bruins	NHL	—	—	—	—	—	6	0	3	3	2
2017–18	Boston Bruins	NHL	63	7	25	32	53	12	1	4	5	6
2018–19	Boston Bruins	NHL	54	7	21	28	45	23	2	6	8	16
2019–20	Boston Bruins	NHL	67	5	27	32	41	13	1	3	4	24
2020–21	Boston Bruins	NHL	51	5	25	30	38	11	1	11	12	4
2021–22	Boston Bruins	NHL	78	10	46	56	66	6	0	5	5	4
2022–23	Boston Bruins	NHL	67	7	45	52	54	7	0	5	5	8
2023–24	Boston Bruins	NHL	74	12	35	47	86	13	1	5	6	20
2024–25	Boston Bruins	NHL	50	7	16	23	46	—	—	—	—	—
2025–26	Boston Bruins	NHL	69	11	50	61	62	6	0	2	2	19
NHL totals			573	71	290	361	491	97	6	44	50	103

=== International ===
Year	Team	Event	Result	GP	G	A	Pts	PIM
2014	United States	U17	1st place, gold medalist(s)	6	1	2	3	0
2015	United States	WJC18	1st place, gold medalist(s)	7	0	4	4	2
2016	United States	WJC	3rd place, bronze medalist(s)	7	0	0	0	0
2017	United States	WJC	1st place, gold medalist(s)	7	2	4	6	14
2017	United States	WC	5th	8	0	1	1	6
2018	United States	WC	3rd place, bronze medalist(s)	6	3	6	9	4
2025	United States	4NF	2nd	2	0	0	0	0
2026	United States	OG	1st place, gold medalist(s)	6	0	0	0	6
Junior totals				27	3	10	13	16
Senior totals				22	3	7	10	16

== Awards and honors ==
Award	Year
College
Hockey East All-Rookie Team	2016
Hockey East First All-Star Team	2017
AHCA East First-Team All-American	2017
NHL
NHL All-Rookie Team	2018
NHL Second All-Star Team	2022
International
IIHF World Junior Championship All-Star Team	2017
Boston Bruins
Seventh Player Award	2018
Eddie Shore Award	2022, 2026
Named One of Top 100 Best Bruins Players of all Time	2024

Awards and achievements
Preceded by Zachary Senyshyn	Boston Bruins first-round draft pick 2016	Succeeded by Trent Frederic
