= Rusty Crawford =

Canadian ice hockey player (1885–1971)

- Hockey Hall of Fame, 1962
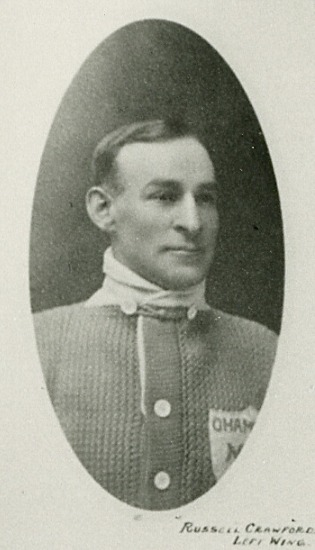
- Crawford with the Toronto Arenas
- Born: November 7, 1885 Cardinal, Ontario, Canada
- Died: December 19, 1971 (aged 86) Prince Albert, Saskatchewan, Canada
- Height: 5 ft 11 in (180 cm)
- Weight: 165 lb (75 kg; 11 st 11 lb)
- Position: Left wing
- Shot: Left
- Played for: Quebec Bulldogs; Ottawa Senators; Toronto Arenas; Saskatoon Crescents; Calgary Tigers; Vancouver Maroons
- Playing career: 1909–1930

Samuel Russell Crawford (November 7, 1885 – December 19, 1971) was a Canadian professional ice hockey forward who played for the Quebec Bulldogs of the National Hockey Association (NHA), Ottawa Senators and Toronto Arenas of the National Hockey League (NHL) and Saskatoon Crescents, Calgary Tigers and Vancouver Maroons of the Western Canada Hockey League (WCHL). He was a two-time Stanley Cup champion, winning the trophy with the Bulldogs in 1913 and the Arenas in 1918. Crawford was one of the sport's early stars and appeared in 258 games in the three major leagues, scoring 110 goals. He was inducted into the Hockey Hall of Fame in 1963.

== Playing career ==
Crawford was born in Cardinal, Ontario, and played junior hockey in Vernon, near Ottawa, winning the Shaver Cup with the team in 1910. Following a stint playing amateur hockey in Verdun, Quebec, Crawford moved to Saskatchewan, settling in Prince Albert. He played with the Prince Albert Mintos of the Saskatchewan Professional Hockey League in 1910–11 where he scored 26 goals in 7 games. He joined the Saskatoon Hoo-Hoos from 1911–12. Both the Mintos and Hoo-Hoos issued challenges for the Stanley Cup in the year Crawford played with them, but his teams were eliminated from the competition by other teams before facing the holders of the trophy.

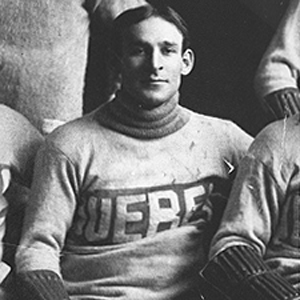
Rusty Crawford with the Quebec Bulldogs

Returning east, Crawford joined the defending Stanley Cup champion Quebec Bulldogs of the National Hockey Association (NHA) in 1912 and became a top scorer in the NHA during his time there. He won his first Stanley Cup in his first season, helping the Bulldogs defend their title against challenger from Sydney, Nova Scotia. Following the collapse of the NHA in 1917, the Bulldogs joined the newly formed National Hockey League, but chose not to operate in its first seasons. Crawford was claimed by the Ottawa Senators in a dispersal draft. He began the 1917–18 NHL season with Ottawa but was loaned to the Toronto Arenas late in the season as the Senators were required to keep their roster within required limits after they signed Frank Nighbor to a contract. Completing the season in Toronto, Crawford and the Arenas won the Stanley Cup, defeating the Pacific Coast Hockey Association's Vancouver Millionaires in a five-game series. The Arenas signed Crawford to a new contract before the 1918–19 season, a deal that was protested by Ottawa who claimed that they retained his rights since he was only given to Toronto on loan. NHL president Frank Calder was required to arbitrate a resolution, and ordered the Toronto club to surrender one player of Ottawa's choice in exchange for Crawford. Following the season, Crawford returned to Saskatoon to play senior-amateur hockey with the Saskatoon Crescents.

He remained with Saskatoon while they turned into a professional team with the formation of the Western Canada Hockey League (WCHL) in 1921. He was traded to the Calgary Tigers in 1922 for cash. By the time he joined the Tigers, he was already considered one of the game's all-time great players, and was regarded as one of the fastest skaters in Western Canada. He won the WCHL championship in 1923–24, scoring one of Calgary's goals in a 2–0 victory over the Regina Capitals to clinch the title. He appeared in the 1924 Stanley Cup Final, where Calgary lost to the Montreal Canadiens.

After one more year in Calgary, Crawford was traded to the Vancouver Maroons in exchange for Fern Headley. After one year in Vancouver, he moved onto the Minneapolis Millers of the American Hockey Association for four seasons and was a member of their 1927–28 championship team. Crawford announced his retirement in 1930 at the age of 45. He coached one season of senior hockey with Prince Albert of the Saskatchewan Senior Hockey League in 1930–31 before leaving the sport for good. Crawford was inducted into the Hockey Hall of Fame in 1963.

== Instances of rough play ==
Crawford was involved in several instances of rough play throughout his hockey career where he was reprimanded either by legal authorities or by league ruling. In 1910, while a member of Prince Albert Mintos, he assaulted Reginald Brehaut of the Saskatoon Strathconas in a game in Saskatoon on January 11. Crawford was later found guilty of assault on January 19 in a Saskatoon city police court and fined $5 and costs.

During the 1918–19 NHL season, in a game between the Ottawa Senators and the Toronto Arenas, Crawford, representing Toronto, assaulted Jack Darragh of the Ottawa club by striking him with his stick over the neck, and he was given a double major penalty (10 minutes) by referee Harvey Pulford. Previous to the attack on Darragh he had also slashed Frank Nighbor during the first period drawing a major penalty on the play. During the interval between the second and third period Sergeant Barlow of the Ottawa police department visited the Toronto dressing room and informed coach Dick Carroll of the Toronto Arenas that if he used Crawford in the upcoming period Crawford would be arrested for assaulting Darragh. Later on January 27 NHL president Frank Calder fined Crawford $25 for rough play based on referee Harvey Pulford's report.

During the 1923–24 WCHL season Crawford, playing for the Calgary Tigers, was suspended one game by the league for assaulting Gordon Keats of the Edmonton Eskimos.

== Off the ice ==
Crawford ran into legal trouble in Vancouver in 1926 when he pleaded guilty to the theft of $550 at a party. He admitted taking the money but intended to keep it only for safekeeping. He was given a suspended sentence.

Following his retirement, Crawford farmed in the Spruce Home, Saskatchewan area. He sold his farm in 1960 and moved to Prince Albert, where he remained until he died in 1971.

== Career statistics ==
=== Regular season and playoffs ===
			Regular season					Playoffs
Season	Team	League	GP	G	A	Pts	PIM	GP	G	A	Pts	PIM
1907–08	Montreal Montegnards	MCHL	—	—	—	—	—	—	—	—	—	—
1908–09	Newington Ontarios	OHA Sr	—	—	—	—	—	—	—	—	—	—
1909–10	Prince Albert Mintos	N-SSHL	3	4	0	4	—	—	—	—	—	—
1909–10	Prince Albert Mintos	Sask-Pro	—	—	—	—	—	4	1	0	1	14
1910–11	Prince Albert Mintos	Sask-Pro	7	26	0	26	—	4	4	0	4	26
1911–12	Saskatoon Hoo-Hoos	Sask-Pro	1	2	0	2	—	—	—	—	—	—
1911–12	Saskatoon Wholesalers	Sask-Pro	1	2	0	2	—	2	2	0	2	12
1912–13	Quebec Bulldogs	NHA	19	4	0	4	29	—	—	—	—	—
1912–13	Quebec Bulldogs	Stanley Cup	—	—	—	—	—	1	0	0	0	0
1913–14	Quebec Bulldogs	NHA	19	15	10	25	14	—	—	—	—	—
1914–15	Quebec Bulldogs	NHA	20	18	8	26	30	—	—	—	—	—
1915–16	Quebec Bulldogs	NHA	22	18	5	23	54	—	—	—	—	—
1916–17	Quebec Bulldogs	NHA	19	11	9	20	77	—	—	—	—	—
1917–18	Ottawa Senators	NHL	11	1	0	1	9	—	—	—	—	—
1917–18	Toronto Arenas	NHL	9	2	0	2	51	2	2	1	3	9
1918–19	Toronto Arenas	NHL	18	7	3	10	51	—	—	—	—	—
1919–20	Saskatoon Crescents	SSHL	12	3	3	6	14	—	—	—	—	—
1920–21	Saskatoon Crescents	SSHL	14	11	7	18	12	4	2	2	4	4
1921–22	Saskatoon/Moose Jaw Crescents	WCHL	11	3	1	4	7	—	—	—	—	—
1922–23	Saskatoon Sheiks	WCHL	19	7	6	13	10	—	—	—	—	—
1922–23	Calgary Tigers	WCHL	11	3	1	4	7	—	—	—	—	—
1923–24	Calgary Tigers	WCHL	26	4	4	8	21	2	1	0	1	2
1923–24	Calgary Tigers	West-PO	—	—	—	—	—	3	0	1	1	4
1923–24	Calgary Tigers	St-Cup	—	—	—	—	—	2	0	0	0	0
1924–25	Calgary Tigers	WCHL	27	12	2	14	27	2	0	0	0	4
1925–26	Vancouver Maroons	WHL	14	0	0	0	8	—	—	—	—	—
1926–27	Minneapolis Millers	AHA	32	2	3	5	51	6	3	0	3	13
1927–28	Minneapolis Millers	AHA	34	4	2	6	27	8	3	0	3	10
1928–29	Minneapolis Millers	AHA	40	3	9	12	33	4	0	0	0	0
1929–30	Minneapolis Millers	AHA	43	3	4	7	32	—	—	—	—	—
1930–31	Prince Albert Mintos	N-SSHL	—	—	—	—	—	—	—	—	—	—
NHA totals			99	66	32	98	204	4	3	0	3	19
WCHL totals			121	34	21	55	102	9	1	1	2	10
NHL totals			38	10	3	13	117	2	2	1	3	9
