= Herb Gardiner =

Canadian ice hockey player (1891–1972)

- Hockey Hall of Fame, 1958
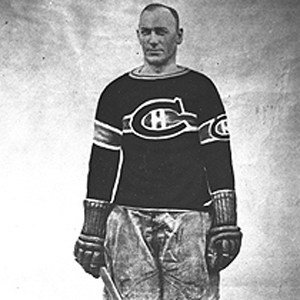
- Gardiner with the Montreal Canadiens
- Born: May 8, 1891 Winnipeg, Manitoba, Canada
- Died: January 11, 1972 (aged 80) Philadelphia, Pennsylvania, U.S.
- Height: 5 ft 10 in (178 cm)
- Weight: 190 lb (86 kg; 13 st 8 lb)
- Position: Defence
- Shot: Left
- Played for: Calgary Tigers; Montreal Canadiens; Chicago Black Hawks
- Playing career: 1921–1935

Herbert Martin Gardiner (May 8, 1891 – January 11, 1972) was a Canadian professional ice hockey defenceman who played for the Calgary Tigers of the Western Canada Hockey League (WCHL) and the Montreal Canadiens and Chicago Black Hawks of the National Hockey League (NHL) between 1920 and 1929. Additionally, he was the head coach of the Black Hawks for part of the 1928–29 season. Gardiner was a member of the WCHL champion Tigers in 1924 and in 1927 won the Hart Trophy as the NHL's most valuable player after playing every minute of every game for the Canadiens. He coached several minor professional teams in Philadelphia following his retirement as a player. Gardiner was inducted into the Hockey Hall of Fame in 1958.

== Early life ==
Born in Winnipeg, Manitoba in 1891, Gardiner first played senior hockey in that city in 1908 before moving on to other pursuits. He began a career as a banker in 1909, winning the Winnipeg Bank League's hockey title. At this point in time Gardiner played as a winger on the forward line. He stopped playing entirely for four years as he took on a job as a surveyor for the Canadian Pacific Railway. He joined the 2nd Battalion, Canadian Mounted Rifles of the Canadian Expeditionary Force in 1915. Gardiner faced several medical issues while serving: he was reported to have jaundice, pleurisy, and respiratory ailments in medical reports. He was also wounded in combat, shot in the nose in June 1916, possibly at the Battle of Mont Sorrel. Enlisting as a private, he rose to the rank of lieutenant by the time he was sent back to Canada and discharged in March 1918. Returning from the war, Gardiner resumed his surveyor's job and settled in Calgary, Alberta.

== Playing career ==
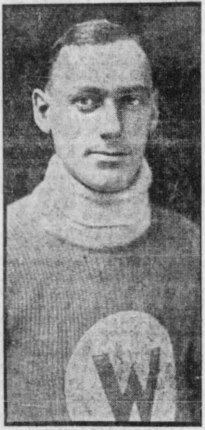
Gardiner in 1919–20 as a member of the Calgary Wanderers.

Returning to hockey, Gardiner joined the Calgary Wanderers of Alberta's Big-4 League in 1919 then shifted to the Calgary Tigers one season later. He turned professional at the age of 29 in 1921–22 when the Tigers joined the newly formed Western Canada Hockey League, and quickly established himself as one of the league's top defencemen. He was a key member of the Tigers' team that won the 1923–24 WCHL championship. Gardiner and the Tigers lost to the Montreal Canadiens in the Stanley Cup Final, but his performance impressed the Montreal organization. When the WCHL collapsed in 1926, the Canadiens purchased his rights and invited him to join their team.

Gardiner made his NHL debut in 1926 at the age of 35 and immediately showed himself to be one of the league's top defenders. Playing on a rebuilding Montreal team, he was said to have played every minute of every game for the Canadiens, a feat that earned him the nickname of "the ironman of hockey". He was named the winner of the Hart Trophy as the league's most valuable player, nine votes ahead of Bill Cook of the New York Rangers. As of 2022, Gardiner remains the second-oldest player to ever win the award after Eddie Shore, and along with Wayne Gretzky is one of only two players to be named most valuable in their first year in the league.

Gardiner again appeared in all 44 games the Canadiens played in 1927–28, but was loaned to the Chicago Black Hawks to start the 1928–29 season. Serving as a player-coach in Chicago, Gardiner appeared in 13 games as a player, but posted a dismal 5–23–4 record as coach. Montreal recalled him from Chicago in February 1929 and he finished his NHL career with the Canadiens. His rights were sold to the Boston Bruins following the season, before he was purchased by the Philadelphia Arrows of the Canadian–American Hockey League who named him as their head coach. Gardiner remained with the team, renamed the Philadelphia Ramblers in 1935-36, who subsequently joined the American Hockey League as an affiliate of the New York Rangers. He led the Ramblers to the Calder Cup finals in 1937 and 1939. Gardiner continued coaching until 1946. In 1947, efforts were made to relocate the suspended Montreal Maroons franchise to Philadelphia. The organization named Gardiner the general manager of the proposed Philadelphia Maroons but the team was never launched. He remained in Philadelphia following his retirement, living in the city until his death in 1972.

Gardiner was elected to the Hockey Hall of Fame in 1958. He is also in the Manitoba Hockey Hall of Fame.

== Career statistics ==
=== Regular season and playoffs ===
			Regular season					Playoffs
Season	Team	League	GP	G	A	Pts	PIM	GP	G	A	Pts	PIM
1909–10	Winnipeg Victorias	WSrHL	2	3	0	3	0	—	—	—	—	—
1914–15	Calgary Monarchs	AAHL	3	4	0	4	—	—	—	—	—	—
1918–19	Calgary Rotary Club	CSRHL	—	—	—	—	—	6	4	4	8	—
1919–20	Calgary Wanderers	Big-4	12	8	9	17	6	2	0	0	0	2
1920–21	Calgary Tigers	Big-4	13	3	7	10	6	—	—	—	—	—
1921–22	Calgary Tigers	WCHL	24	4	1	5	6	2	0	0	0	0
1922–23	Calgary Tigers	WCHL	29	9	3	12	9	—	—	—	—	—
1923–24	Calgary Tigers	WCHL	22	5	5	10	4	2	1	0	1	0
1923–24	Calgary Tigers	St-Cup	—	—	—	—	—	2	2	1	3	0
1924–25	Calgary Tigers	WCHL	28	12	8	20	18	2	0	0	0	0
1925–26	Calgary Tigers	WHL	27	3	1	4	10	—	—	—	—	—
1926–27	Montreal Canadiens	NHL	44	6	6	12	26	4	0	0	0	10
1927–28	Montreal Canadiens	NHL	44	4	3	7	26	2	0	1	1	4
1928–29	Chicago Black Hawks	NHL	13	0	0	0	0	—	—	—	—	—
1928–29	Montreal Canadiens	NHL	7	0	0	0	0	3	0	0	0	2
1929–30	Philadelphia Arrows	Can-Am	1	0	0	0	0	—	—	—	—	—
1931–32	Philadelphia Arrows	Can-Am	1	0	0	0	0	—	—	—	—	—
1934–35	Philadelphia Arrows	Can-Am	12	0	0	0	0	—	—	—	—	—
WCHL totals			130	33	18	51	47	11	3	1	4	0
NHL totals			108	10	9	19	59	9	0	1	1	16

== Coaching record ==
Team	Year	Regular season						Postseason
Team	Year	G	W	L	T	Pts	Division rank	Result
Chicago Black Hawks	1928–29	32	5	23	4	14	5th in American	(Fired)
Total		32	5	23	4	14		

=== College ===
Record table
Season	Team	Overall	Conference	Standing	Postseason
Pennsylvania Quakers Independent (1929–1929)
1929–30	Pennsylvania	0–1–0†			
Pennsylvania:		0–1–0			
Total:		0–1–0			
National champion Postseason invitational champion Conference regular season champion Conference regular season and conference tournament champion Division regular season champion Division regular season and conference tournament champion Conference tournament champion

† Gardiner coached the Penn team for 1 games before turning control over to William Farson.

Awards and achievements
Preceded by Nels Stewart	Winner of the Hart Trophy; 1927	Succeeded by Howie Morenz
Preceded by Hughie Lehman	Head coach of the Chicago Black Hawks; 1928–29	Succeeded by Dick Irvin
