= Barney Stanley =

Canadian ice hockey player (1893–1971)

- Hockey Hall of Fame, 1963
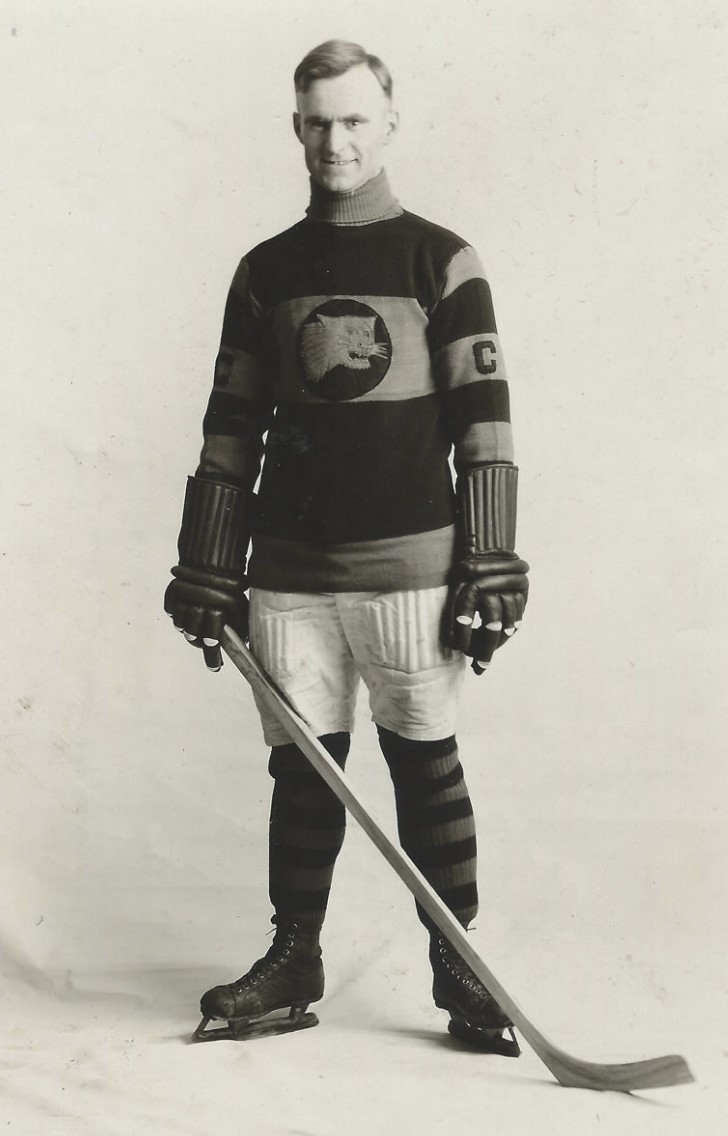
- Stanley with the Calgary Tigers in 1921
- Born: June 1, 1893 Paisley, Ontario, Canada
- Died: May 16, 1971 (aged 77) Edmonton, Alberta, Canada
- Height: 6 ft 0 in (183 cm)
- Weight: 175 lb (79 kg; 12 st 7 lb)
- Position: Right wing
- Shot: Left
- Played for: Vancouver Millionaires; Calgary Tigers; Regina Capitals; Edmonton Eskimos; Chicago Black Hawks
- Playing career: 1911–1929

Russell "Barney" Stanley (June 1, 1893 – May 16, 1971) was a Canadian professional ice hockey forward who played for the Vancouver Millionaires of the Pacific Coast Hockey Association (PCHA) and the Calgary Tigers, Regina Capitals and Edmonton Eskimos of the Western Canada Hockey League (WCHL). He was the second head coach of the Chicago Black Hawks of the National Hockey League (NHL). He won the Stanley Cup with the Millionaires in 1915 and was inducted into the Hockey Hall of Fame in 1963.

== Playing career ==
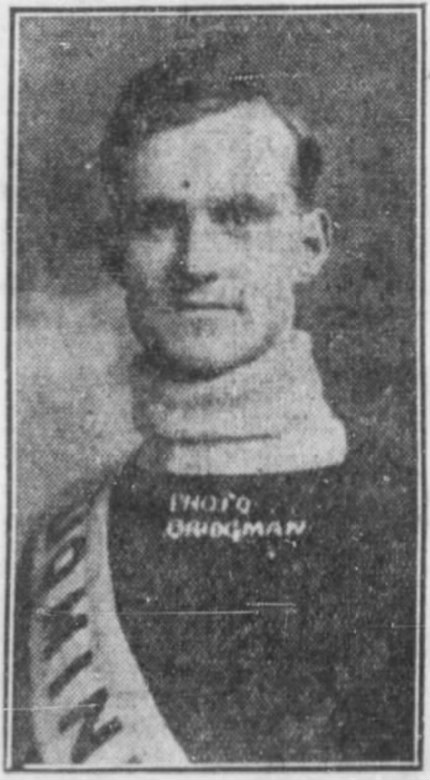
Stanley with the Edmonton Dominions

Stanley was born in Paisley, Ontario, the son of a dairy farmer. He moved west to Medicine Hat, Alberta at 17 to play hockey before settling in Edmonton. He joined the Edmonton Maritimers in 1911–12, then spent the next three seasons as both a player and coach for the Edmonton Dominions and Albertas, all of the Alberta Senior Hockey League. Stanley turned professional in 1915, joining the Vancouver Millionaires of the PCHA. Stanley scored seven goals in his first five regular season contests with Vancouver, of which his first professional goal, in his first game, was assisted by Cyclone Taylor. He won the Stanley Cup with the Millionaires in 1915 as they defeated the Ottawa Senators of the National Hockey League for the Canadian championship. Stanley scored four goals in the third and deciding game of the series.

Stanley was a Second Team All-Star with the Millionaires in 1918 and remained with the team until the end of the 1919–20 season. He then fought to regain his amateur status so that he could take on the role of player-coach with the Edmonton Eskimos of Alberta's Big-4 League. He left the Eskimos after one year to join the Calgary Tigers and in 1921 once again turned professional as the Tigers joined the newly formed Western Canada Hockey League. He scored 26 goals in 24 games for the Tigers in 1921–22 and was named a league all-star on right wing. His rights were sold to the Regina Capitals following the season where he served as player-coach and was again named the right wing all-star. After two seasons in Regina, he returned to the Eskimos for two more. As player-coach for the Eskimos, Stanley led the team to the top record in the league in 1925–26.

Following the collapse of the WCHL in 1926, Stanley purchased the Eskimos and brought them into the newly formed Prairie Hockey League. Before the season began, however, he sold the team and joined the Winnipeg Maroons. He purchased an ownership stake in the franchise, and signed on as a defenceman and coach for the American Hockey Association team.

Stanley was hired by the Chicago Black Hawks to be their manager and head coach for the 1927–28 NHL season. He managed the club for only 23 games as the team replaced him following a 4–17–2 start to the season, but not before appearing in one regular season contest as a player with the team. Stanley returned to the AHA, playing his final season of hockey with the Minneapolis Millers before retiring in 1929. He was inducted into the Hockey Hall of Fame in 1963.

== Personal life ==
Stanley and his wife Muriel Frances (née Sparling) had four children: son Don and daughters Isobel, Dorothy and Frances. Following the death of his first wife in 1951, Stanley married Margaret (Greta) Muir. He had three brothers and a sister. His son was also a hockey player and was a member of Canada's 1950 World Championship team while his nephew Allan Stanley is also a member of the Hockey Hall of Fame.

Following his arrival in Edmonton, Stanley became involved in the dairy industry. He first joined the Edmonton City Dairy in 1913, and remained with the firm for 11 years while he remained an active hockey player. He purchased a share in a dairy farm in 1924, and joined the Northern Alberta Dairy Pool as an assistant manager in 1929 following the conclusion of his playing career. In 1944 he became the general manager of the pool. He held the position until his retirement in 1961.

Remaining active in hockey, Stanley coached the Edmonton Poolers junior team between 1929 and 1933, with Art Potter as his team's manager. He was a member of the hockey committee of the Edmonton Exhibition Association when the Flyers won the Allan Cup national senior championship in 1948. Stanley also designed one of the sport's first hockey helmets, presented to the NHL's board of governors without interest after Chicago's Dick Irvin suffered a fractured skull during a game. A proponent of youth involvement in sport, Stanley served two years as president of Edmonton's junior baseball league, and was also president of the Edmonton and District Hockey Association into the 1940s.

== Career statistics ==
=== Regular season and playoffs ===
			Regular season					Playoffs
Season	Team	League	GP	G	A	Pts	PIM	GP	G	A	Pts	PIM
1914–15	Vancouver Millionaires	PCHA	5	7	1	8	0	3	5	1	6	0
1915–16	Vancouver Millionaires	PCHA	14	6	6	12	9	—	—	—	—	—
1916–17	Vancouver Millionaires	PCHA	23	28	18	46	9	—	—	—	—	—
1917–18	Vancouver Millionaires	PCHA	18	11	6	17	9	7	3	0	3	9
1918–19	Vancouver Millionaires	PCHA	20	10	6	16	19	2	0	0	0	0
1919–20	Edmonton Eskimos	Big-4	12	10	12	22	20	2	0	1	1	5
1920–21	Calgary Tigers	Big-4	15	11	10	21	5	—	—	—	—	—
1921–22	Calgary Tigers	WCHL	24	26	5	31	17	2	0	0	0	0
1922–23	Regina Capitals	WCHL	29	14	7	21	10	2	1	0	1	2
1923–24	Regina Capitals	WCHL	30	15	11	26	27	2	1	0	1	0
1924–25	Edmonton Eskimos	WCHL	25	12	5	17	36	—	—	—	—	—
1925–26	Edmonton Eskimos	WHL	29	14	8	22	47	2	1	0	1	2
1926–27	Winnipeg Maroons	AHA	35	8	8	16	78	3	0	0	0	2
1927–28	Chicago Black Hawks	NHL	1	0	0	0	0	—	—	—	—	—
1928–29	Minneapolis Millers	AHA	40	8	5	13	34	4	1	0	1	2
PCHA totals			80	62	37	99	46	12	8	1	9	9
WCHL totals			137	81	36	117	137	8	3	0	3	4
NHL totals			1	0	0	0	0	—	—	—	—	—

=== Coaching record ===
			Regular season					Playoffs
Season	Team	League	GC	W	L	T	Finish	GC	W	L	T	Result
1927–28	Chicago Black Hawks	NHL	23	4	17	2	—	—	—	—	—	—
NHL totals			23	4	17	2	—	—	—	—	—	—

== See also ==
- List of players who played only one game in the NHL

Preceded by Pete Muldoon	Head coach of the Chicago Black Hawks; 1927–28	Succeeded by Hughie Lehman
