= Calgary Tigers =

Canadian ice hockey team (1920–1927)

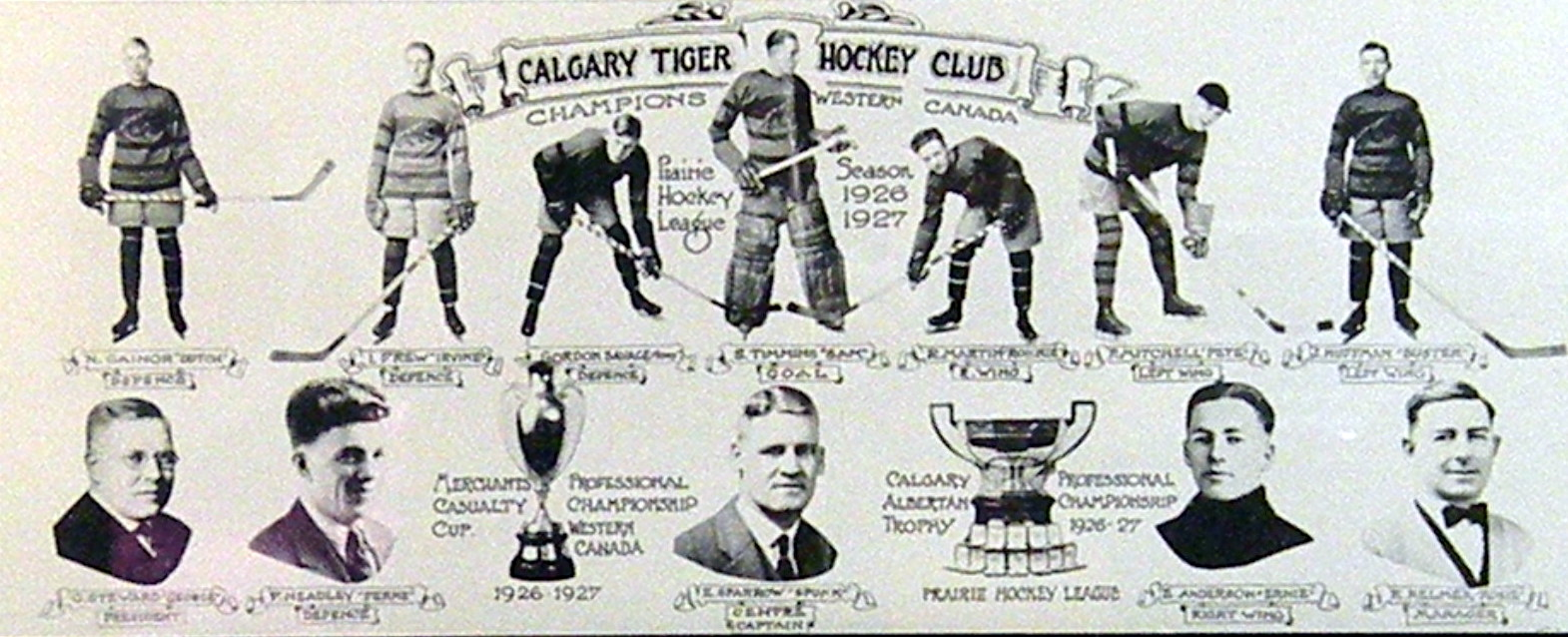
- City: Calgary, Alberta
- League: Big-4 League; Western Canada Hockey League; Prairie Hockey League; North West Hockey League
- Operated: 1920–1927; 1932–1936
- Home arena: Victoria Arena
- Colours: Yellow, black

The Calgary Tigers, often nicknamed the Bengals, were an ice hockey team based in Calgary, Alberta, Canada, from 1920 until 1927 as members of the Big-4 League, Western Canada Hockey League and Prairie Hockey League. The Tigers were revived in 1932, playing for a short-lived four years in the North Western Hockey League. They played their games at the Victoria Arena.

Created ostensibly as an amateur team in hopes of competing for the Allan Cup, the Tigers helped form the Western Canada Hockey League in 1921 to become the first major professional team in Calgary. In 1924, after winning both the league and Western Canadian championships, the Tigers became the first Calgary based club to compete for the Stanley Cup.

After succumbing to financial pressures in 1927, the Tigers were briefly revived in the mid-1930s as a minor professional club. The Tigers competed for a total of eleven seasons in four leagues, winning four championships during their existence. Five Tigers players would later gain election to the Hockey Hall of Fame.

== History ==
=== Big-4 League ===
In 1919, under the guidance of Alberta Amateur Hockey Association league president Allan McCaw, a new elite senior amateur league was established in Alberta with two teams each in Calgary and Edmonton. The Big-4 League's intention was to compete for the Allan Cup, emblematic of Canada's national senior championship. The Tigers were created in 1920, along with the Canadians, to represent Calgary in the Big Four after the city's two original teams, the Wanderers and Columbus Crew, withdrew following the league's first season. The Tigers also faced the Edmonton Eskimos and Dominions who served as representatives of Alberta's capital. The Calgary teams were hosted at the Victoria Arena, which had been converted into a hockey rink in 1918.

While the Big-4 billed itself as an amateur circuit, it became known as a notorious example of a "shamateur" league, as amateur teams secretly employed professional players in an attempt to gain an upper hand on their competition. When the Big Four announced their intention to compete in the Allan Cup playdowns, the Pacific Coast Hockey Association sent a letter of protest to the Canadian Amateur Hockey Association demanding that the league be declared professional, thus ineligible to compete for the Allan Cup. The Big Four ultimately chose to withdraw from the AAHA, and operated as an independent league in 1920–21.

The Tigers' inaugural game was played at home on December 29, 1920, as 2,500 fans saw them defeat the Edmonton Dominions 6–1 on the strength of a goal and two assists by Gordon Fraser. Late in the season, the Canadians protested the use of goaltender Bill Tobin by the Edmonton Eskimos, arguing that he had not lived in Alberta long enough to be eligible per the league's residency rules. Following a last minute change of one of the arbitrators, a three-man panel denied the protest. The decision led the front-running Tigers to refuse to play any series against the second-place Eskimos for the league championship as the team felt the Canadians' protest was improperly handled. Efforts to reach a compromise failed as the Edmonton clubs refused to allow the protest to be reconsidered, resulting in the collapse of the league on February 24, 1921.

The Tigers remained active despite the demise of the league, playing a series of exhibition games against the Saskatoon Crescents and a team from Moose Jaw. The Eskimos eventually agreed to face the Tigers without Tobin in an informal championship that was known as the Intercity Championship. The Tigers claimed the title on total-goals as they defeated Edmonton 2–0 in the first game at Calgary before dropping the second 2–1 at Edmonton. The Tigers ended their season with a 2–0 exhibition loss to the defending Stanley Cup champion Ottawa Senators, who were touring the country as they travelled west to defend their title against the PCHA champion Vancouver Millionaires.

=== Western Canada Hockey League ===
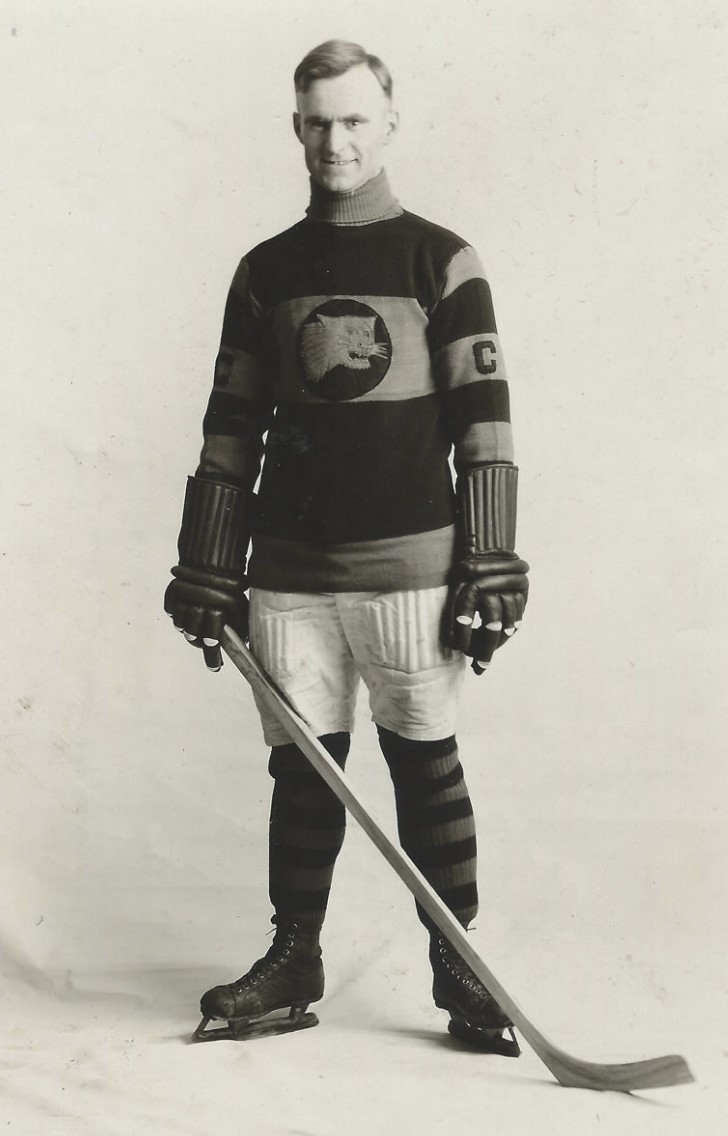
Hockey Hall of Famer Barney Stanley

The former Big Four teams joined with the Saskatoon Sheiks in forming a new professional league in 1921 that intended to compete against the National Hockey League and Pacific Coast Hockey Association. The Western Canada Hockey League was recognized as a major league and granted the right to compete for the Stanley Cup. Shortly before the inaugural season was set to begin, Calgary Canadians president Dr. C.E. Coleman and Tigers manager Eddie Poulin agreed amalgamate the two franchises under the Tigers name, allowing Calgary to present a unified front in the new league.

The Tigers played the first professional hockey game in Calgary on December 19, 1921, defeating the Regina Capitals 3–2 before a crowd of 3,000 fans. The Tigers, Eskimos and Capitals battled for first place in the league, each team holding the top spot numerous times throughout the season. The Tigers and Capitals finished tied for second, forcing a two-game, total-goals playoff to determine who would meet the Eskimos for the league championship. In the series, the Capitals defeated the Tigers 1–0 in Calgary, while the two teams tied 1–1 in Regina sending the Capitals through by a 2–1 aggregate total.

Prior to the start of the 1922–23 season, the Tigers faced the Stanley Cup champion Toronto St. Patricks in two exhibition games. They defeated the St. Pats 7–5 in Calgary, and again 6–2 in a game held in Winnipeg, Manitoba. The WCHL and PCHA adopted an interlocking schedule for this season, with the Tigers struggling against their pacific coast opposition, winning just two of six games. Calgary finished third in the standings, behind Edmonton and Regina, as former Tiger Barney Stanley scored the winning goal against Calgary in a 2–1 victory by the Regina Capitals that eliminated Calgary from playoff contention. They ended the season with a 4–0 exhibition victory over the NHL's Ottawa Senators in a game described as one of the "most sensational" games ever held in Calgary.

Conquering Regina 2–0 in the most vicious hockey battle ever unfolded before a Calgary audience, the Tigers attained the premier seat in the Western Canada League last night, and today they proudly waive the championship ribbons in the face of the opposition that has fallen behind them on the track that has been sprinkled with red. Red it was, and blood red, for there was much gore spilled in last night's duel.

— The Calgary Herald's description of the Tigers 1924 WCHL championship victory.

The 1923–24 season began with tragedy, as Tigers' forward Foley Martin died of blood poisoning during the team's season opening road trip to the pacific coast. The Tigers played on despite Martin's death, winning two of three games against their PCHA rivals. The Tigers finished atop the league standings with 37 points. They met the Regina Capitals in the league championship in a two-game, total goals series. After battling Regina to a 2–2 draw in the Saskatchewan capital, the Tigers returned home to Calgary, capturing the championship on home ice in a 2–0 victory. They then moved on to face the Vancouver Maroons of the PCHA in the best-of-three Western Canadian final. After dropping the first game in Vancouver, the Tigers came back to defeat the Maroons 6–3 at home, and again 3–1 at a neutral site game in Winnipeg, Manitoba. The victory earned the Tigers the right to play for the Stanley Cup, the first such opportunity for a Calgary-based club.

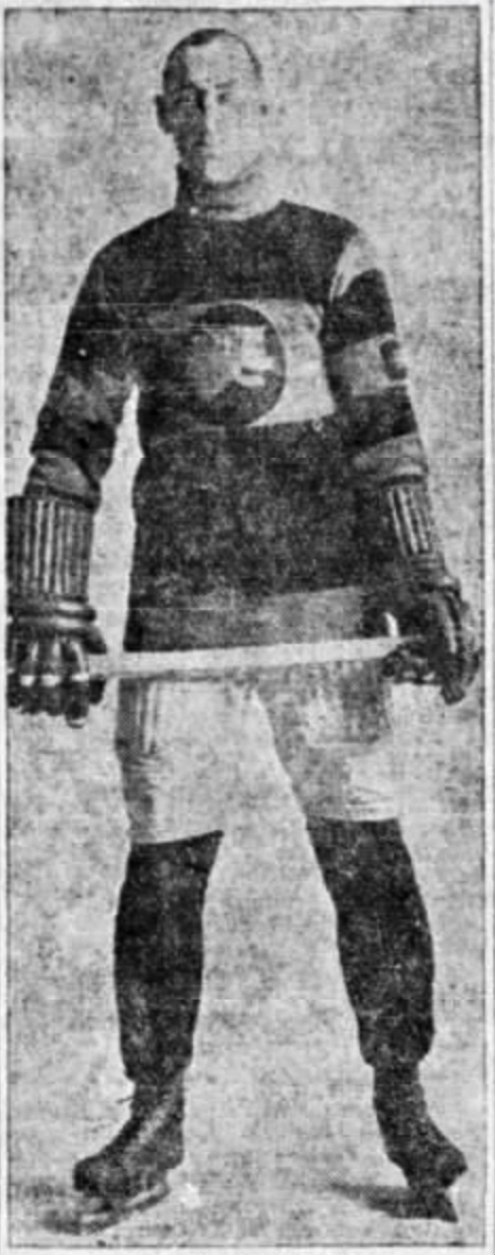
Calgary Tigers defenceman Herb Gardiner

Despite defeating the Maroons, the PCHA champions were not eliminated. Rather, the Tigers earned a bye into the finals, while Vancouver met the Montreal Canadiens in the semi-final. The blue, blanc et rouge swept Vancouver in two games, setting the matchup for the 1924 Stanley Cup Finals where the Canadiens easily handled the Tigers. In the first game, played at Mount Royal Arena in Montreal, Canadiens rookie Howie Morenz recorded a hat trick as Montreal won 6–1. Due to poor ice conditions, the second game was moved to the Ottawa Auditorium in Ottawa. Led by goaltender Georges Vezina, Montreal won 3–0 to sweep the series, and claim the Cup.

Calgary began the 1924–25 season with a series of exhibition games in eastern Canada. They faced the St. Pats and Senators, proving to be a popular draw in the capital as Ottawa fans lined up for tickets for the pair of games played. Additionally, the Tigers negotiated to face the NHL's expansion Montreal Maroons if the newly constructed Montreal Forum was ready in time. Those games did not come to pass. In WCHL league play, the Tigers once again finished the regular season in first place. Led by Oliver's team leading 20 goals, the Tigers earned a bye into the WCHL championship. Their opponent was the Victoria Cougars, who moved over to the WCHL following the collapse of the PCHA the previous summer. The Tigers were unable to earn a return trip to the Stanley Cup Finals, losing the two-game total-goals series 3–1. The Cougars went on to become the last non-NHL team to win the Stanley Cup. The Tigers struggled throughout the 1925–26 season, languishing in last place for most of the season until a 2–0 victory over Victoria on the last day of the season moved Calgary one point ahead of Vancouver to end the season.

The financial pressures of trying to keep up with rapidly escalating salaries took its toll on the league. The prairie clubs, including the Tigers, were struggling under financial hardships while a mild winter of 1925–26 reduced the quality of the natural ice at Victoria arena which, coupled with the team's poor performance, reduced attendance. Manager Lance Turner confirmed on May 4, 1926, that the Tigers were sold to the National Hockey League, along with the franchises in Edmonton, Regina, Victoria, Vancouver and Portland, and that the league had ceased operations. The six franchises were sold for $300,000.

Turner immediately began efforts to form a new team and league that would operate as a "class B" league, one level below the NHL. Three weeks after the collapse of the Western League, the Tigers were reformed as a charter member of the five team Prairie Hockey League. The team struggled to attract fans in the Prairie League, and consequently announced late in the season that it would cease operations after one year. The Tigers were successful on the ice, however, as they finished atop the league standings and met the Saskatoon Sheiks in a best-of-three series for the league title. Calgary dropped the first game, 2–1 in Saskatoon, but tied the series with a 2–1 victory in Calgary on the strength of two goals in the last five minutes by Andy Aikenhead. The Tigers were then awarded the league championship after the Sheiks defaulted the third game, refusing to play in opposition to the referee assigned for the deciding game. As Prairie champions, the Tigers traveled east to face the Winnipeg Maroons for the western Canadian professional championship. Calgary won the first game, then were awarded the title after the Maroons were unable to play the second game when the American Hockey Association rescheduled their league playoff series and created a conflict. The Tigers ended their season with exhibition games in the United States before the team was disbanded.

=== North Western Hockey League ===
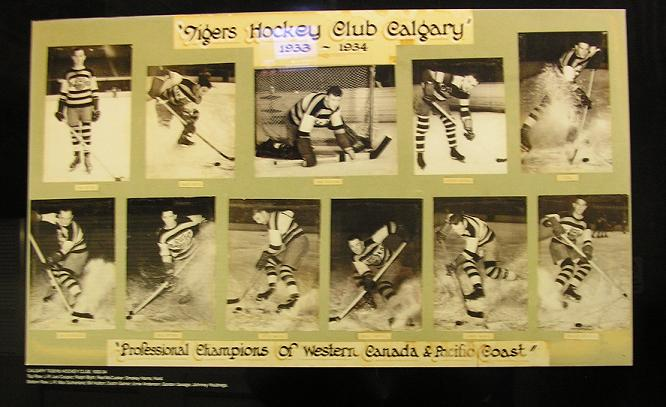
1933–34 Tigers team photo as part of a hockey retrospective at the Scotiabank Saddledome

In 1932, the Tigers were revived as a charter franchise of a reformed, minor-professional, Western Canada Hockey League. They opened the season with a 1–0 defeat in Edmonton on December 7, 1932, in what was the first professional game for either city in six years, while a near capacity crowd of 4,100 fans witnessed a 7–0 victory by the Tigers over the Eskimos two nights later in Calgary. The Tigers finished the season in first place with on the strength of giving up the fewest goals against during the season, but struggled to attract fans. Attendance declined throughout the season to a low of just 560 for their victory over Saskatoon in early March that clinched the league's top record. Overall, the team averaged 2,270 fans per game. Having earned a bye to the championship series, the Tigers faced the Eskimos in a best-of-five series marred by poor ice caused unseasonably warm weather in both cities. Following a 1–1 tie in the first game at Calgary, the league ordered the remaining games of the series be played in Edmonton due to the poor condition of the ice surface. The second game was also tied at 1 after bad ice in Edmonton forced it to be ended early. Two victories for the Eskimos pushed Calgary to the brink of elimination before the Tigers rebounded with a 5–1 victory in the fifth game. The ties earlier in the series forced the teams to a sixth game that also went to overtime tied at 1 before the Eskimos scored to win the championship after four minutes of an extra period.

The league reformed as the North Western Hockey League following the season after the Saskatchewan clubs dropped out and were replaced with three teams on the Pacific Coast. Calgary again won the regular-season title in 1933–34, advancing directly to the league championship, on the strength of a 12–3 victory over the Vancouver Lions in the final game of the regular season. Dutch Gainor won the league scoring title with 43 points. Fearing a repeat of the previous season's playoff disaster, the league ordered Calgary to play their championship series against the Lions in Seattle and Vancouver as both cities had arenas capable of making artificial ice. The disadvantage did not affect the Tigers in the opening game of the series, a 5–2 victory at Seattle. The teams traded victories in the next three contests, ending in a 2–1 Vancouver win in the fourth game that tied the series at 2 wins apiece. Calgary won the championship with a 6–1 victory before a Vancouver crowd of over 6,000 fans.

The 1934 championship would prove to be the Tigers' last hurrah, as the team fell to the bottom of the NWHL standings in 1934–35, winning only three games. They once again finished in last place in 1935–36 and were embroiled in another disputer with Edmonton over the rights to a player as the Eskimos claimed they had gained the rights to Tony Savage from the Montreal Canadiens though he had already been sent to Calgary on loan. The Tigers issued an ultimatum to the league, threatening to disband for the season if Savage did not remain in Calgary. Savage ultimately remained with Calgary for the entire season.

1936 proved to be the final year for the Tigers, as the Great Depression and declining interest in professional hockey in favour of the senior game had threatened the team's viability. After the Eskimos announced intentions to relocate to Victoria, British Columbia, as part of a realignment of the league, Tigers' manager Clair Manning contemplated relocating the franchise to Spokane, Washington. The team instead hoped to operate for another season in Calgary, but met its final demise after the NWHL reformed into the Pacific Coast Hockey League for 1936–37 and denied the Tigers' application to join the new league.

== Season-by-season record ==
Note: GP = Games played, W = Wins, L = Losses, T = Ties, Pts = Points, GF = Goals for, GA = Goals against

| Season | League | GP | W | L | T | Pts | GF | GA | Finish | Playoffs |
|---|---|---|---|---|---|---|---|---|---|---|
| 1920–21 | Big-4 | 15^{†} | 10 | 4 | 1 | 21 | 61 | 45 | 1st overall | Won Intercity championship |
| 1921–22 | WCHL | 24 | 14 | 10 | 0 | 28 | 75 | 62 | T-2nd overall | Lost semi-final |
| 1922–23 | WCHL | 30 | 12 | 18 | 0 | 24 | 91 | 106 | 3rd overall | Did not qualify |
| 1923–24 | WCHL | 30 | 18 | 11 | 1 | 37 | 83 | 72 | 1st overall | Won championship Lost Stanley Cup |
| 1924–25 | WCHL | 28 | 17 | 11 | 0 | 34 | 95 | 79 | 1st overall | Lost final |
| 1925–26 | WHL | 30 | 10 | 17 | 3 | 23 | 71 | 80 | 5th overall | Did not qualify |
| 1926–27 | PrHL | 32 | 22 | 9 | 1 | 45 | 119 | 68 | 1st overall | Won championship |
| 1932–33 | WCHL | 30 | 16 | 10 | 4 | 36 | 70 | 61 | 1st overall | Lost final |
| 1933–34 | NWHL | 34 | 17 | 11 | 6 | 40 | 117 | 76 | 1st overall | Won championship |
| 1934–35 | NWHL | 26 | 3 | 15 | 8 | 14 | 60 | 104 | 5th overall | Did not qualify |
| 1935–36 | NWHL | 40 | 15 | 21 | 4 | 34 | 107 | 141 | 5th overall | Did not qualify |

^{†}Denotes Tigers' record when the league collapsed. Exhibition games played after are not included

== Hall of Famers ==
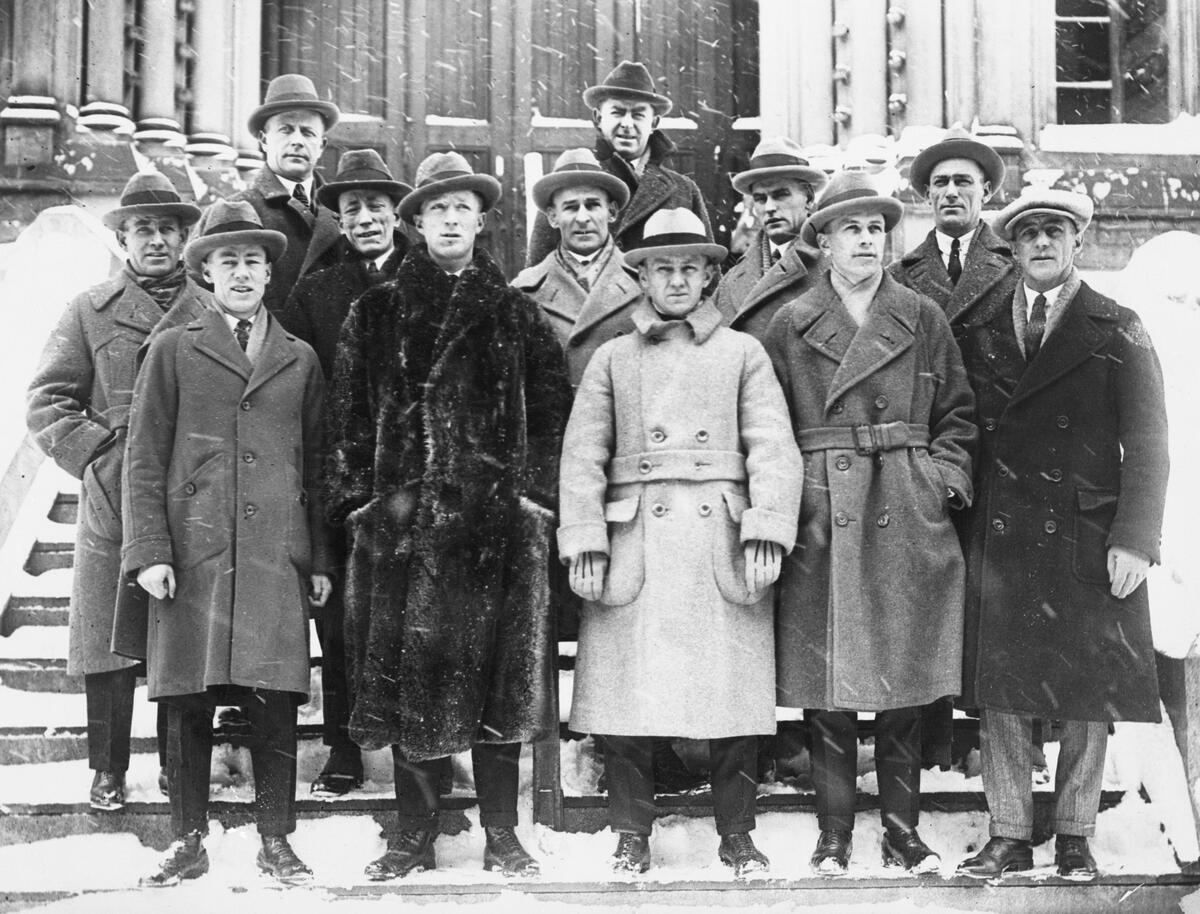
The Tigers's players pose in Montreal prior to the 1924 Stanley Cup Finals.

The WCHL's short and unstable existence was a result of salary escalation caused by having three leagues competing for top talent. As a result, by the mid-1920s, hockey players were among the highest paid athletes in North America, with top players able to demand even higher salaries than the top baseball stars of the time. Though the WCHL lasted only five years, the Tigers boasted five future Hockey Hall of Famers on their roster during that time.

Barney Stanley, a former PCHA star, spent two seasons with the Tigers from 1920 to 1922. Joining the Tigers in the last season of the Big Four League, he once again turned pro when the Tigers joined the WCHL. Stanley led the Tigers in scoring with 26 goals in 1921–22 before being traded to Regina. Red Dutton, a World War I veteran who refused doctors orders to have his leg amputated after suffering a shrapnel wound, played 123 games with the Tigers before moving to the NHL where he played 449 more with the Montreal Maroons and New York Americans. Rusty Crawford, a former standout in the National Hockey Association and National Hockey League before the war, spent three seasons in Calgary from 1922 to 1925. Crawford recorded 19 goals in 64 games as a Tiger.

Herb Gardiner began his professional career in Calgary in 1920, remaining with the Tigers until he was sold to the Montreal Canadiens in 1926, where he would go on to win the Hart Memorial Trophy as NHL Most Valuable Player in 1927. Harry Oliver also began his pro career in Calgary, playing with the Tigers from 1921 to 1926 where he scored 90 goals before being sold to the Boston Bruins. Oliver would go on to play eleven seasons in the NHL with the Bruins and New York Americans.

== Head coaches ==
- Barney Stanley (1921–1922)
- Herb Gardiner (1922–1926)

== Legacy ==
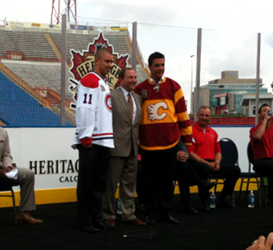
On February 20, 2011, the Calgary Flames wore a "heritage" uniform in the colour and style of the Calgary Tigers for a game at McMahon Stadium against the Montreal Canadiens.

The uniform of the Calgary Tigers served as the inspiration for the "vintage" uniform of the Calgary Flames which was worn in the Heritage Classic game in February 2011. While the Calgary Flames do not trace their ancestry back to the Tigers (the Atlanta Flames club was purchased by Calgary businessmen in the 1980s), the organization had wanted to recognize the first professional hockey club in Calgary history for this event and selected the colourful uniforms of the Tigers.

== See also ==
- List of ice hockey teams in Alberta
- Ice hockey in Calgary
- Calgary Cowboys
- Calgary Flames
