= 1924 Stanley Cup Final =

1924 ice hockey championship series

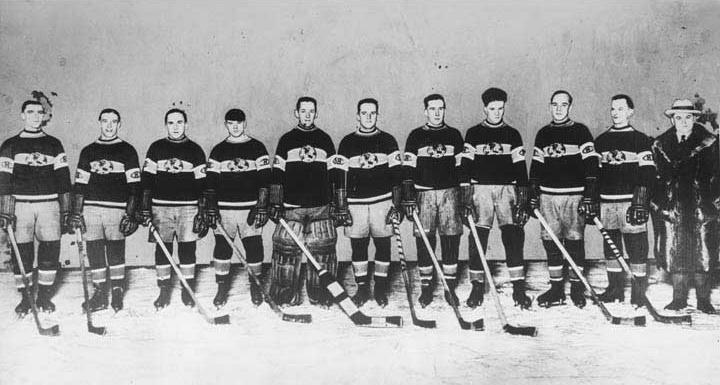
- The Canadiens in a group photo after winning the Cup
	1	2	Total
Montreal Canadiens (NHL)	6	3	2
Calgary Tigers (WCHL)	1	0	0
- Location(s): Montreal: Mount Royal Arena (1); Ottawa: Ottawa Auditorium (2)
- Format: best-of-three
- Coaches: Montreal: Leo Dandurand; Calgary: Eddie Oatman
- Captains: Montreal: Sprague Cleghorn; Calgary: Red Dutton
- Dates: March 22–25, 1924
- Series-winning goal: Howie Morenz (4:55, first)
- Hall of Famers: Canadiens: Sprague Cleghorn (1958); Aurele Joliat (1947); Joe Malone (1950); Sylvio Mantha (1960); Howie Morenz (1945); Georges Vezina (1945); Tigers: Rusty Crawford (1963); Red Dutton (1958); Herb Gardiner (1958); Harry Oliver (1967); Coaches: Leo Dandurand (1963)

The 1924 Stanley Cup Final saw the National Hockey League (NHL) champion Montreal Canadiens defeat the Western Canada Hockey League (WCHL) champion Calgary Tigers two games to none in the best-of-three-game series. It was Montreal's fourth appearance in the Finals and second championship.

This was the last Final until the 1983 Stanley Cup Final to be contested by a team from Alberta and the last Final until 1986 to be contested by a team from Calgary.

== Paths to the Final ==
As in 1922, the PCHA champion met the WCHL champion in a playoff, with the winner to meet the NHL champion in the Final. That series was held in Vancouver, Calgary and Winnipeg. The NHL champion would have to play the loser to advance to the Final. Montreal first played the Vancouver Maroons, defeating them 2–0 in a best-of-three to advance to the Final.

== Game summaries ==
The first game was played in Montreal's Mount Royal Arena on slushy natural ice caused by warmer than usual weather. The second game was moved to Ottawa, to take advantage of the artificial ice.

Rookie forward Howie Morenz scored a hat trick in game one and a further goal in game two to lead the Canadiens. Morenz also was leveled by Calgary defenceman Herb Gardiner in game two and suffered torn shoulder ligaments and a chipped collarbone. Red Dutton played a robust game for Calgary in a losing cause and Joliat and Billy Boucher were hard pressed to get scoring chances. Georges Vezina was brilliant in getting his 3-0 shutout victory that brought the Stanley Cup to Montreal for the first time in eight years.

March 22	Calgary Tigers	1–6	Montreal Canadiens	Mount Royal Arena	Recap
No scoring		First period	19:10 – Howie Morenz (4)
Herb Gardiner (1) – 19:30		Second period	00:40 – Howie Morenz (5); 11:20 – Billy Boucher (5); 15:55 – Howie Morenz (6)
No scoring		Third period	03:40 – Aurele Joliat (3); 04:50 – Sprague Cleghorn (2)
Charlie Reid		Goalie stats	Georges Vezina

March 25	Calgary Tigers	0–3	Montreal Canadiens	Ottawa Auditorium	Recap
No scoring		First period	04:55 – Howie Morenz (7)
No scoring		Second period	No scoring
No scoring		Third period	03:30 – Billy Boucher (6); 13:50 – Aurele Joliat (4)
Charlie Reid		Goalie stats	Georges Vezina

Montreal won series 2–0

== Stanley Cup engraving ==
The 1924 Stanley Cup was presented by the trophy's trustee William Foran to the Canadiens at a banquet at the Windsor Hotel in Montreal on April 1, 1924.

The following Canadiens players and staff had their names engraved on the Stanley Cup

1923–24 Montreal Canadiens

=== Players ===
Centres

- 7 Howie Morenz
- 5-9 Billy Bell
- 9 Joe Malone&

Wingers

- 4 Aurel Joliat
- 5-13 Billy Boucher
- 10 Billy Cameron
- 11 Bobby Boucher

Defencemen

- 2 Sprague Cleghorn (captain)
- 3 Wilfred Billy Coutu "Coulter"
- 6 Ogilvie Odie Cleghorn
- 8 Sylvio Mantha

Goaltenders

- 1 Georges Vezina

=== Coaching and administrative staff ===
- Edward Dulfour (Trainer),
- Louis Athanase David (Executive Director)
- Joseph Cattarinich (Vice President/Owner)
- Hilarion A. "Louis" Letourneau (Director/Owner)
- Joseph Viateur "Leo" Dandurand (President/Owner/Manager-Coach)
- Napoleon Norval (Secretary)
- Edouard C. St. Pere, Harry Elliot, Cecil Hart, Ferdinand Rinfeet (Directors)

& not engraved on Cup.

=== Stanley Cup engraving ===
- Billy Coutu's last name was often missept Billy Couture.
- After a ring was added to the original Stanley Cup in 1909, the winners were engraved on the ring until 1918 (except the 1910 Montreal Wanderers and 1911 Ottawa Senators). No new ring was added until after the 1924 victory, when the Canadiens added a new ring to the bottom.
- On this new ring, the club had the majority of its members' names engraved on it with a letter punch. It became an annual tradition. Each Stanley Cup-winning team since 1924 has engraved its members' names on the Cup. The NHL controls the number of names allowed.
- Joe Malone, who had not played in the playoffs, was not included on the Cup, even though there was room. Malone retired from hockey mid-season. Only Bobby Boucher, Ed Dulfour, Leo Danduran, and Cecil Hart have their full first names engraved on the cup. All other members had their first names shortened. Montreal also included the three teams they defeated in the playoffs, Ottawa, Vancouver, Calgary, two straight games.
- Charles Fortier used to be credited with playing one NHL game for Montreal. He did not, but he did attend the Canadiens' 1923-24 training camp. Since Frotier was never on the Montreal Canadiens roster, he is not a Stanley Cup winner in 1924.

== See also ==
- 1923–24 NHL season
- 1923–24 WCHL season
- 1923–24 Montreal Canadiens season

Preceded by Ottawa Senators; 1923	Montreal Canadiens; Stanley Cup champions 1924	Succeeded by Victoria Cougars; 1925
