= Cleveland Barons (2001–2006) =

American Hockey League team (2001–2006)

- City: Cleveland, Ohio
- League: American Hockey League
- Operated: 2001–2006
- Home arena: Gund Arena
- Colors: Teal, black
- Affiliates: San Jose Sharks

Franchise history
- 1996–2001: Kentucky Thoroughblades
- 2001–2006: Cleveland Barons
- 2006–2015: Worcester Sharks
- 2015–present: San Jose Barracuda

The Cleveland Barons were a professional American ice hockey team in the American Hockey League. They played in Cleveland, Ohio, at Gund Arena between 2001 and 2006.

== History ==
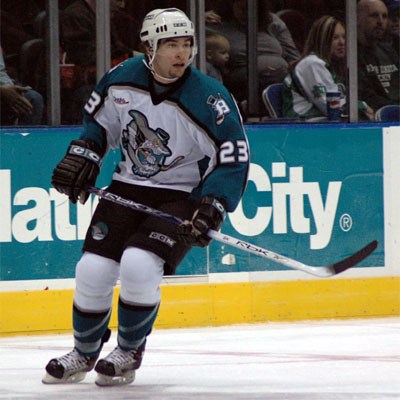
Josh Hennessy with the Barons

The team was named in honor of the popular Barons team that played in the AHL and its forerunners from 1929 to 1973 and the National Hockey League (NHL) team of the same name. The Barons name was revived in 2001 when the San Jose Sharks purchased their AHL affiliate, the Kentucky Thoroughblades, and relocated them to Cleveland, where they would play at the arena which was owned and operated by Sharks owners George and Gordon Gund. The Gunds had also owned the NHL Barons, who played in the NHL in the late 1970s before being merged with the Minnesota North Stars in 1978.

The franchise relocated to Worcester, Massachusetts, for the 2006–07 season and became the Worcester Sharks. Dan Gilbert, owner of the Cleveland Cavaliers of the National Basketball Association (NBA), purchased the inactive Utah Grizzlies AHL franchise and moved it to Cleveland. Renamed the Lake Erie Monsters, the club resumed play in 2007 and then rebranded as the Cleveland Monsters in 2016.

The team logo, a shark holding a hockey stick, was originally designed as an alternate logo for the San Jose Sharks before being modified with a top hat, a monocle, and formal wear for the Barons.

This market was previously served by:

- Cleveland Indians/Falcons/Barons (1929–1973) IHL/IAHL/AHL
- Cleveland Crusaders (1972–1976) WHA
- Cleveland Barons (NHL) (1976–1978)
- Cleveland Lumberjacks (1992–2001) IHL

This market is now the home to:

- Lake Erie/Cleveland Monsters (2007–present)

Affiliates

- San Jose Sharks (2001-2006)

== Season-by-season results ==
=== Regular season ===
Season	Games	Won	Lost	Tied	OTL	SOL	Points	Goals for	Goals against	Standing	Avg. attendance
2001–02	80	29	40	7	4	—	69	223	268	4th, Central	3,226
2002–03	80	22	48	5	5	—	54	203	286	5th, Central	3,561
2003–04	80	37	28	8	7	—	89	235	220	4th, North	4,212
2004–05	80	35	37	6	2	—	78	200	226	7th, North	4,178
2005–06	80	27	48	—	2	3	59	210	302	7th, North	3,548

=== Playoffs ===
Season	Prelim	1st round	2nd round	3rd round	Finals
2001–02	Out of Playoffs				
2002–03	Out of Playoffs				
2003–04	W, 2–1, Toronto	L, 2–4, Hamilton	—	—	—
2004–05	Out of Playoffs				
2005–06	Out of Playoffs				

== Team records ==
=== Single Season ===
Goals: 35 Mike Craig (2001–02), Miroslav Zalesak (2003–04)
Assists: 48 Jeff Nelson (2002–03)
Points: 75 Miroslav Zalesak (2003–04)
Points, Defenseman: 46 Garrett Stafford (2003-04)
Penalty Minutes: 335 Matt Carkner (2001–02)
Wins: 19 Vesa Toskala (2001–02)
GAA: 2.34 Nolan Schaefer (2003–04)
SV%: .925 Seamus Kotyk (2003–04), Nolan Schaefer (2003–04)

=== Career ===
Career Goals: 84 Miroslav Zalesak
Career Assists: 117 Patrick Rissmiller
Career Points: 181 Patrick Rissmiller
Career Penalty Minutes: 948 Matt Carkner
Career Goaltending Wins: 34 Vesa Toskala
Career Shutouts: 7 Nolan Schaefer
Career Games: 315 Matt Carkner

=== American Hockey League Hall of Famers ===
AHL Hall of Fame Honored Members
Name	Seasons	Induction Year
Roy Sommer	2001-06 (head coach)	2024
