= Harry Oliver (ice hockey) =

Canadian ice hockey player (1898–1985)

- Hockey Hall of Fame, 1967
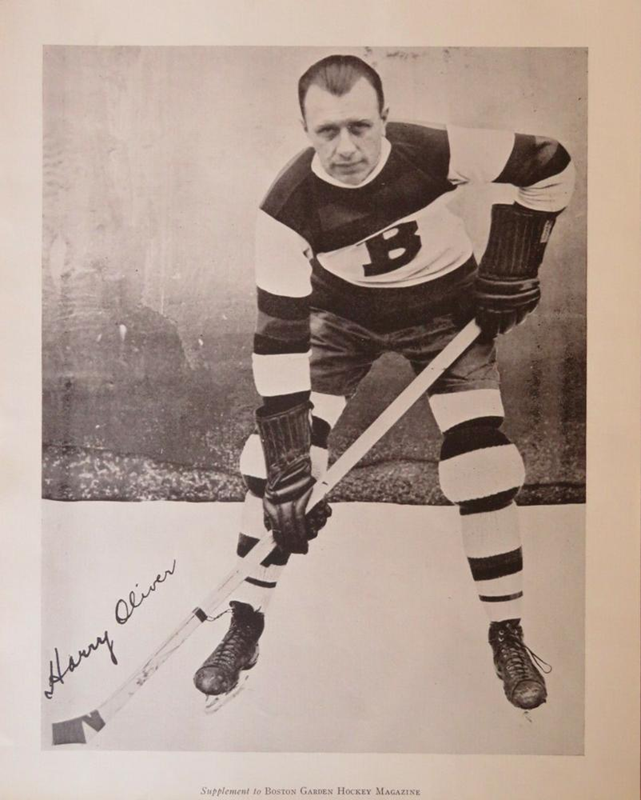
- 1933 photo of Oliver
- Born: October 26, 1898 Selkirk, Manitoba, Canada
- Died: June 16, 1985 (aged 86) Selkirk, Manitoba, Canada
- Height: 5 ft 8 in (173 cm)
- Weight: 155 lb (70 kg; 11 st 1 lb)
- Position: Right wing / Centre
- Shot: Right
- Played for: Calgary Tigers; Boston Bruins; New York Americans
- Playing career: 1918–1937

Harold "Pee-Wee" Oliver (October 26, 1898 – June 16, 1985) was a Canadian ice hockey forward who played for the Calgary Tigers of the Western Canada Hockey League (WCHL) and the Boston Bruins and New York Americans of the National Hockey League (NHL) between 1921 and 1937. He was a member of the Tigers' 1924 WCHL championship and won the Stanley Cup with the Bruins in 1929. Oliver played nearly 600 games in a professional career that spanned 16 seasons and scored 217 goals. He was inducted into the Hockey Hall of Fame in 1967.

== Playing career ==
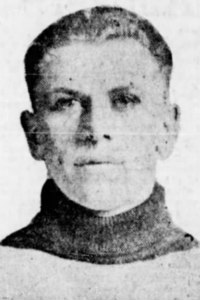
Oliver while with the Selkirk Fishermen

Oliver grew up in Selkirk, Manitoba. At an early age he taught himself how to skate on ponds near Selkirk. He once stated, “When I was a kid, there was no organized hockey. We just went out and played, sometimes on an outdoor rink, but mostly on the river.”

He then started playing organized hockey for both the junior and senior Selkirk Fishermen. Oliver and the Fishermen won the Manitoba Senior Hockey League in 1919 and challenged the Hamilton Tigers for the Allan Cup. Oliver scored a goal in the second game, but the Fishermen lost the two-game series on total goals, 7–6. He left Selkirk for a professional career in Calgary in 1920. He played one season with the Calgary Canadians of the independent Big-4 League in 1919–20 then moved to the Calgary Tigers and the new Western Canada Hockey League.

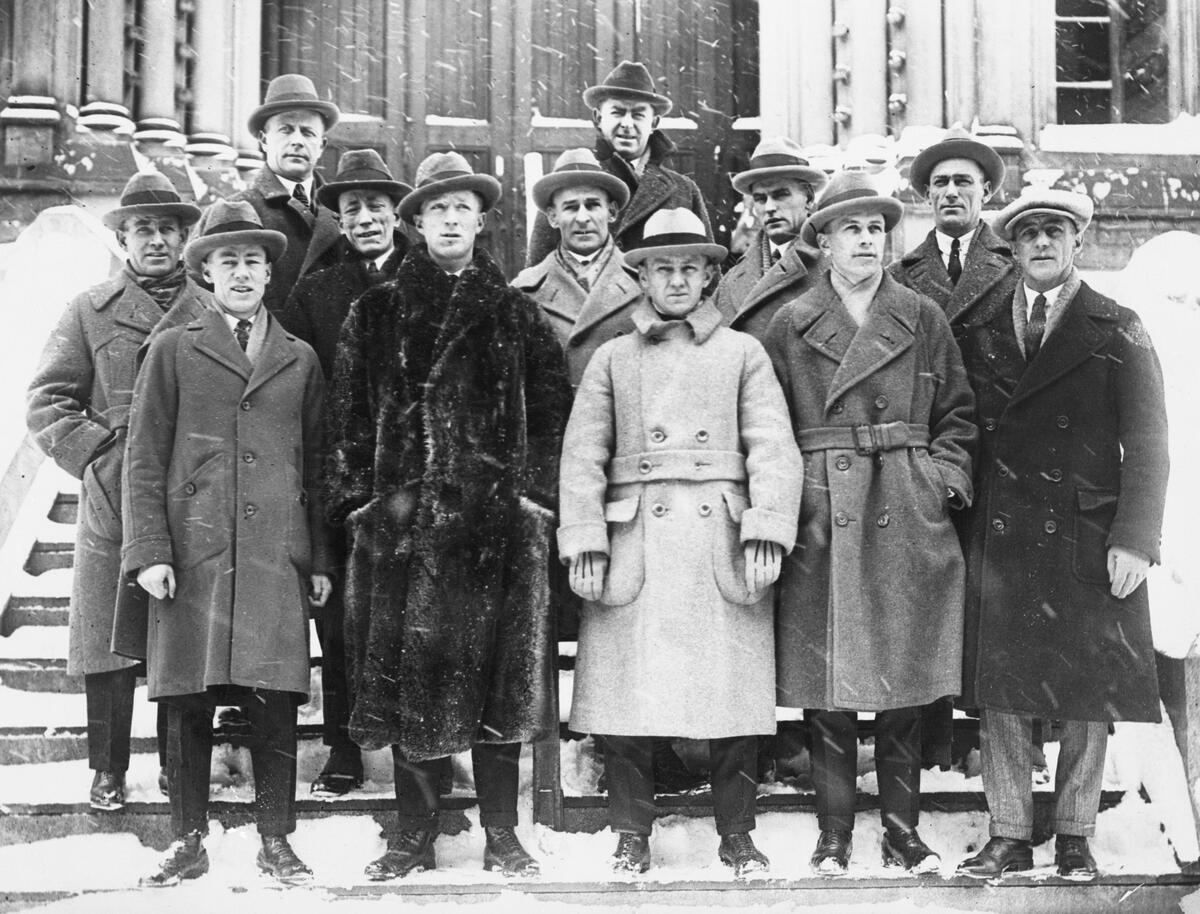
Oliver (second from right in the front row) with the Calgary Tigers in 1924.

Oliver quickly established himself as a star player in the WCHL, using his speed and shot to earn positions as a First-Team All-Star in both 1924 and 1925. He was a key member of the Tigers' team that won the 1923–24 WCHL championship, and lost to the Montreal Canadiens for the Stanley Cup.

Only being 5’8’’, 155 Oliver was known as “pee wee” throughout his career. However he got past his small size by using his speed, stick handling and shooting. During his time in the WHL he was compared to a thoroughbred horse, due to his speed and grace. Oliver never spent more than 24 minutes in the penalty box during a season.

When the WCHL collapsed in 1926, Oliver's rights were bought by the Boston Bruins. His NHL career began on a line with Bill Carson and Percy Galbraith, and he led the Bruins in scoring each of his first three seasons with the team. Oliver scored four goals in a game versus Chicago on January 11, 1927, becoming the first Boston Bruin to attain that feat. He led the Bruins in both goals and points scored for 3 straight years in 1926-27 1927-28 1928-29. He helped the team win the Stanley Cup in 1929 and remained with the organization for eight years. Oliver became the first Boston Bruin to score a playoff overtime goal when he notched the winner on March 20, 1930 versus the Montreal Maroons. He was also the first player to score 100 goals as a Bruin. He was remained as one of the Bruins top scorers until his final year with the team in 1933-34. The Bruins then sold his rights to the New York Americans in 1934, and Oliver completed his career with three seasons in New York.

On January 13, 1937, a newspaper in Montreal, reported that Oliver was resting in a hospital after an operation. Due to influenza, which resulted in him needing a mastoid operation to help him recover. This ultimately resulted in him retiring from hockey in 1937.

Post retirement

Well regarded for his gentlemanly nature on the ice, Oliver was inducted into the Hockey Hall of Fame in 1967, and is an honoured member of the Manitoba Hockey Hall of Fame.

Following his career, Oliver returned to Selkirk, starting his own business working first as an electrician, then moved to Winnipeg where he worked for the Weights and Measures Department of the Canadian Government. He died in 1985.

He is enshrined in the Selkirk historical museum in the people of Selkirk exhibit.

In 2023 he was named One of the Top 100 Best Bruins Players of all Time.

== Career statistics ==
=== Regular season and playoffs ===
			Regular season					Playoffs
Season	Team	League	GP	G	A	Pts	PIM	GP	G	A	Pts	PIM
1917–18	Selkirk Fishermen	WJrHL	—	—	—	—	—	2	7	4	11	0
1918–19	Selkirk Fishermen	MSHL	9	15	9	24	6	4	5	1	6	0
1918–19	Selkirk Fishermen	Al-Cup	—	—	—	—	—	2	7	4	11	0
1919–20	Selkirk Fishermen	MSHL	10	7	14	4	—	—	—	—	—
1920–21	Calgary Canadians	Big-4	16	14	6	20	11	—	—	—	—	—
1921–22	Calgary Tigers	WCHL	20	10	4	14	7	2	1	0	1	0
1922–23	Calgary Tigers	WCHL	29	25	7	32	10	—	—	—	—	—
1923–24	Calgary Tigers	WCHL	27	22	12	34	14	2	0	1	1	2
1923–24	Calgary Tigers	W-PO	—	—	—	—	—	3	2	1	3	2
1923–24	Calgary Tigers	St-Cup	—	—	—	—	—	2	0	0	0	0
1924–25	Calgary Tigers	WCHL	24	20	13	33	23	2	0	0	0	2
1925–26	Calgary Tigers	WHL	30	13	12	25	14	—	—	—	—	—
1926–27	Boston Bruins	NHL	42	18	6	24	17	8	4	2	6	4
1927–28	Boston Bruins	NHL	43	13	5	18	20	2	2	0	2	4
1928–29	Boston Bruins	NHL	43	17	6	23	24	5	1	1	2	8
1929–30	Boston Bruins	NHL	40	16	5	21	12	6	2	1	3	6
1930–31	Boston Bruins	NHL	44	16	14	30	18	4	0	0	0	2
1931–32	Boston Bruins	NHL	44	13	7	20	22	—	—	—	—	—
1932–33	Boston Bruins	NHL	47	11	7	18	10	5	0	0	0	0
1933–34	Boston Bruins	NHL	48	5	9	14	6	—	—	—	—	—
1934–35	New York Americans	NHL	47	7	9	16	4	—	—	—	—	—
1935–36	New York Americans	NHL	45	9	16	25	12	5	1	2	3	0
1936–37	New York Americans	NHL	20	2	1	3	2	—	—	—	—	—
WCHL totals			130	90	48	138	68	11	3	2	5	6
NHL totals			463	127	85	212	147	35	10	6	16	24

== Awards and achievements ==
- Stanley Cup Champion (1929)
- WCHL championship (1924)
- WCHL First-Team All-Star (1924, 1925)
- Inducted into the Hockey Hall of Fame in 1967
- Member of the Manitoba Hockey Hall of Fame
- Member of the Manitoba Sports Hall of Fame and Museum
- One of the Top 100 Best Boston Bruins Players of all Time.
