= 1921–22 WCHL season =

Professional ice hockey league season

The 1921–22 WCHL season was the first season for the Western Canada Hockey League. Four teams played 24 games each. The Regina Capitals defeated the regular-season champion Edmonton Eskimos in a two-game total-goals series to win the inaugural league championship.

== Teams ==
1921–22 Western Canada Hockey League
Team	City	Arena	Capacity
Calgary Tigers	Calgary, Alberta	Victoria Arena	N/A
Edmonton Eskimos	Edmonton, Alberta	Edmonton Stock Pavilion	2,000
Regina Capitals	Regina, Saskatchewan	Regina Stadium	N/A
Saskatoon Sheiks	Saskatoon, Saskatchewan	Crescent Arena	N/A

=== Map of teams ===
WCHL Teams

== Regular season ==
=== Final standings ===
Note GP = Games Played, W = Wins, L = Losses, T = Ties, GF = Goals For, GA = Goals Against, Pts = Points

Team	GP	W	L	T	GF	GA	Pts
Edmonton Eskimos	24	15	9	0	117	76	30
Regina Capitals	24	14	10	0	96	76	28
Calgary Tigers	24	14	10	0	75	62	28
Saskatoon Crescents^{1}	24	5	19	0	67	132	10

^{1} The Saskatoon Crescents relocated to Moose Jaw as the Moose Jaw Crescents on 3 February 1922.

== Playoffs ==
Edmonton and Regina ended the season with identical records of 14–9–1 with the sole tie being between the two teams. To decide first place, it was agreed to replay the tie game. Edmonton won the rematch 11–2 to place first.

The Capitals defeated the Calgary Tigers 2–1 (1–0, 1–1) in a two-game totals-goals series to determine second place. The Capitals then went on to beat first place Edmonton 3–2 (1–1, 2–1) in the league's first championship series.

Regina then advanced to play the Pacific Coast Hockey Association champion Vancouver Millionaires in the Stanley Cup playoffs for the right to play in the 1922 Stanley Cup Finals. The Capitals won the first game but lost the two-game total goals series 2–5 (2–1, 0–4). Vancouver advanced to the Stanley Cup Finals against the Toronto St. Patricks of the National Hockey League, with Toronto winning the Stanley Cup, three games to two.

=== Scoring leaders ===
Player	Team	GP	G	A	Pts	PIM
Duke Keats	Edmonton Eskimos	25	31	24	55	47
Ty Arbour	Edmonton Eskimos	23	26	7	33	22
Bullet Joe Simpson	Edmonton Eskimos	25	21	12	33	15
George Hay	Regina Capitals	25	21	11	32	9
Barney Stanley	Calgary Tigers	24	26	5	31	17
Dick Irvin	Regina Capitals	20	21	7	28	17
Art Gagné	Edmonton Eskimos	20	15	7	22	24
Rabbit McVeigh	Regina Capitals	19	15	6	21	8
Red Dutton	Calgary Tigers	22	16	5	21	73
Harry Oliver	Regina Capitals	20	10	4	14	7

== See also ==
- List of Stanley Cup champions
- 1921–22 NHL season
- 1921–22 PCHA season
- 1921 in sports
- 1922 in sports

Preceded by none	WCHL seasons	Succeeded by 1922–23 WCHL season

== Bibliography ==
- Lowe, Kevin; Fischler, Stan; Fischler, Shirley (1988), Champions: The Making Of The Edmonton Oilers, Scarborough, Ontario: Prentice-Hall, ISBN 0-132-35623-6
