= Duke Keats =

Canadian ice hockey player (1895–1972)

- Hockey Hall of Fame, 1958
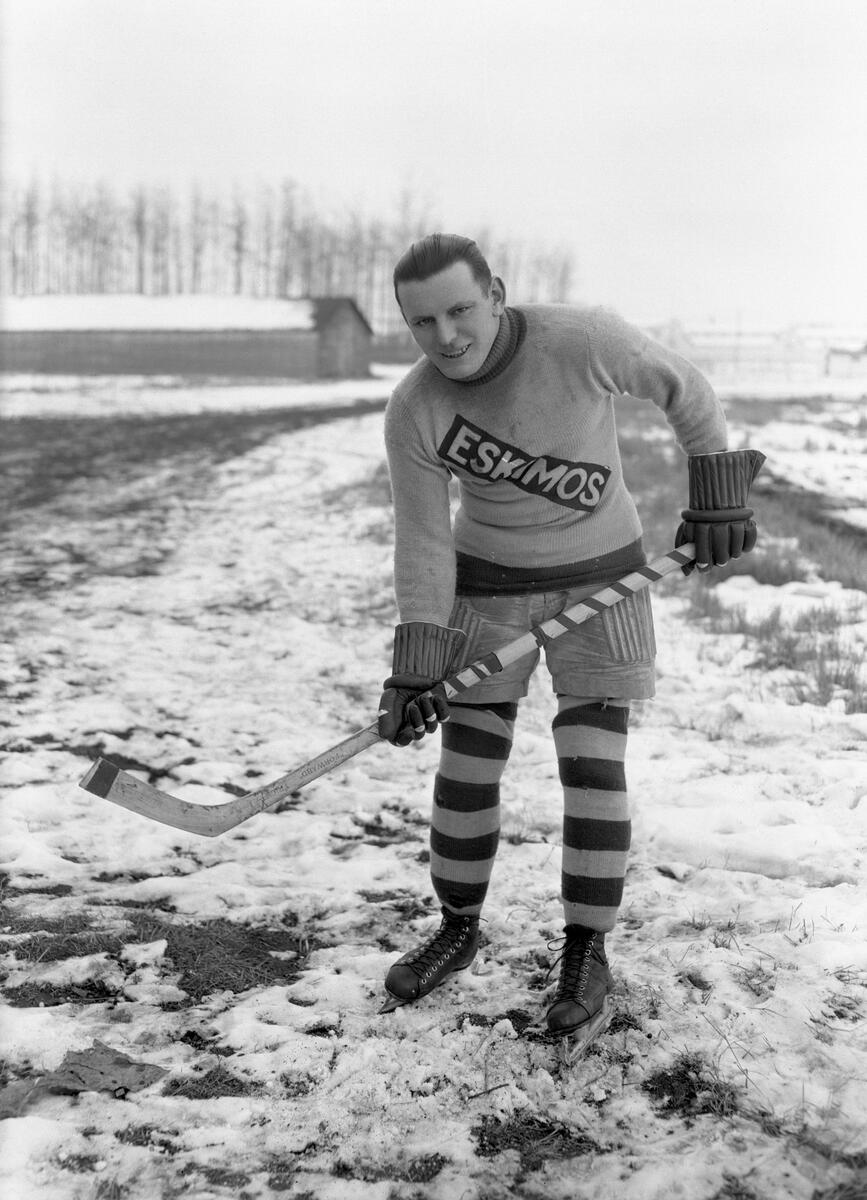
- Keats with the Edmonton Eskimos in the 1921–22 season.
- Born: March 1, 1895 Montreal, Quebec, Canada
- Died: January 16, 1972 (aged 76) Victoria, British Columbia, Canada
- Height: 5 ft 11 in (180 cm)
- Weight: 195 lb (88 kg; 13 st 13 lb)
- Position: Centre
- Shot: Right
- Played for: Toronto Blueshirts; Edmonton Eskimos; Boston Bruins; Detroit Cougars; Chicago Black Hawks
- Playing career: 1915–1934

Gordon Blanchard "Iron Duke" Keats (March 1, 1895 – January 16, 1972) was a Canadian professional ice hockey centre who played for the Toronto Blueshirts of the National Hockey Association (NHA), Edmonton Eskimos of the Western Canada Hockey League (WCHL) and the Boston Bruins, Detroit Cougars and Chicago Black Hawks of the National Hockey League (NHL) between 1915 and 1929. He was most famous for his time in the WCHL where he was named a First-Team All-Star by the league in each of its five seasons of existence. He won the league championship and appeared in the 1923 Stanley Cup Final with the Eskimos.

Duke Keats was inducted into the Hockey Hall of Fame in 1958.

== Playing career ==
Keats was born in Montreal, Quebec, and at a young age moved with his family to North Bay, Ontario, where he was given his nickname of "Duke" at the age of six. He joined the Cobalt Mining League at the age of 14, and three years later was being paid $75 a week to star in the league. He joined the NHA's Toronto Blueshirts in 1915 and finished fifth in league scoring that year. After playing part of a second season with Toronto in 1916–17, he enlisted in June 1916 in the Canadian military as a member of the 228th Battalion as part of the First World War. The 228th had played in the NHA during 1916–17, but as Keats was still a member of the Blueshirts his superiors saw that he was unavailable for any games. He left for the United Kingdom on February 19, 1917. Overseas the 228th was reconstituted into the 6th Battalion, Canadian Railway Troops. On January 10, 1918, Keats was sentenced to 14 days' field punishment for drunkenness, but otherwise had no noteworthy events during his time in the war, and by March 1919 he was back in Canada.

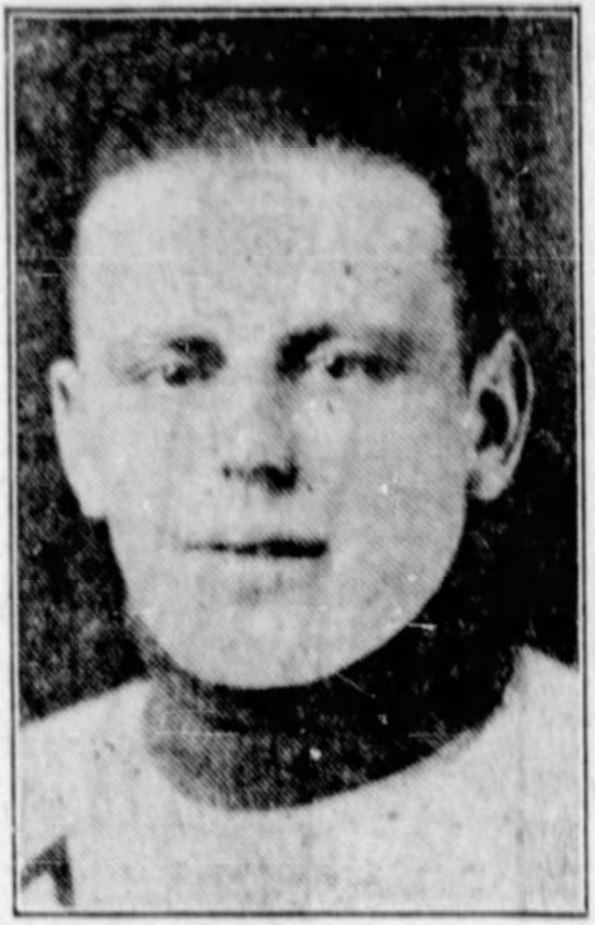
Keats with the Edmonton Eskimos.

Keats settled in Edmonton, Alberta after the war and joined the Edmonton Eskimos of the Big-4 League in 1919, leading the league in scoring in both 1919–20 and 1920–21. Officially an amateur league, there were rumours that Keats and several other players were secretly being paid a professional salary to play in the Big-4. The team officially turned professional when it helped form the WCHL in 1921 with Keats as the league's greatest star. He played for the Eskimos in all five seasons of the league's existence and was named a First-Team All-Star at centre in each. One of the most gifted offensive players of his time, legend has it that he once collected a puck in his own zone and scored a goal after skating the length of the ice surface backwards.

Keats led the Eskimos in scoring in 1921–22, recording 31 goals and 24 assists in 25 games, to lead the Eskimos to the top record in the league and the WCHL final where they lost to the Regina Capitals. The Eskimos again finished with the league's top record in 1922–23, and again faced the Regina Capitals in the final. The Eskimos avenged the previous season as Keats scored the championship winning goal in overtime of the second game. Keats and the Eskimos went on to lose the 1923 Stanley Cup Finals to the Ottawa Senators.

Facing financial ruin, the Eskimos sold the rights to Keats and six other players to the Boston Bruins for $50,000 in 1926. He played half of the 1926–27 NHL season in Boston before he was traded to the Detroit Cougars, along with Archie Briden, in exchange for Frank Fredrickson and Harry Meeking. Keats began the following season in Detroit but was suspended early in the season after swinging his stick at a spectator in Chicago who was heckling him. He missed three weeks of play as a result. The day after his reinstatement, the Cougars sent him to the Chicago Black Hawks for Gord Fraser and $5,000 cash.

After three games with Chicago in 1928–29, he left the team and helped organize the Tulsa Oilers of the American Hockey Association (AHA), and was the league's top scorer that season. He played parts of two more seasons in Tulsa before taking a season off in 1931–32. Keats returned to Edmonton in 1932 as a player, coach and owner of a reformed Eskimos team. He played two seasons before retiring as a player. Keats went on to coach several teams in the Canadian prairies and briefly worked for the Black Hawks before settling in Victoria, British Columbia, in 1947, where he worked for the government and served as president of the Victoria Commercial Hockey League. He died on January 16, 1972, and is buried in Royal Oak Burial Park in Victoria.

Keats was inducted into the Hockey Hall of Fame in 1958, and into the Edmonton Sports Hall of Fame in 1964.

== Playing style ==
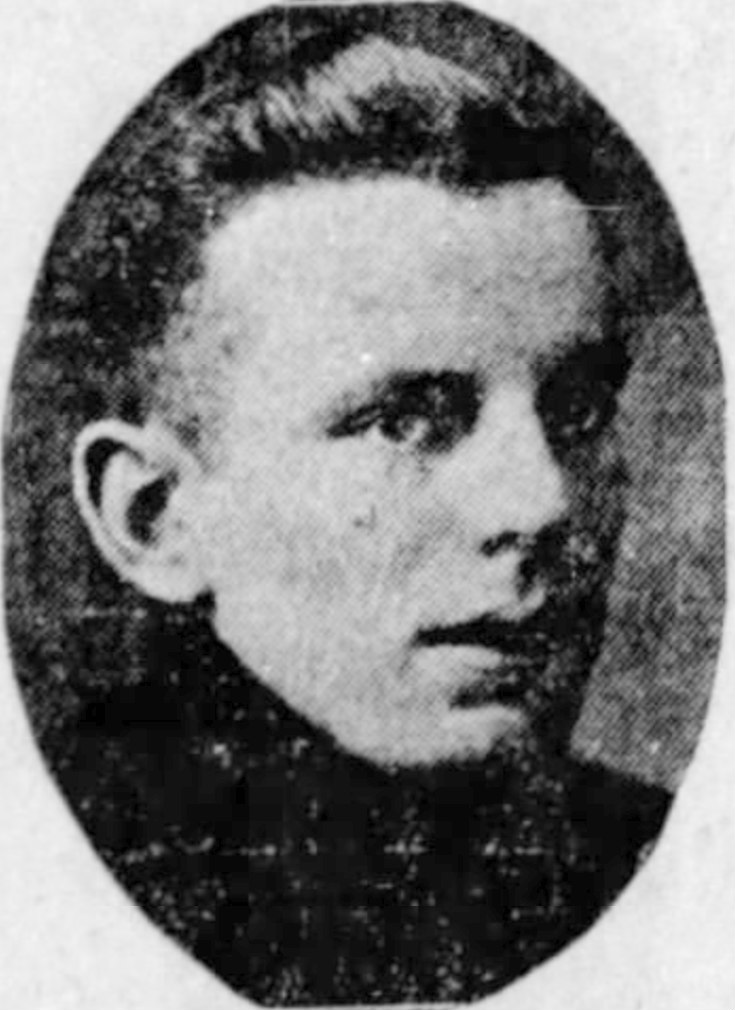
Duke Keats.

"Keats was a slow skater, but he was a wonderful stickhandler and so big and powerful that you couldn't get at the puck. He'd hold it until his wings were in position and then put it right on the stick of one of them."

— Dick Irvin on Duke Keats' playing style.

Duke Keats, whilst first making his way into the hockey circuit in the Cobalt Mines Hockey League in Northeastern Ontario in the early to mid 1910s, started out his playing career as a defenceman, but he would later switch to forward where he would find himself on the centre ice position.

Montreal Canadiens head coach and former player Dick Irvin, in a 1952 Dink Carroll column in the Montreal Gazette, claimed that Keats was the best playmaker he had ever seen, besting out Boston Bruins centre forward Bill Cowley. Irvin, who had played against Keats in the WCHL in the early 1920s, claimed that Keats was slow on his skates but that he was so strong at holding onto the puck, and such a great stickhandler, that he could wait out until his wingers were in the right position to receive his passes, and then put it right on one of their stick blades.

Outside of his puck-handling skills Keats was also known to have a temper on the ice, which sometimes left him in trouble with league authorities. In a game between Detroit Cougars and Chicago Black Hawks in November 1927, Keats swung his stick against a heckling spectator and almost struck famous ballroom dancer Irene Castle, then wife of Chicago Black Hawks owner Major Frederic McLaughlin. He was suspended following the incident and missed three weeks of play as a result. When Keats was reinstated Frederic McLaughlin traded for him to have him on his Black Hawks team.

== Career statistics ==
=== Regular season and playoffs ===
			Regular season					Playoffs
Season	Team	League	GP	G	A	Pts	PIM	GP	G	A	Pts	PIM
1912–13	Cobalt Mines	CoMHL	6	6	0	6	18	—	—	—	—	—
1913–14	Cobalt Mines	CoMHL	8	8	0	8	8	—	—	—	—	—
1913–14	North Bay Trappers	NOHA	3	2	0	2	18	4	6	0	6	—
1914–15	Haileybury Hawks	TBSHL	—	—	—	—	—	—	—	—	—	—
1915–16	Toronto Blueshirts	NHA	24	22	7	29	112	—	—	—	—	—
1916–17	Toronto Blueshirts	NHA	13	15	3	18	54	—	—	—	—	—
1919–20	Edmonton Eskimos	Big-4	12	18	14	32	41	2	2	2	4	2
1920–21	Edmonton Eskimos	Big-4	15	23	6	29	36	—	—	—	—	—
1921–22	Edmonton Eskimos	WCHL	25	31	24	55	47	2	0	1	1	6
1922–23	Edmonton Eskimos	WCHL	25	24	13	37	72	2	2	2	4	0
1922–23	Edmonton Eskimos	St-Cup	–	–	–	–	–	2	0	0	0	4
1923–24	Edmonton Eskimos	WCHL	29	19	12	31	41	—	—	—	—	—
1924–25	Edmonton Eskimos	WCHL	28	23	9	32	63	—	—	—	—	—
1925–26	Edmonton Eskimos	WHL	30	20	9	29	134	2	0	0	0	28
1926–27	Boston Bruins	NHL	17	4	7	11	20	—	—	—	—	—
1926–27	Detroit Cougars	NHL	25	12	1	13	32	—	—	—	—	—
1927–28	Detroit Cougars	NHL	5	0	2	2	6	—	—	—	—	—
1927–28	Chicago Black Hawks	NHL	32	14	8	22	55	—	—	—	—	—
1928–29	Chicago Black Hawks	NHL	3	0	1	1	0	—	—	—	—	—
1928–29	Tulsa Oilers	AHA	39	22	11	33	18	4	0	1	1	10
1929–30	Tulsa Oilers	AHA	3	2	2	4	2	—	—	—	—	—
1930–31	Tulsa Oilers	AHA	43	14	10	24	44	4	0	1	1	6
1932–33	Edmonton Eskimos	WCHL	25	8	7	15	146	8	1	4	5	0
1933–34	Edmonton Eskimos	NWHL	25	8	6	14	8	2	0	0	0	2
NHA totals			37	37	10	47	166	—	—	—	—	—
WCHL/WHL totals			137	117	67	184	357	6	2	3	5	34
NHL totals			82	30	19	49	113	—	—	—	—	—

== NHL coaching record ==
Team	Year	Regular season						Postseason
Team	Year	G	W	L	T	Pts	Division rank	Result
Detroit Cougars	1926–27	11	2	7	2	28	5th in American	Missed playoffs

Preceded by Art Duncan	Head coach of the Detroit Cougars; 1926–27	Succeeded by Jack Adams
