= 1924–25 WCHL season =

Professional ice hockey league season

The 1924–25 WCHL season was the fourth season for the Western Canada Hockey League. With the collapse of the Pacific Coast Hockey Association (PCHA), two teams, the Vancouver Maroons and Victoria Cougars joined the WCHL. Six teams played 28 games each.

== Teams ==
1924–25 Western Canada Hockey League
| Team | City | Arena | Capacity |
| Calgary Tigers | Calgary, Alberta | Victoria Arena | N/A |
| Edmonton Eskimos | Edmonton, Alberta | Edmonton Stock Pavilion | 2,000 |
| Regina Capitals | Regina, Saskatchewan | Regina Stadium | N/A |
| Saskatoon Crescents | Saskatoon, Saskatchewan | Crescent Arena | N/A |
| Vancouver Maroons | Vancouver, British Columbia | Denman Arena | 10,500 |
| Victoria Cougars | Victoria, British Columbia | Patrick Arena | 4,000 |

=== Map of teams ===
WCHL Teams

== Regular season ==
=== Final standings ===
Note GP = Games Played, W = Wins, L = Losses, T = Ties, GF = Goals For, GA = Goals Against, Pts = Points

| Team | GP | W | L | T | GF | GA | Pts |
|---|---|---|---|---|---|---|---|
| Calgary Tigers | 28 | 17 | 11 | 0 | 96 | 80 | 34 |
| Saskatoon Crescents | 28 | 16 | 11 | 1 | 103 | 75 | 33 |
| Victoria Cougars | 28 | 16 | 12 | 0 | 84 | 63 | 32 |
| Edmonton Eskimos | 28 | 14 | 13 | 1 | 97 | 109 | 29 |
| Vancouver Maroons | 28 | 12 | 16 | 0 | 91 | 103 | 24 |
| Regina Capitals | 28 | 8 | 20 | 0 | 82 | 123 | 16 |

== Playoffs ==
=== League championship ===
Bracket

Semi-final
Saskatoon Crescents | 1 | 3 | 4
Victoria Cougars | 3 | 3 | 6

Final
Calgary Tigers | 1 | 0 | 1
Victoria Cougars | 1 | 2 | 3

Semi-final

The Victoria Cougars defeated the Saskatoon Crescents in the WCHL semi-final.

| Date | Away | Score | Home | Score |
|---|---|---|---|---|
| March 6 | Saskatoon | 1 | Victoria | 3 |
| March 10 | Victoria | 3 | Saskatoon | 3 |
Victoria wins two-game, total-goals series 6–4

Source: Coleman(1966)

Final

The Victoria Cougars then defeated the Calgary Tigers in the WCHL final.

| Date | Away | Score | Home | Score |
|---|---|---|---|---|
| March 14 | Victoria | 1 | Calgary | 1 |
| March 18 | Calgary | 0 | Victoria | 2 |
Victoria wins two-game, total-goals series 3–1

Source: Coleman(1966)

=== Stanley Cup Finals ===
The Victoria Cougars faced the National Hockey League champion Montreal Canadiens in a best-of-5 series for the Stanley Cup. Victoria defeated Montreal, 3 games to 1, marking the only time since the inception of the NHL in 1917 that the NHL champion did not win the Cup and the final time this would happen.

| Date | Away | Score | Home | Score |
|---|---|---|---|---|
| March 21 | Montreal Canadiens | 2 | Victoria Cougars | 5 |
| March 23 | Montreal Canadiens | 1 | Victoria Cougars | 3 |
| March 27 | Montreal Canadiens | 4 | Victoria Cougars | 2 |
| March 30 | Montreal Canadiens | 1 | Victoria Cougars | 6 |

Source: Coleman(1966)

== Player statistics ==
=== Scoring leaders ===
| Player | Team | GP | G | A | Pts | PIM |
|---|---|---|---|---|---|---|
| Mickey MacKay | Vancouver Maroons | 28 | 27 | 6 | 33 | 17 |
| Harry Oliver | Calgary Tigers | 24 | 20 | 13 | 33 | 23 |
| Duke Keats | Edmonton Eskimos | 28 | 23 | 9 | 32 | 63 |
| Bill Cook | Saskatoon Crescents | 27 | 22 | 10 | 32 | 79 |
| Frank Fredrickson | Victoria Cougars | 28 | 22 | 8 | 30 | 43 |
| Frank Boucher | Vancouver Maroons | 27 | 16 | 12 | 28 | 6 |
| Archie Briden | Edmonton Eskimos | 28 | 17 | 6 | 23 | 33 |
| Bullet Joe Simpson | Edmonton Eskimos | 28 | 11 | 12 | 23 | 16 |
| George Hay | Regina Capitals | 20 | 16 | 6 | 22 | 6 |
| Bun Cook | Saskatoon Crescents | 28 | 18 | 3 | 21 | 48 |

=== Goaltending averages ===
| Name | Club | GP | GA | SO | Avg. |
|---|---|---|---|---|---|
| Hap Holmes | Victoria | 28 | 63 | 3 | 2.3 |
| George Hainsworth | Saskatoon | 28 | 75 | 2 | 2.7 |
| Hugh Lehman | Vancouver | 11 | 30 | | 2.7 |
| Hal Winkler | Calgary | 28 | 80 | 2 | 2.9 |
| Hec Fowler | Edmonton | 8 | 29 | 1 | 3.6 |
| Bill Tobin | Edmonton | 3 | 12 | | 4.0 |
| Herb Stuart | Edmonton | 17 | 68 | 1 | 4.0 |
| Charlie Reid | Vancouver | 17 | 72 | 1 | 4.4 |
| Red McCusker | Regina | 28 | 123 | | 4.4 |

Source: Coleman(1966)

== See also ==
- 1924–25 NHL season

| Preceded by 1923–24 WCHL season | WCHL seasons 1924–25 | Succeeded by 1925–26 WHL season |
