= 1923–24 WCHL season =

Professional ice hockey league season

The 1923–24 WCHL season was the third season for the Western Canada Hockey League (WCHL). Four teams played 30 games each. The Calgary Tigers defeated the Regina Capitals to win the WCHL title. Calgary moved on to the Stanley Cup playoffs, losing in the Finals to the Montreal Canadiens.

== League business ==
The league approved a rule limiting goaltender pads to 12 inches (30 cm) in width.

== Teams ==
1923–24 Western Canada Hockey League
Team	City	Arena	Capacity
Calgary Tigers	Calgary, Alberta	Victoria Arena	N/A
Edmonton Eskimos	Edmonton, Alberta	Edmonton Stock Pavilion	2,000
Regina Capitals	Regina, Saskatchewan	Regina Stadium	N/A
Saskatoon Crescents	Saskatoon, Saskatchewan	Crescent Arena	N/A

=== Map of teams ===
WCHL Teams

== Regular season ==
The four teams played an interlocking schedule with the Pacific Coast Hockey Association (PCHA) teams.

=== Final standings ===
Note GP = Games Played, W = Wins, L = Losses, T = Ties, GF = Goals For, GA = Goals Against, Pts = Points

Team	GP	W	L	T	GF	GA	Pts
Calgary Tigers	30	18	11	1	83	72	37
Regina Capitals	30	17	11	2	83	67	36
Saskatoon Crescents	30	15	12	3	91	73	33
Edmonton Eskimos	30	11	15	4	69	81	26

=== Scoring leaders ===
Player	Team	GP	G	A	Pts	PIM
Bill Cook	Saskatoon Crescents	30	26	14	40	20
Harry Oliver	Calgary Tigers	27	22	12	34	14
George Hay	Regina Capitals	25	20	11	31	8
Duke Keats	Edmonton Eskimos	29	19	12	31	41
Barney Stanley	Regina Capitals	30	15	11	26	27
Laurie Scott	Saskatoon Crescents	30	20	5	25	8
Bernie Morris	Calgary Tigers	30	16	7	23	13
Cully Wilson	Calgary Tigers	30	16	7	23	37
Dick Irvin	Regina Capitals	29	15	8	23	33
Newsy Lalonde	Saskatoon Crescents	21	10	10	20	24

== Playoffs ==
The Calgary Tigers played off against Regina for the WCHL title.

Date	Away	Score	Home	Score	Notes
March 5	Calgary	2	Regina	2	
March 7	Regina	0	Calgary	2	

Calgary wins two-game total-goals series 4–2.

The Tigers then played off against Pacific Coast Hockey Association (PCHA) champion Vancouver to advance to the Stanley Cup Finals.

Date	Away	Score	Home	Score	Notes
March 10	Calgary	1	Vancouver	3	
March 12	Vancouver	3	Calgary	6	
March 15	Calgary	3	Vancouver	1	in Winnipeg

Calgary wins best-of-three series 2–1.

=== Stanley Cup Finals ===
In the final, the Calgary Tigers would face the National Hockey League (NHL) champion Montreal Canadiens. Montreal had also defeated Vancouver to advance to the Finals. Montreal then defeated Calgary two games to none in the best-of-three series to win the Stanley Cup.

Date	Away	Score	Home	Score	Notes
March 22	Calgary Tigers	1	Montreal Canadiens	6	(NHL rules)
March 25	Calgary Tigers	0	Montreal Canadiens	3	in Ottawa (WCHL rules)

== See also ==
- 1923–24 NHL season
- 1923–24 PCHA season
- List of pre-NHL seasons

== Bibliography ==
- Coleman, Charles L. (1966), The Trail of the Stanley Cup, Vol. 1, 1893–1926 inc.

Preceded by 1922–23 WCHL season	WCHL seasons 1923–24	Succeeded by 1924–25 WCHL season
