= Revival (sports team) =

Term in sports

In sports, a revival is a new club or franchise is using a name or colours of a previously active team. The previously active team may be defunct, temporarily suspended or may have transferred its operations to another city. The new team may be a new team or franchise, or it may be a transferred team taking over a previous team's colours and/or name. Sports teams names or nicknames are copyrighted in North America and elsewhere. Therefore, permission often must be granted from the owner or family of the defunct team.

== Description ==
Sports teams are organized in various ways and the term is used differently in different situations. A team can be simply not fielded for a season, but the parent organization still exists. A team and franchise can relocate to another city, and adopt a new nickname. At some point, sometimes decades later, a new team, with a new organization, then revives the team, name or colours in the original city. It may or may not be granted possession of the original team's history (team records, championships and the like)

=== Simple suspension ===
A team can be members of a sports association that fields several teams. A team at one level may be discontinued, then 'revived' in another year, such as the Central Plains Junior hockey team in 2012, after the team did not field a team in the AAA midget bracket the previous season.

=== Revival in name only ===
In professional sports in North America, there are several examples whereby a team relocated, taking its franchise and franchise history with it to the new city. The teams were renamed and used a new nickname. The revived teams were not granted possession of the old team's history.

Major League Baseball

The Milwaukee Brewers are named after an earlier club, which relocated to St. Louis, Missouri and eventually became the Baltimore Orioles, and a minor-league club named the Brewers. The Baltimore Orioles are named after an earlier club, which relocated to New York, New York and became the New York Yankees. The Washington Nationals are named after an earlier club, which relocated to Minneapolis, Minnesota and became the Minnesota Twins.

National Hockey League (NHL)

The Ottawa Senators ice hockey team is named after an earlier Senators ice hockey team. Founded in 1883, the team was a member of the National Hockey League (NHL) from 1917 to 1934. After the 1933–34 season, the NHL franchise relocated to St. Louis, Missouri. The Ottawa Senators continued as a senior amateur, and later a professional, team until 1954. The founders of the current franchise received permission from the descendants of Tommy Gorman, who owned the Senators in 1954, to use the name. The new Senators also adopted the colours of the original franchise.

In 2011, the Atlanta Thrashers were sold and relocated to Winnipeg, Manitoba, where the team was renamed the Winnipeg Jets. The 'original' Winnipeg Jets team existed from 1972 to 1996 until it moved to Phoenix in 1996 to become the Phoenix Coyotes. The Jets' team name and trademarks had reverted to the possession of the NHL after the move, although the franchise history (retired jerseys, team statistics) is continued by the Coyotes. While the new team revived the Jets name, new jerseys and team colours were developed.

=== Franchise history reversions ===
In two cases, a newly granted franchise has revived a team that was inactive, and has been granted the rights to the previous team's history:

The Cleveland Browns were a professional football team from 1946 until owner Art Modell moved the club to Baltimore in 1995. However, in a deal with the NFL and the City of Cleveland, the team was declared inactive for three years until a new expansion club, under the old name and colors, was established in 1999. The new Browns are considered a continuation of the old franchise.

The Montreal Alouettes are named after an earlier franchise which became defunct in 1981. The Baltimore Stallions, which were formed through expansion, relocated to Montreal after playing in Baltimore from 1994 until 1996. The CFL considers all clubs that have played in Montreal since 1946 as one franchise in their league records, including those of the original Alouettes (1946–1981), Montreal Concordes (1982–1985) and Montreal Alouettes (1986). The Alouettes and the CFL, however, do not recognize the Baltimore franchise, or its records, as part of the official team history.

== See also ==
- Phoenix club (sports)
