= 1925–26 WHL season =

Professional ice hockey league season

The 1925–26 WHL season was the fifth and last season for the now defunct Western Canada Hockey League (WCHL), which was renamed Western Hockey League (WHL) at the start of the season due to one of its Canadian teams, the Regina Capitals, moving to Portland, Oregon in the United States and being renamed the Portland Rosebuds. Six teams played 30 games each. At season's end, some of the teams reorganised to create a semi-pro league called the Prairie Hockey League that lasted for two seasons. The WHL was the last league other than the National Hockey League to contest for the Stanley Cup.

== Off-season ==
Regina's team folded, and a Portland club was formed and the Regina players transferred to it. There was discussions of moving the Edmonton team to Regina but it stayed in Edmonton. The new New York Americans bought Joe Simpson, John Morrison and Roy Rickey from Edmonton, but Edmonton would have enough talent left to win the WHL title.

== Teams ==
1925–26 Western Hockey League
Team	City	Arena	Capacity
Calgary Tigers	Calgary, Alberta	Victoria Arena	N/A
Edmonton Eskimos	Edmonton, Alberta	Edmonton Stock Pavilion	2,000
Portland Rosebuds	Portland, Oregon	Portland Ice Arena	2,000
Saskatoon Sheiks	Saskatoon, Saskatchewan	Crescent Arena	N/A
Vancouver Maroons	Vancouver, British Columbia	Denman Arena	10,500
Victoria Cougars	Victoria, British Columbia	Patrick Arena	4,000

=== Map of teams ===
WHL Teams

== Regular season ==
=== Final standing ===
Note GP = Games Played, W = Wins, L = Losses, T = Ties, GF = Goals For, GA = Goals Against, Pts = Points

Team	GP	W	L	T	GF	GA	Pts
Edmonton Eskimos	30	19	11	0	94	77	38
Saskatoon Sheiks	30	18	11	1	93	64	37
Victoria Cougars	30	15	11	4	68	53	34
Portland Rosebuds	30	12	16	2	84	110	26
Calgary Tigers	30	10	17	3	71	80	23
Vancouver Maroons	30	10	18	2	64	90	22

== Playoffs ==
As in the previous season, the third place Victoria Cougars won the playoff championship. In the semi-final, the Cougars met the Saskatoon Sheiks.

Date	Away	Score	Home	Score	Notes
March 12	Victoria	3	Saskatoon	3	
March 16	Saskatoon	0	Victoria	1	8'10" overtime

Victoria wins two-game, total-goals series 4–3.

In the final, the Cougars faced off against the Edmonton Eskimos. As there was no ice available in Edmonton, Edmonton's 'home' game was played in Vancouver.

Date	Away	Score	Home	Score	Notes
March 20	Edmonton	1	Victoria	3	
March 22	Victoria	2	Edmonton	2	

Victoria wins two-game, total-goals series 5–3.

=== Stanley Cup Finals ===
The Cougars faced the National Hockey League champion Montreal Maroons in a best-of-five series, losing three games to one. After the WHL folded at the end of this season, the Stanley Cup would no longer be contested as a challenge tournament between league champions, but would be automatically awarded to the NHL champion, a custom formalized in 1947.

Date	Away	Score	Home	Score	Notes
March 30	Victoria Cougars	0	Montreal Maroons	3	
April 1	Victoria Cougars	0	Montreal Maroons	3	
April 3	Victoria Cougars	3	Montreal Maroons	2	
April 6	Victoria Cougars	0	Montreal Maroons	2	

== Player statistics ==
=== Scoring leaders ===
Player	Team	GP	G	A	Pts	PIM
Bill Cook	Saskatoon Sheiks	30	31	13	44	26
Dick Irvin	Portland Rosebuds	30	31	5	36	29
Corb Denneny	Saskatoon Sheiks	30	18	16	34	12
Art Gagne	Edmonton Eskimos	30	21	12	33	20
George Hay	Portland Rosebuds	30	19	12	31	4
Duke Keats	Edmonton Eskimos	30	20	9	29	134
Harry Oliver	Calgary Tigers	30	13	12	25	14
Frank Fredrickson	Victoria Cougars	30	18	8	24	89
Frank Boucher	Vancouver Maroons	29	15	7	22	14
Barney Stanley	Edmonton Eskimos	29	14	8	22	47

=== Goaltending averages ===
Name	Club	GP	GA	SO	Avg.
Hap Holmes	Victoria	30	53	4	1.8
George Hainsworth	Saskatoon	30	64	4	2.1
Herbert Stuart	Edmonton	30	77	2	2.6
Hal Winkler	Calgary	30	80	6	2.7
Hugh Lehman	Vancouver	30	90	3	3.0
Red McCusker	Regina	30	110		3.7

== See also ==
- List of Stanley Cup champions
- List of pre-NHL seasons
- 1925–26 NHL season
- 1925 in sports
- 1926 in sports

Preceded by 1924–25 WCHL season	WHL seasons	Succeeded by 1926–27 PHL season
