= 1922–23 WCHL season =

Professional ice hockey league season

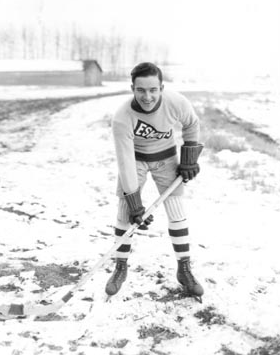

The 1922–23 WCHL season was the second season for the Western Canada Hockey League. Four teams played 30 games each.

== Teams ==
1922–23 Western Canada Hockey League
Team	City	Arena	Capacity
Calgary Tigers	Calgary, Alberta	Victoria Arena	N/A
Edmonton Eskimos	Edmonton, Alberta	Edmonton Stock Pavilion	2,000
Regina Capitals	Regina, Saskatchewan	Regina Stadium	N/A
Saskatoon Crescents	Saskatoon, Saskatchewan	Crescent Arena	N/A

=== Map of teams ===
WCHL Teams

== Regular season ==
=== Final standings ===
Note GP = Games Played, W = Wins, L = Losses, T = Ties, GF = Goals For, GA = Goals Against, Pts = Points

Team	GP	W	L	T	GF	GA	Pts
Edmonton Eskimos	30	19	10	1	112	90	39
Regina Capitals	30	16	14	0	93	97	32
Calgary Tigers	30	12	18	0	91	106	24
Saskatoon Crescents	30	8	20	2	91	125	18

=== Scoring leaders ===
Player	Team	GP	G	A	Pts	PIM
Art Gagné	Edmonton Eskimos	29	22	21	43	63
Duke Keats	Edmonton Eskimos	25	24	13	37	72
George Hay	Regina Capitals	30	28	8	36	12
Newsy Lalonde	Saskatoon Crescents	29	30	4	34	44
Harry Oliver	Calgary Tigers	29	25	7	32	10
Bullet Joe Simpson	Edmonton Eskimos	30	15	14	29	6
Ty Arbour	Edmonton Eskimos	30	18	9	27	10
Bill Cook	Saskatoon Crescents	30	9	16	25	19
Jimmy Gibson	Calgary Tigers	29	19	5	24	6
Amby Moran	Regina Capitals	28	15	8	23	37

== Stanley Cup Finals ==
The Edmonton Eskimos won the WCHL championship and advanced directly to the Stanley Cup Final, where they would face the National Hockey League champion Ottawa Senators. Ottawa had previously defeated the Pacific Coast Hockey Association champions, the Vancouver Maroons. Ottawa then defeated Edmonton two games to none in the best-of-three series to win the Stanley Cup.

Date	Away	Score	Home	Score	Notes
March 29	Ottawa Senators	2	Edmonton Eskimos	1	(OT)
March 31	Ottawa Senators	1	Edmonton Eskimos	0	

== See also ==
- List of Stanley Cup champions
- Pacific Coast Hockey Association
- List of NHL seasons
- 1922 in sports
- 1923 in sports

Preceded by 1921–22 WCHL season	WCHL seasons	Succeeded by 1923–24 WCHL season
