= Edmonton Eskimos (ice hockey) =

- City: Edmonton, Alberta, Canada
- League: ECHL (1911–1915); Big-4 League (1919–1921); WCHL (1921–1926); PrHL (1926–27)
- Founded: 1911
- Operated: 1911–1927
- Colors: Orange & Black (1919–20) Green & White (1921–1926)

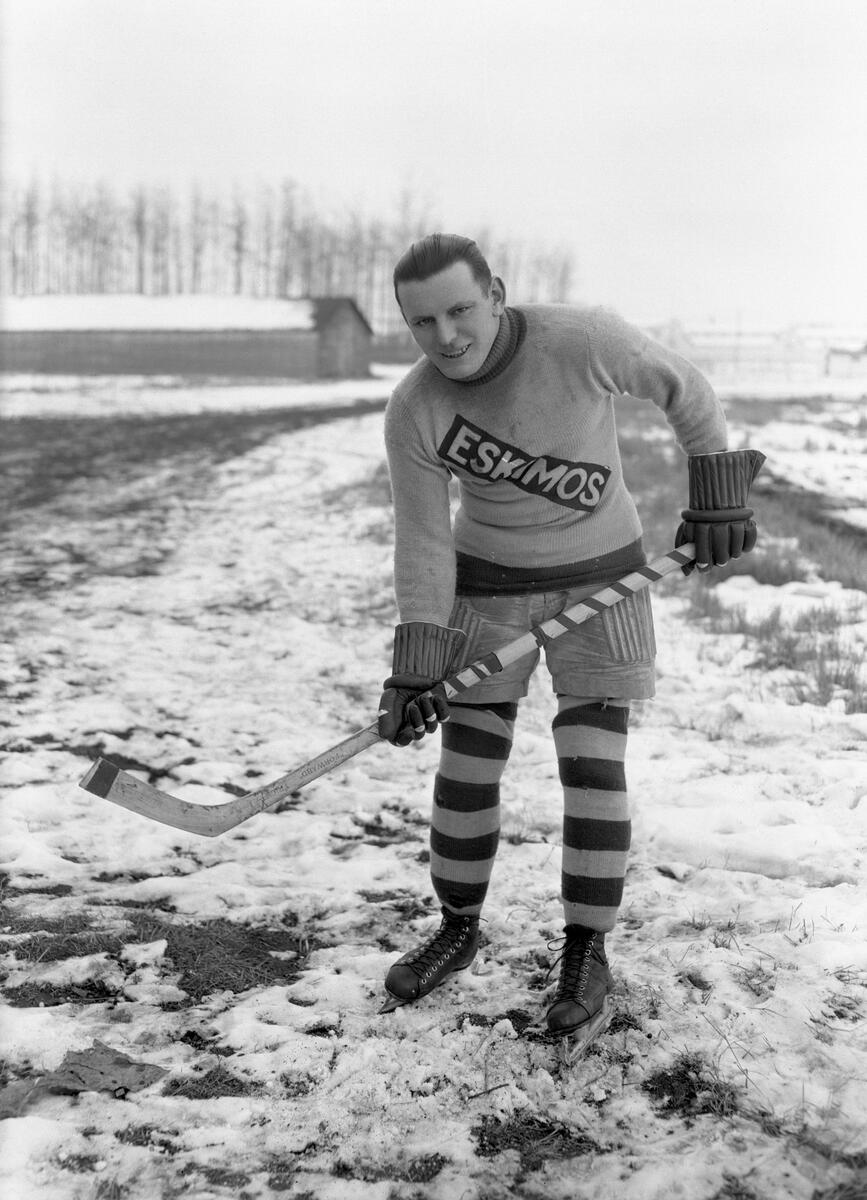
Hockey Hall of Famer Duke Keats with the Eskimos in the 1921–22 WCHL season

The Edmonton Eskimos were a Canadian amateur and later professional men's ice hockey team that existed from 1911 to 1927. After playing in senior hockey in the Alberta-based Big-4 League, the Eskimos joined the Western Canada Hockey League (WCHL) for the inaugural 1921–22 WCHL season, and played for the Stanley Cup against the Ottawa Senators in the 1923 Stanley Cup Finals, as the WCHL Champions. Team alumni include Hockey Hall of Fame members Eddie Shore, Duke Keats and Bullet Joe Simpson.

While the Edmonton Eskimos disbanded after the 1926–27 season, the name was adopted by a new team in 1932–33, playing for four years before it disbanded. The name was adopted by another new team for a single 1938–39 season.

== History ==
The Eskimos club was formed for the 1909–10 season by Edmonton sports promoter William "Deacon" White, from the remains of the amateur Edmonton Hockey Club, and inherited its predecessor's membership in the Alberta Amateur Hockey Association (AAHA). In 1909–10 and 1911–12 the club was loosely known as the "Edmonton Deacons", after Deacon White. Prior to the 1911–12 season the team officially adopted the name Edmonton Eskimos, influenced by Deacon White's Edmonton Esquimaux rugby football club. The early Eskimos played in the Thistle Rink, until it burned down in 1912.

In 1919–20, the AAHA formed the "Big Four" senior league, composed of two teams in Edmonton, and two in Calgary. This league folded in 1921, and the Eskimos helped to found the Western Canada Hockey League, with Ken McKenzie as their head coach.

The Eskimos were the WCHL regular season champion for the inaugural 1921–22 WCHL season, finishing second in the 1921–22 playoffs. The Eskimos repeated as regular season champion in the 1922–23 WCHL season, then defeated the Regina Capitals to win the 1922–23 WCHL playoff championship. The team then played in the 1923 Stanley Cup Finals against the Ottawa Senators. The Regina Capitals moved to Portland, Oregon, in the summer of 1925, leading to the WCHL renaming itself the Western Hockey League (WHL). The Eskimos won their third regular season championship in the single 1925–26 WHL season, finishing second in that season's playoffs.

The WHL disbanded after the 1925–26 season, and the Eskimos joined other WHL teams, plus some new franchises, to form the Prairie Hockey League, with the Eskimos finished last of the five teams in the inaugural 1926–27 PHL season. The Eskimos disbanded at that end of that season.

== Later incarnations ==
The name Edmonton Eskimos was adopted by an amateur senior team that played in the Western Canada Hockey League in 1932–33, which was re-formed as the North West Hockey League (NWHL) for the 1933–34 season. This Eskimos team disbanded after the 1935–36 NWHL season.

The name was adopted by a team that played in the Alberta Senior Hockey League (ASHL) in 1938–39.

== Hockey Hall of Fame ==
A number of Edmonton Eskimos players have been inducted into the Hockey Hall of Fame, recognizing their bodies of work, including their time with the Big-4/WCHL/WHL/PHL Eskimos teams:

- Tommy Dunderdale
- Duke Keats
- Eddie Shore
- Bullet Joe Simpson
- Barney Stanley

== Past players ==
- Alva Sibbetts
- Hammy Gillespie
- Everett McGowan

=== Photos from the Edmonton Eskimos' 1921–22 WCHL regular season championship team ===
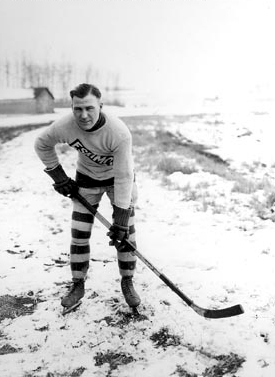
Eskimo centerman Howard Dea

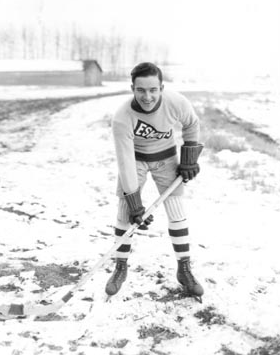
Eskimo right winger Art Gagné

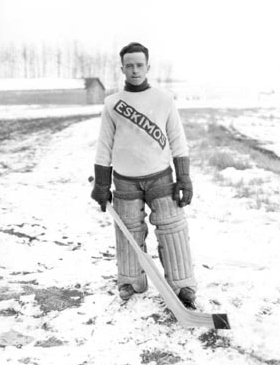
Eskimo goaltender Bill Tobin

== See also ==
- List of ice hockey teams in Alberta
