= Victoria Arena (Calgary) =

Ice hockey arena in Calgary, Alberta

Coordinates: 51.041°N 114.058°W

Victoria Arena was the main ice hockey arena in Calgary, Alberta, Canada, and one of the first. Victoria Arena was built before World War I and was the main ice hockey arena in Calgary until the Stampede Corral opened in 1950. It was located in Victoria Park, later renamed Stampede Park, home of the Calgary Stampede.

== History ==
The arena was built before World War I for the use of the army, and was originally named Horseshoe Arena. It was renamed after 1918 and taken over by the City of Calgary for the use of the Calgary Vics hockey club.

Victoria Arena was the home arena of the Calgary Tigers, a professional ice hockey team, site of its home games in the Western Canada Hockey League from 1920 through 1934. Later the Calgary Stampeders ice hockey club used it until 1950. The arena hosted the Allan Cup championship for senior men's ice hockey, which the Calgary Stampeders hosted as the Western finalist in 1946 and 1950, winning the 1946 championship.

The building was also used for horse shows and livestock.

The arena completed its useful life as a curling rink, comprising four sheets on the former ice hockey surface and an additional two sheets in attached sheds. During its final years as a curling rink the seating bleachers were condemned as unsafe and cordoned off from public access.

Lloyd Turner, manager of the Calgary Tigers, became manager of Victoria Arena in 1932, the same year that artificial ice was installed.

The arena was replaced in 1950 by the Stampede Corral arena, located nearby in Stampede Park.

== See also ==
- Royal eponyms in Canada
