= Johnny Matz =

American-Canadian ice hockey player

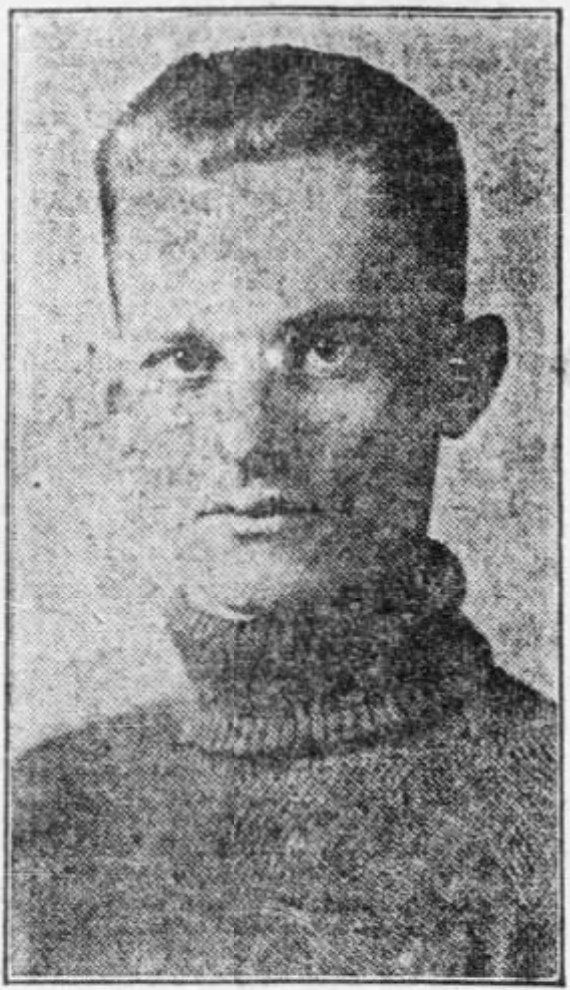
- Matz while a member of the Edmonton Hustlers in 1919–20.
- Born: June 1, 1891 Omaha, Nebraska, United States
- Died: December 21, 1969 (aged 78)
- Height: 5 ft 7 in (170 cm)
- Weight: 140 lb (64 kg; 10 st 0 lb)
- Position: Centre
- Shot: Right
- Played for: Edmonton Eskimos; Vancouver Millionaires; Saskatoon Crescents; Montreal Canadiens
- Playing career: 1911–1928

Reinhold Jean Matz (June 1, 1891 – December 21, 1969) was an American-born Canadian ice hockey player. Matz played senior amateur and professional ice hockey from 1911 until 1928, including one season in the National Hockey League for the Montreal Canadiens in 1924–25.

== Playing career ==
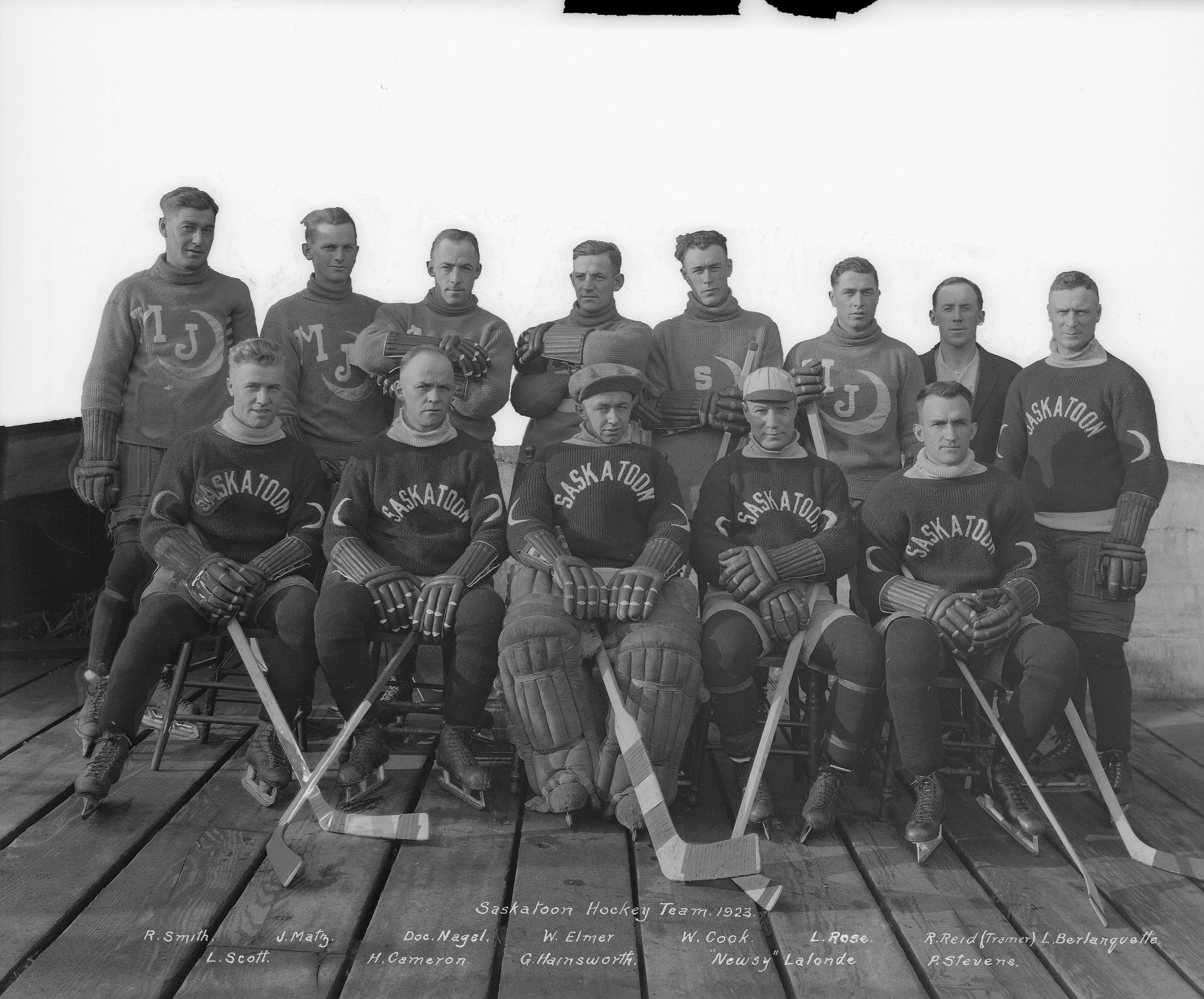
Matz, standing second from left, with the Saskatoon Sheiks/Crescents in 1923–24.

Johnny Matz began playing senior-level hockey in 1911–12 with the Edmonton YMCA of the Alberta Senior Hockey League. He next played for the Edmonton Dominions of the Edmonton League in 1912–13 and then played two seasons of ice hockey with the Grand Forks Athletic Club of the Boundary Hockey League in British Columbia. Matz played his first professional game in 1914–15 with the Vancouver Millionaires of the Pacific Coast Hockey Association (PCHA). He played one further season with the Rossland Ramblers senior team, then enlisted for duty in World War I with the Royal North West Mounted Police and saw service in Great Britain.

Back from Europe in 1919–20, Matz played two seasons for the Edmonton Hustlers and the Edmonton Dominions of the Big-4 League in Alberta. He later joined the professional Edmonton Eskimos of the West Coast Hockey League in 1921, playing one and a half seasons for the Edmonton club, as well as one and a half season for the Saskatoon Crescents of the WCHL. In 1924–25, he played one season for the Montreal Canadiens of the National Hockey League (NHL) which won the NHL championship but lost in the Stanley Cup Final against the Victoria Cougars of the WCHL. He did not play in 1925–26 due to injury but returned to Western Canada for two seasons with the Moose Jaw Maroons before retiring from ice hockey.

== Career statistics ==
=== Regular season and playoffs ===
| | | | Regular season | | | | | Playoffs |
| Season | Team | League | GP | G | A | Pts | PIM | GP | G | A | Pts | PIM |
|---|---|---|---|---|---|---|---|---|---|---|---|---|
| 1911–12 | Edmonton YMCA | ESRHL | 6 | 5 | 0 | 5 | 0 | — | — | — | — | — |
| 1911–12 | Edmonton Maritimers | ASHL | — | — | — | — | — | 3 | 3 | 0 | 3 | 5 |
| 1912–13 | Edmonton Dominions | ESRHL | 7 | 7 | 0 | 7 | 4 | — | — | — | — | — |
| 1913–14 | Grand Forks AC | BCBHL | — | — | — | — | — | — | — | — | — | — |
| 1914–15 | Grand Forks AC | BCBHL | — | — | — | — | — | — | — | — | — | — |
| 1914–15 | Vancouver Millionaires | PCHA | 1 | 1 | 0 | 1 | 0 | — | — | — | — | — |
| 1915–16 | Rossland Hockey Club | WKHL | — | — | — | — | — | — | — | — | — | — |
| 1919–20 | Edmonton Hustlers | BIG-4 | 12 | 11 | 3 | 14 | 8 | — | — | — | — | — |
| 1920–21 | Edmonton Dominions | BIG-4 | 16 | 1 | 2 | 3 | 9 | — | — | — | — | — |
| 1921–22 | Edmonton Eskimos | WCHL | 24 | 4 | 1 | 5 | 2 | 2 | 0 | 0 | 0 | 0 |
| 1922–23 | Edmonton Eskimos | WCHL | 4 | 0 | 0 | 0 | 4 | — | — | — | — | — |
| 1922–23 | Saskatoon Sheiks | WCHL | 24 | 4 | 3 | 7 | 6 | — | — | — | — | — |
| 1923–24 | Saskatoon Crescents | WCHL | 24 | 2 | 1 | 3 | 4 | — | — | — | — | — |
| 1924–25 | Montreal Canadiens | NHL | 30 | 2 | 4 | 6 | 0 | 1 | 0 | 0 | 0 | ) |
| 1924–25 | Montreal Canadiens | St-Cup | — | — | — | — | — | 4 | 0 | 0 | 0 | 2 |
| 1926–27 | Moose Jaw Warriors | PHL | 32 | 1 | 10 | 11 | 62 | — | — | — | — | — |
| 1927–28 | Moose Jaw Warriors | PHL | 28 | 3 | 3 | 6 | 44 | — | — | — | — | — |
| WCHL totals | | | 76 | 10 | 5 | 15 | 16 | 2 | 0 | 0 | 0 | 0 |
| NHL totals | | | 30 | 2 | 4 | 6 | 0 | 1 | 0 | 0 | 0 | 0 |
