= Red Conn =

Canadian ice hockey player

- Born: October 25, 1904 Hartney, Manitoba, Canada
- Died: July 19, 1964 (aged 59) Berkeley, California, United States
- Height: 5 ft 11 in (180 cm)
- Weight: 170 lb (77 kg; 12 st 2 lb)
- Position: Left wing
- Shot: Left
- Played for: New York Americans
- Playing career: 1921–1941

Hugh Maitland Harvey "Red" Conn (October 25, 1904 in Hartney, Manitoba – July 19, 1964) was a Canadian ice hockey defenceman. He played in the National Hockey League for the New York Americans between 1933 and 1935. The rest of his career, which lasted from 1921 to 1941, was spent in the minor leagues.

== Career statistics ==
=== Regular season and playoffs ===
			Regular season					Playoffs
Season	Team	League	GP	G	A	Pts	PIM	GP	G	A	Pts	PIM
1921–22	Melville Millionaires	S-SSHL	8	7	2	9	8	—	—	—	—	—
1922–23	Saskatoon Collegiate	HS-CA	—	—	—	—	—	—	—	—	—	—
1923–24	Saskatoon Civics	S-SSHL	5	4	0	4	4	—	—	—	—	—
1924–25	Saskatoon Civics	S-SSHL	—	—	—	—	—	—	—	—	—	—
1925–26	Melville Millionaires	S-SSHL	17	8	13	21	18	—	—	—	—	—
1926–27	Regina Capitals	PrHL	17	3	1	4	26	—	—	—	—	—
1926–27	Moose Jaw Warriors	PrHL	16	8	4	12	17	—	—	—	—	—
1927–28	Moose Jaw Maroons	PrHL	28	14	7	21	36	—	—	—	—	—
1928–29	Portland Buckaroos	PCHL	36	16	3	19	44	1	0	0	0	0
1929–30	Portland Buckaroos	PCHL	36	6	4	10	22	4	1	0	1	0
1930–31	Portland Buckaroos	PCHL	33	9	6	15	54	—	—	—	—	—
1931–32	Boston Cubs	Can-Am	40	8	11	19	43	5	2	0	2	13
1932–33	Philadelphia Arrows	Can-Am	42	15	16	31	38	3	0	0	0	0
1933–34	New York Americans	NHL	48	4	17	21	12	—	—	—	—	—
1933–34	Edmonton Eskimos	NWHL	1	0	0	0	0	—	—	—	—	—
1934–35	New York Americans	NHL	48	5	11	16	10	—	—	—	—	—
1935–36	Providence Reds	Can-Am	45	11	15	26	30	7	1	3	4	4
1936–37	Springfield Indians	IAHL	45	9	6	15	26	5	1	2	3	2
1937–38	Vancouver Lions	PCHL	41	10	14	24	20	6	1	4	5	2
1938–39	Portland Buckaroos	PCHL	43	9	26	35	58	5	1	1	2	10
1939–40	Portland Buckaroos	PCHL	32	3	3	6	20	5	0	0	0	8
1940–41	Portland Buckaroos	PCHL	48	11	10	21	91	—	—	—	—	—
PCHL totals			269	64	66	130	309	21	3	5	8	20
NHL totals			96	9	28	37	22	—	—	—	—	—
