= Max Sutherland (ice hockey) =

Canadian ice hockey player

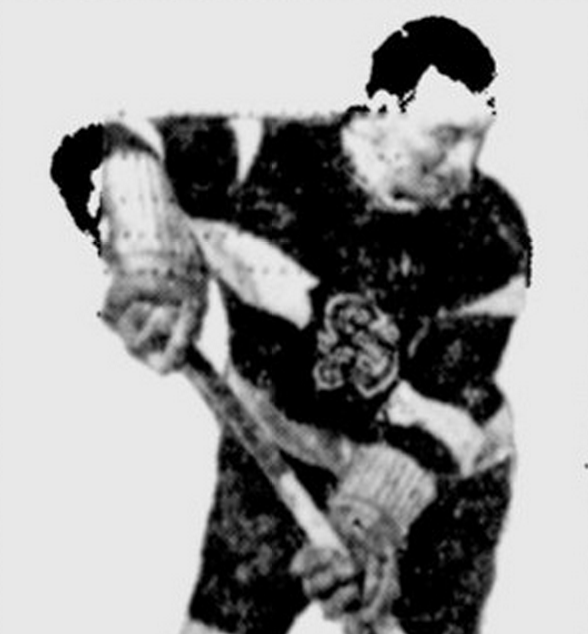
- Born: April 3, 1904 Grenfell, Northwest Territories, Canada
- Died: February 11, 1984 (aged 79) Calgary, Alberta, Canada
- Height: 5 ft 10 in (178 cm)
- Weight: 165 lb (75 kg; 11 st 11 lb)
- Position: Left wing
- Shot: Left
- Played for: Boston Bruins
- Playing career: 1923–1939

Reginald McGregor "Max" Sutherland (April 3, 1904 – February 11, 1984) was a Canadian professional ice hockey player who played two games in the National Hockey League with the Boston Bruins during the 1931–32 season. The rest of his career, which lasted from 1923 to 1939, was spent in various minor leagues. Sutherland was born in Grenfell, Saskatchewan and later served in the Second World War, serving in the Canadian Army, having participated and received injuries to an eye (that was eventually removed) in the Dieppe Raid. In 1944, he was living in Calgary. He died there in 1984 and was buried in the Field of Honour at Mountain View Memorial Gardens.

== Career statistics ==
=== Regular season and playoffs ===
			Regular season					Playoffs
Season	Team	League	GP	G	A	Pts	PIM	GP	G	A	Pts	PIM
1921–22	Moose Jaw Monarchs	S-SJHL	1	0	0	0	0	—	—	—	—	—
1922–23	Moose Jaw Maple Leafs	S-SJHL	10	5	0	5	4	—	—	—	—	—
1923–24	Moose Jaw Canucks	S-SJHL	6	2	4	6	3	—	—	—	—	—
1923–24	Pense Wanderers	S-SSHL	2	1	2	3	0	—	—	—	—	—
1924–25	Moose Jaw Millers	S-SJHL	8	6	0	6	14	—	—	—	—	—
1925–26	Moose Jaw Millers	S-SJHL	18	13	5	18	12	—	—	—	—	—
1926–27	Moose Jaw Millers	PHL	32	17	7	24	38	—	—	—	—	—
1927–28	Moose Jaw Maroons	PHL	28	13	5	18	53	—	—	—	—	—
1928–29	Seattle Eskimos	PCHL	30	5	1	6	80	5	0	0	0	12
1929–30	Seattle Eskimos	PCHL	36	10	3	13	102	—	—	—	—	—
1930–31	Seattle Eskimos	PCHL	34	9	2	11	96	4	1	0	1	2
1931–32	Boston Bruins	NHL	2	0	0	0	0	—	—	—	—	—
1931–32	Boston Cubs	Can-Am	35	7	7	14	51	6	2	0	2	11
1932–33	Calgary Tigers	WCHL	30	10	4	14	51	6	0	2	2	11
1933–34	Calgary Tigers	NWHL	28	14	4	18	50	5	2	0	2	4
1934–35	Calgary Tigers	NWHL	18	5	3	8	4	—	—	—	—	—
1936–37	Olds Elks	ASHL	10	12	15	27	17	—	—	—	—	—
1937–38	Olds Elks	ASHL	25	12	10	22	31	3	1	0	1	6
1938–39	Olds Elks	ASHL	13	7	6	13	30	—	—	—	—	—
PCHL totals			100	24	6	30	278	9	1	0	1	14
NHL totals			2	0	0	0	0	—	—	—	—	—
