= Art Giroux =

Canadian ice hockey player

- Born: June 6, 1908 Winnipeg, Manitoba, Canada
- Died: June 5, 1982 (aged 73) Calgary, Alberta, Canada
- Height: 5 ft 10 in (178 cm)
- Weight: 165 lb (75 kg; 11 st 11 lb)
- Position: Right wing
- Shot: Right
- Played for: Montreal Canadiens; Boston Bruins; Detroit Red Wings
- Playing career: 1926–1945

Arthur Joseph Giroux (June 6, 1908 – June 5, 1982) was a Canadian professional ice hockey right winger who played three seasons in the National Hockey League for the Montreal Canadiens, Detroit Red Wings and Boston Bruins between 1932 and 1936. Giroux was included in Detroit's 1936 team picture, but left off the Stanley Cup. He spent most of the season in the minors and did not play in the NHL during the playoffs. Giroux also played several seasons in various minor leagues during his career, which lasted from 1926 to 1945.

== Career statistics ==
=== Regular season and playoffs ===
| | | | Regular season | | | | | Playoffs |
| Season | Team | League | GP | G | A | Pts | PIM | GP | G | A | Pts | PIM |
|---|---|---|---|---|---|---|---|---|---|---|---|---|
| 1926–27 | Saskatoon Sheiks | PrHL | 27 | 1 | 0 | 1 | 4 | 2 | 0 | 0 | 0 | 0 |
| 1927–28 | Saskatoon Sheikhs | PrHL | 19 | 6 | 1 | 7 | 2 | — | — | — | — | — |
| 1928–29 | Los Angeles Richfields | Cal-Pro | — | 7 | 1 | 8 | — | — | — | — | — | — |
| 1929–30 | San Francisco Tigers | Cal-Pro | — | 34 | 10 | 44 | 59 | — | — | — | — | — |
| 1930–31 | Providence Reds | Can-Am | 39 | 16 | 7 | 23 | 41 | 2 | 0 | 0 | 0 | 4 |
| 1931–32 | Providence Reds | Can-Am | 36 | 11 | 10 | 21 | 25 | 5 | 3 | 1 | 4 | 2 |
| 1932–33 | Montreal Canadiens | NHL | 40 | 5 | 2 | 7 | 14 | 2 | 0 | 0 | 0 | 0 |
| 1932–33 | Providence Reds | Can-Am | 6 | 5 | 1 | 6 | 4 | — | — | — | — | — |
| 1933–34 | Providence Reds | Can-Am | 40 | 20 | 15 | 35 | 28 | 3 | 7 | 1 | 8 | 6 |
| 1934–35 | Boston Bruins | NHL | 10 | 1 | 0 | 1 | 0 | — | — | — | — | — |
| 1934–35 | Boston Tigers | Can-Am | 32 | 20 | 16 | 36 | 19 | 3 | 1 | 0 | 1 | 0 |
| 1935–36 | Detroit Red Wings | NHL | 4 | 0 | 2 | 2 | 0 | — | — | — | — | — |
| 1935–36 | Detroit Olympics | IHL | 35 | 17 | 12 | 29 | 28 | 6 | 4 | 4 | 8 | 4 |
| 1936–37 | Pittsburgh Hornets | IAHL | 47 | 21 | 7 | 28 | 30 | 5 | 3 | 0 | 3 | 2 |
| 1937–38 | Providence Reds | IAHL | 43 | 12 | 10 | 22 | 13 | 7 | 3 | 5 | 8 | 2 |
| 1938–39 | Providence Reds | IAHL | 51 | 23 | 24 | 47 | 4 | 5 | 1 | 1 | 2 | 0 |
| 1939–40 | Providence Reds | IAHL | 54 | 17 | 23 | 40 | 21 | 8 | 2 | 2 | 4 | 0 |
| 1940–41 | Providence Reds | AHL | 48 | 20 | 19 | 39 | 12 | 4 | 1 | 1 | 2 | 0 |
| 1941–42 | Cleveland Barons | AHL | 54 | 18 | 22 | 40 | 18 | 5 | 1 | 0 | 1 | 2 |
| 1942–43 | Cleveland Barons | AHL | 53 | 13 | 11 | 24 | 22 | 2 | 0 | 0 | 0 | 0 |
| 1943–44 | Providence Reds | AHL | 31 | 12 | 10 | 22 | 5 | — | — | — | — | — |
| 1943–44 | Pittsburgh Hornets | AHL | 11 | 11 | 5 | 16 | 0 | — | — | — | — | — |
| 1944–45 | Pittsburgh Hornets | AHL | 3 | 0 | 2 | 2 | 2 | — | — | — | — | — |
| 1944–45 | St. Louis Flyers | AHL | 40 | 18 | 15 | 33 | 6 | — | — | — | — | — |
| IAHL/AHL totals | | | 435 | 165 | 148 | 313 | 133 | 36 | 11 | 9 | 20 | 6 |
| NHL totals | | | 54 | 6 | 4 | 10 | 14 | 2 | 0 | 0 | 0 | 0 |
