= Amby Moran =

Canadian ice hockey player

- Born: August 27, 1896 Winnipeg, Manitoba, Canada
- Died: April 8, 1958 (aged 61) Ottawa, Ontario, Canada
- Position: Defence
- Shot: Left
- Played for: Regina Capitals; Vancouver Maroons; Montreal Canadiens; Chicago Black Hawks
- Playing career: 1921–1931

Ambrose Joseph Jason Moran (August 27, 1896 – April 8, 1958) was a Canadian ice hockey defenceman who played 35 games in the National Hockey League for the Montreal Canadiens and Chicago Black Hawks between 1926 and 1928. Prior to that he played in the Western Canada Hockey League with the Regina Capitals and Vancouver Maroons from 1921 to 1926, and then played in minor leagues until retiring in 1931.

Moran was born in Winnipeg, Manitoba to James and Bridget (Durkin) Moran both from Ireland.

== Career statistics ==
=== Regular season and playoffs ===
			Regular season					Playoffs
Season	Team	League	GP	G	A	Pts	PIM	GP	G	A	Pts	PIM
1919–20	Winnipeg Hockey Club	WSrHL	4	3	1	4	2	—	—	—	—	—
1919–20	Winnipeg Hockey Club	Al-Cup	—	—	—	—	—	1	0	0	0	0
1920–21	Brandon Elks	MHL	12	12	4	16	16	6	9	1	10	4
1920–21	Brandon Elks	Al-Cup	—	—	—	—	—	5	5	1	6	2
1921–22	Regina Capitals	WCHL	25	7	2	9	18	6	1	0	1	12
1922–23	Regina Capitals	WCHL	28	15	8	23	37	2	0	1	1	0
1923–24	Regina Capitals	WCHL	14	2	0	2	6	—	—	—	—	—
1924–25	Regina Capitals	WCHL	6	0	0	0	8	—	—	—	—	—
1924–25	Vancouver Maroons	WCHL	15	10	1	11	26	—	—	—	—	—
1925–26	Vancouver Maroons	WHL	30	5	0	5	30	—	—	—	—	—
1926–27	Montreal Canadiens	NHL	12	0	0	0	10	—	—	—	—	—
1926–27	New Haven Eagles	Can-Am	6	0	0	0	10	—	—	—	—	—
1926–27	Moose Jaw Warriors	PHL	11	7	0	7	10	—	—	—	—	—
1927–28	Chicago Black Hawks	NHL	23	1	1	2	14	—	—	—	—	—
1927–28	Moose Jaw Maroons	PHL	12	3	2	5	35	—	—	—	—	—
1928–29	Tulsa Oilers	AHA	34	3	1	4	26	4	0	0	0	0
1929–30	Tulsa Oilers	AHA	4	0	0	0	0	—	—	—	—	—
1929–30	St. Louis Flyers	AHA	1	0	0	0	0	—	—	—	—	—
1930–31	St. Louis Flyers	AHA	6	1	0	1	0	—	—	—	—	—
1930–31	Buffalo Majors	AHA	1	0	1	1	0	—	—	—	—	—
WCHL/WHL totals			118	39	11	50	125	8	1	1	2	12
NHL totals			35	1	1	2	24	—	—	—	—	—
