= List of Montreal Canadiens players =

This is a full list of ice hockey players who have played for the Montreal Canadiens in the National Hockey League (NHL). It includes players that have played at least one regular season or playoff game for the Montreal Canadiens since the team joined the NHL in 1917. Founded in 1909 as one of the founding members of the National Hockey Association (NHA), the Montreal Canadiens were also one of the founding members of the NHL.

As of May 5, 2019, 83 goaltenders and 777 skaters (forwards and defencemen) have appeared in at least one regular-season or playoff game with the Montreal Canadiens since the formation of the league in the 1917–18 NHL season. The 709 all-time members of the Canadiens are listed below, with statistics complete through the end of the 2013–14 NHL season. This list does not include members of the Montreal Canadiens while the team was a member of the NHA from 1909 until 1917.

The "Seasons" column lists the first year of the season of the player's first game and the last year of the season of the player's last game. For example, a player who played one game in the 2000–01 season would be listed as playing with the team from 2000–01, regardless of what calendar year the game occurred within.

== Key ==
Appeared in a Canadiens game during the 2024–25 season

Abbreviations
Nat	Country of birth
GP	Games played

Goaltenders
W	Wins	SO	Shutouts
L	Losses	GAA	Goals against average
T	Ties	SV%	Save percentage
OTL	Overtime loss		

Skaters
Pos	Position	RW	Right wing	A	Assists
D	Defenceman	C	Centre	P	Points
LW	Left wing	G	Goals	PIM	Penalty minutes

== Goaltenders ==
Note: Stats are updated through to the end of the 2024–25 season

	Nat	Seasons	Regular season								Playoffs						Notes
	Nat	Seasons	GP	W	L	T	OTL	SO	GAA	SV%	GP	W	L	SO	GAA	SV%	Notes
Aebischer, David	(Switzerland)	2005–2007	39	17	15	—	3	0	3.28	.898	—	—	—	—	—	—	
Aiken, John	(United States)	1957–1958	1	0	1	0	—	0	10.59	—	—	—	—	—	—	—	
Allen, Jake	(Canada)	2020–2024	127	41	68	—	15	3	3.30	.899	—	—	—	—	—	—	
Auld, Alex	(Canada)	2011–2013	16	6	2	—	2	0	2.64	.914	—	—	—	—	—	—	
Bauman, Gary	(Canada)	1966–1967	2	1	1	0	—	0	2.50	—	—	—	—	—	—	—	
Bergeron, Jean-Claude	(Canada)	1990–1991	18	7	6	2	—	0	3.76	.862	—	—	—	—	—	—	
Bibeault, Paul	(Canada)	1940–1943; 1945–1946	102	41	46	14	—	2	3.55	—	8	2	6	2	3.12	—	
Binette, Andre	(Canada)	1954–1955	1	1	0	0	—	0	4.00	—	—	—	—	—	—	—	
Bourque, Claude	(Canada)	1938–1940	61	16	37	8	—	4	3.02	—	3	1	2	1	2.55	—	
Broderick, Len	(Canada)	1957–1958	1	1	0	0	—	0	2.00	—	—	—	—	—	—	—	
Budaj, Peter	(Slovakia)	2012–2014	54	23	16	—	9	2	2.47	.910	7	0	2	0	5.10	.843	
Chabot, Frederic	(Canada)	1990–1991; 1992–1994; 1998–1999	16	1	4	1	—	0	2.63	.899	—	—	—	—	—	—	
Chabot, Lorne	(Canada)	1933–1934	47	21	20	6	—	8	2.07	—	—	—	—	—	—	—	
Condon, Mike	(United States)	2015–2016	55	21	25	—	6	1	2.71	.903	—	—	—	—	—	—	
Cox, Abbie	(Canada)	1935–1936	1	0	0	1	—	0	.860	—	—	—	—	—	—	—	
Cude, Wilf	(United Kingdom)	1933–1941	220	82	100	38	—	18	2.65	—	10	3	6	0	2.71	—	
Cyr, Claude	(Canada)	1958–1959	1	0	0	0	—	0	3.00	—	—	—	—	—	—	—	
Danis, Yann	(Canada)	2005–2006	6	3	2	—	0	1	2.69	.908	—	—	—	—	—	—	
DeJordy, Denis	(Canada)	1971–1972	7	3	2	1	—	0	4.52	—	—	—	—	—	—	—	
Denis, Marc	(Canada)	2008–2009	1	0	0	—	0	0	3.00	.857	—	—	—	—	—	—	
Dobes, Jakub	(Czech Republic)	2024–2025	16	7	4	—	3	1	2.74	.909	3	1	2	0	2.91	.881	
Dryden, Ken	(Canada)	1970–1973; 1974–1979	397	258	57	74	—	46	2.24	—	112	80	32	10	2.40	—	
Durnan, Bill	(Canada)	1943–1950	383	208	112	62	—	34	2.36	—	45	27	18	2	2.07	—	
Esposito, Tony	(Canada)	1968–1969	13	5	4	4	—	2	2.73	—	—	—	—	—	—	—	
Evans, Claude	(Canada)	1954–1955	4	1	2	0	—	0	3.60	—	—	—	—	—	—	—	
Exelby, Randy	(Canada)	1988–1989	1	0	0	0	—	0	0.00	1.00	—	—	—	—	—	—	
Fichaud, Eric	(Canada)	2000–2001; 2002–2003	2	0	2	0	—	0	3.89	.875	—	—	—	—	—	—	
Fiset, Stephane	(Canada)	2001–2002	2	0	1	0	—	0	3.85	.883	1	0	0	0	4.72	.842	
Gardiner, Bert	(Canada)	1940–1942	52	14	31	7	—	2	3.00	—	3	1	2	0	2.24	—	
Garon, Mathieu	(Canada)	2000–2004	43	16	20	3	—	4	2.49	.914	1	0	0	0	0.00	1.00	
Gauthier, Paul	(Canada)	1937–1938	1	0	0	1	—	0	1.71	—	—	—	—	—	—	—	
Hackett, Jeff	(Canada)	1998–2003	161	63	68	22	—	8	2.53	.912	—	—	—	—	—	—	
Hainsworth, George	(Canada)	1926–1933; 1936–1937	318	167	97	54	—	75	1.78	—	31	13	13	6	1.70	—	
Halak, Jaroslav	(Slovakia)	2006–2010	101	56	34	—	7	9	2.62	.919	23	10	11	0	2.42	.923	
Hammond, Andrew	(Canada)	2021–2022	4	3	0	—	0	0	2.40	.920	—	—	—	—	—	—	
Hayward, Brian	(Canada)	1986–1990	141	71	48	17	—	5	2.96	.900	20	9	8	0	2.74	.903	
Herron, Denis	(Canada)	1979–1982	86	43	18	17	—	4	2.80	—	5	2	3	0	3.00	—	
Hodge, Charlie	(Canada)	1954–1955; 1957–1961; 1963–1967	237	115	72	40	—	21	2.46	—	16	7	8	2	2.39	—	
Holden, Mark	(United States)	1981–1984	4	0	2	1	—	0	3.77	—	—	—	—	—	—	—	
Huet, Cristobal	(France)	2005–2008	117	58	39	—	13	11	2.53	.920	6	2	4	0	2.33	.929	
Jablonski, Pat	(United States)	1995–1997	40	9	15	8	—	0	3.33	.900	1	0	0	0	1.24	.941	
Karakas, Mike	(United States)	1939–1940	5	0	4	1	—	0	3.48	—	—	—	—	—	—	—	
Kinkaid, Keith	(United States)	2019–2020	6	1	1	—	3	0	4.24	.875	—	—	—	—	—	—	
Kuntar, Les	(United States)	1993–1994	6	2	2	0	—	0	3.18	.877	—	—	—	—	—	—	
Labrecque, Patrick	(Canada)	1995–1996	2	0	1	0	—	0	4.29	.851	—	—	—	—	—	—	
Lacroix, Alphonse	(United States)	1925–1926	5	1	4	0	—	0	3.43	—	—	—	—	—	—	—	
Larocque, Michel	(Canada)	1973–1981	231	144	48	31	—	17	2,83	—	12	6	5	1	2.54	—	
Lindgren, Charlie	(United States)	2015–2020	24	10	12	—	2	2	3.00	.907	—	—	—	—	—	—	
Maniago, Cesare	(Canada)	1962–1963	14	5	5	4	—	0	3.07	—	—	—	—	—	—	—	
McNeil, Gerry	(Canada)	1947–1948; 1949–1954; 1956–1957	276	119	105	52	—	28	2.36	—	35	17	18	5	1.89	—	
McNiven, Michael	(Canada)	2021–2022	1	0	0	—	0	0	9.00	.571	—	—	—	—	—	—	
Melanson, Roland	(Canada)	1991–1992	9	5	3	0	—	2	2.68	.887	—	—	—	—	—	—	
Michaud, Olivier	(Canada)	2001–2002	1	0	0	0	—	0	0.00	1.000	—	—	—	—	—	—	
Montembeault, Sam	(Canada)	2021–2025	181	71	76	—	25	5	3.21	.900	3	0	2	0	2.76	.908	
Montoya, Al	(United States)	2016–2018	23	10	7	—	3	2	2.85	.905	—	—	—	—	—	—	
Moog, Andy	(Canada)	1997–1998	42	18	17	5	—	3	2.49	.905	9	4	5	1	3.04	.882	
Morissette, Jean-Guy	(Canada)	1963–1964	1	0	1	0	—	0	6.67	—	—	—	—	—	—	—	
Murphy, Hal	(Canada)	1952–1953	1	1	0	0	—	0	4.00	—	—	—	—	—	—	—	
Murray, Mickey	(Canada)	1929–1930	1	0	1	0	—	0	4.00	—	—	—	—	—	—	—	
Myre, Phil	(Canada)	1969–1972	49	21	19	6	—	1	3.06	—	—	—	—	—	—	—	
Niemi, Antti	(Finland)	2017–2019	36	15	11	—	6	1	3.10	.909	—	—	—	—	—	—	
Penney, Steve	(Canada)	1983–1986	76	32	30	10	—	1	3.45	.881	27	15	12	4	2.69	.901	
Perreault, Bob	(Canada)	1955–1956	6	3	3	0	—	1	2.00	—	—	—	—	—	—	—	
Plante, Jacques	(Canada)	1952–1963	556	314	133	107	—	58	2.23	—	90	59	28	10	2.13	—	
Plasse, Michel	(Canada)	1972–1974	32	18	6	5	—	0	3.29	—	—	—	—	—	—	—	
Price, Carey	(Canada)	2007–2022	712	361	261	—	79	49	2.51	.917	92	43	45	8	2.39	.919	
Primeau, Cayden	(United States)	2019–2025	55	13	24	—	7	2	3.69	.884	—	—	—	—	—	—	
Pronovost, Claude	(Canada)	1958–1959	2	0	1	0	—	0	7.00	—	—	—	—	—	—	—	
Racicot, Andre	(Canada)	1989–1994	68	26	23	8	—	2	3.50	.880	4	0	1	0	7.68	.833	
Rheaume, Herb	(Canada)	1925–1926	10	20	1	0	—	0	2.92	—	—	—	—	—	—	—	
Riendeau, Vincent	(Canada)	1987–1988	1	0	0	0	—	0	8.24	.773	—	—	—	—	—	—	
Roy, Patrick	(Canada)	1984–1996	551	289	175	66	—	29	2.78	.912	114	70	42	5	2.46	.920	
Scrivens, Ben	(Canada)	2015–2016	15	5	8	—	0	0	3.07	.906	—	—	—	—	—	—	
Sevigny, Richard	(Canada)	1979–1984	141	67	41	17	—	4	3.10	—	4	0	3	0	3.75	—	
Soetaert, Doug	(Canada)	1984–1986	51	25	16	6	—	3	2.13	.887	1	0	0	0	3.00	.889	
Theodore, Jose	(Canada)	1995–1997; 1998–2006	353	141	158	30	0	23	2.62	.911	28	11	15	1	2.54	.921	
Thibault, Jocelyn	(Canada)	1995–1999	158	67	56	24	—	7	2.73	.908	11	2	7	0	3.94	.885	
Thomas, Wayne	(Canada)	1972–1974	52	31	13	5	—	2	2.69	—	—	—	—	—	—	—	
Tokarski, Dustin	(Canada)	2013–2016	26	9	9	—	4	1	2.71	.910	5	2	3	0	2.60	.916	
Tugnutt, Ron	(Canada)	1993–1995	15	3	6	2	—	0	3.48	.878	1	0	1	0	5.05	.800	
Vachon, Rogatien	(Canada)	1966–1972	206	110	56	30	—	13	2.56	—	19	14	5	1	1.94	—	
Vezina, Georges	(Canada)	1917–1926	190	103	81	5	—	13	3.28	—	13	10	3	2	2.69	—	
Vokoun, Tomas	(Czech Republic)	1996–1997	1	0	0	0	—	0	12.00	.714	—	—	—	—	—	—	
Wakely, Ernest	(Canada)	1962–1963; 1968–1969	2	1	1	0	—	0	3.50	—	—	—	—	—	—	—	
Wamsley, Rick	(Canada)	1980–1984	131	72	36	16	—	5	3.29	—	9	2	6	0	2.23	—	
Worsley, Gump	(Canada)	1963–1970	172	92	44	25	—	16	2.42	—	39	29	7	4	1.91	—	
Worters, Roy	(Canada)	1929–1930	1	1	0	0	—	0	2.00	—	—	—	—	—	—	—	

== Skaters ==
Note: Stats are updated through to the end of the 2024–2025 season.

	Nat	Pos	Seasons	Regular season					Playoffs					Notes
	Nat	Pos	Seasons	GP	G	A	P	PIM	GP	G	A	P	PIM	Notes
Abbott, Reg	(Canada)	C	1952–1953	3	0	0	0	0	—	—	—	—	—	
Achtymichuk, Gene	(Canada)	C	1951–1952; 1956–1958	20	3	5	8	2	—	—	—	—	—	
Acton, Keith	(Canada)	C	1979–1984	228	78	110	188	229	10	0	4	4	22	
Adams, Jack	(Canada)	LW	1940–1941	42	6	12	18	11	3	0	0	0	0	
Agostino, Kenny	(United States)	LW	2018–2019	36	2	9	11	26	—	—	—	—	—	
Alexandre, Art	(Canada)	LW	1931–1933	11	0	2	2	8	4	0	0	0	0	
Allard, Frederic	(Canada)	D	2022–2023	3	0	0	0	0	—	—	—	—	—	
Allen, George	(Canada)	LW	1946–1947	49	7	14	21	12	11	1	3	4	6	
Allison, Dave	(Canada)	D	1983–1984	3	0	0	0	12	—	—	—	—	—	
Alzner, Karl	(Canada)	D	2017–2020	95	1	12	13	42	—	—	—	—	—	
Anderson, Doug	(Canada)	C	1952–1953	—	—	—	—	—	2	0	0	0	0	
Anderson, Josh	(Canada)	RW	2020–2025	349	81	54	135	339	27	5	2	7	32	
Andrighetto, Sven	(Switzerland)	RW	2014–2017	83	11	17	28	10	—	—	—	—	—	
Andruff, Ron	(Canada)	C	1974–1976	6	0	0	0	2	—	—	—	—	—	
Arbour, Amos	(Canada)	LW	1918–1921	46	36	8	44	53	—	—	—	—	—	
Armia, Joel	(Finland)	RW	2018–2025	406	77	72	149	138	36	8	7	15	22	
Arnason, Ernest	(Canada)	RW	1971–1973	36	4	1	5	6	—	—	—	—	—	
Asham, Arron	(Canada)	RW	1998–2002	121	11	9	20	138	3	0	0	0	0	
Asmundson, Ossie	(Canada)	C	1937–1938	2	0	0	0	0	—	—	—	—	—	
Audette, Donald	(Canada)	RW	2001–2004	90	15	22	37	43	12	6	4	10	10	
Awrey, Don	(Canada)	D	1974–1976	128	1	23	24	87	11	0	6	6	12	
Backstrom, Ralph	(Canada)	C	1956–1971	844	215	287	502	348	100	22	26	48	68	
Baddock, Brandon	(Canada)	C	2021–2022	1	0	0	0	0	—	—	—	—	—	
Baker, Bill	(United States)	D	1980–1981	11	0	0	0	32	—	—	—	—	—	
Balej, Jozef	(Slovakia)	RW	2003–2004	4	0	0	0	0	—	—	—	—	—	
Balfour, Murray	(Canada)	RW	1956–1958	5	1	1	2	6	—	—	—	—	—	
Balon, Dave	(Canada)	LW	1963–1967	226	56	56	112	196	35	3	6	9	57	
Barber, Riley	(United States)	RW	2019–2020	9	0	0	0	2	—	—	—	—	—	
Barberio, Mark	(Canada)	D	2015–2017	56	2	12	14	16	—	—	—	—	—	
Baron, Murray	(Canada)	D	1996–1997	60	1	5	6	107	—	—	—	—	—	
Baron, Normand	(Canada)	LW	1983–1984	4	0	0	0	12	3	0	0	0	22	
Barre-Boulet, Alex	(Canada)	F	2024–2025	2	0	0	0	2	—	—	—	—	—	
Barron, Justin	(Canada)	D	2021–2025	109	13	18	31	44	—	—	—	—	—	
Barry, Marty	(Canada)	C	1939–1940	30	4	10	14	2	—	—	—	—	—	
Bartlett, Jim	(Canada)	LW	1954–1955	2	0	0	0	4	2	0	0	0	0	
Bartley, Victor	(Canada)	D	2015–2016	9	0	0	0	6	—	—	—	—	—	
Scandella, Marco	(Canada)	D	2020–2020	20	1	2	3	8	—	—	—	—	—	
Bashkirov, Andre	(Russia)	LW	1998–2001	30	0	3	3	0	—	—	—	—	—	
Beauchemin, Francois	(Canada)	D	2002–2003	1	0	0	0	0	—	—	—	—	—	
Beaulieu, Nathan	(Canada)	D	2012–2017	225	7	53	60	152	17	0	4	4	2	
Beck, Owen	(Canada)	C	2022–2025	13	0	1	1	0	—	—	—	—	—	
Begin, Steve	(Canada)	LW	2005–2009	266	35	31	66	275	23	0	4	4	20	
Belanger, Francis	(Canada)	LW	2000–2001	10	0	0	0	29	—	—	—	—	—	
Belanger, Jesse	(Canada)	C	1991–1993; 1999–2000	39	7	8	15	6	9	0	1	1	0	
Beliveau, Jean	(Canada)	C	1950–1951; 1952–1971	1125	507	712	1219	1029	162	79	97	176	211	
Bell, Billy	(Canada)	C	1917–1919; 1920–1924	47	1	0	1	10	4	0	0	0	0	
Belle, Shawn	(Canada)	D	2009–2010	2	0	0	0	0	—	—	—	—	—	
Bellows, Brian	(Canada)	LW	1992–1995	200	81	94	175	88	24	7	11	18	20	
Belzile, Alex	(Canada)	F	2020–2023	44	6	9	15	17	6	0	1	1	0	
Benn, Jordie	(Canada)	D	2016–2019	171	11	28	39	77	6	0	0	0	6	
Bennett, Max	(Canada)	RW	1935–1936	1	0	0	0	0	—	—	—	—	—	
Benoit, Joe	(Canada)	RW	1940–1943; 1945–1947	185	75	69	144	94	11	6	3	9	11	
Berenson, Red	(Canada)	C	1961–1966	136	14	23	37	43	26	2	—1	3	6	
Berezin, Sergei	(Russia)	LW	2001–2002	29	4	6	10	4	6	1	1	2	0	
Bergeron, Marc-Andre	(Canada)	D	2009–2010	60	13	21	34	16	19	2	4	6	10	
Berlinguette, Louis	(Canada)	LW	1917–1923	134	41	31	72	99	9	0	5	5	9	
Bournival, Michael	(Canada)	LW	2013–2015	60	7	7	14	18	14	0	1	1	0	
Berry, Bob	(Canada)	LW	1968–1969	2	0	0	0	0	—	—	—	—	—	
Bertrand, Eric	(Canada)	LW	2000–2001	3	0	0	0	0	—	—	—	—	—	
Blain, Garry	(Canada)	RW	1954–1955	1	0	0	0	0	—	—	—	—	—	
Blake, Toe	(Canada)	LW	1935–1948	569	235	292	527	272	57	25	37	62	23	
Blouin, Sylvain	(Canada)	LW	1998–1999; 2002–2003	22	0	0	0	62	—	—	—	—	—	
Boisvert, Serge	(Canada)	RW	1984–1988	29	5	5	10	4	23	3	7	10	4	
Bonin, Marcel	(Canada)	LW	1957–1962	280	68	137	205	220	34	11	11	22	47	
Bonk, Radek	(Czech Republic)	C	2005–2007	135	19	25	44	106	6	2	0	2	2	
Bordeleau, Christian	(Canada)	C	1968–1970	61	3	16	19	22	6	1	0	1	0	
Bordeleau, Sebastien	(Canada)	C	1995–1998	85	8	17	25	38	5	0	0	0	2	
Bouchard, Edmond	(Canada)	LW	1921–1923	20	1	5	6	8	—	—	—	—	—	
Bouchard, Emile "Butch"	(Canada)	D	1941–1956	785	49	144	193	863	113	11	21	32	121	
Bouchard, Pierre	(Canada)	D	1970–1978	489	16	66	82	379	76	3	10	13	56	
Boucher, Billy	(Canada)	RW	1921–1927	156	86	36	122	339	6	3	0	3	15	
Boucher, Robert	(Canada)	C	1923–1924	11	1	0	1	0	2	0	0	0	0	
Boudrias, Andre	(Canada)	LW	1963–1965; 1966–1967	7	1	5	6	4	—	—	—	—	—	
Bouillon, Francis	(United States)	D	1999–2009	481	21	81	102	369	25	2	4	6	21	
Bourcier, Conrad	(Canada)	C	1935–1936	6	0	0	0	0	—	—	—	—	—	
Bourcier, Jean	(Canada)	LW	1935–1936	9	0	1	1	0	—	—	—	—	—	
Bourque, Rene	(Canada)	RW	2011–2014	60	13	21	34	16	24	10	4	14	37	
Bourgealt, Leo	(Canada)	D	1932–1935	67	5	4	9	19	4	0	0	0	0	
Bownass, Jack	(Canada)	D	1957–1958	4	0	1	1	0	—	—	—	—	—	
Brashear, Donald	(United States)	LW	1993–1997	111	3	7	10	358	8	0	0	2		
Brisebois, Patrice	(Canada)	D	1990–2004; 2007–2009	896	87	284	371	546	89	9	22	31	70	
Brisson, Gerry	(Canada)	RW	1962–1963	4	0	2	2	4	—	—	—	—	—	
Broden, Connie	(Canada)	C	1955–1958	6	2	1	3	2	7	0	1	1	0	
Brooks, Adam	(Canada)	C	2021–2022	4	0	1	1	0	—	—	—	—	—	
Brown, Brad	(Canada)	D	1996–1997; 1998–1999	13	0	0	0	43	—	—	—	—	—	
Brown, George	(Canada)	C	1936–1939	79	6	22	28	34	7	0	0	0	0	
Brown, Mike	(United States)	RW	2015–2016	14	1	1	2	27	—	—	—	—	—	
Brubaker, Jeff	(Canada)	LW	1981–1982	3	0	1	1	32	2	0	0	0	27	
Brunet, Benoit	(Canada)	LW	1988–1989; 1990–2002	494	92	149	241	221	42	5	17	22	32	
Bucyk, Randy	(Canada)	C	1985–1986	17	4	2	6	8	2	0	0	0	0	
Bulis, Jan	(Czech Republic)	C	2000–2006	292	58	76	134	118	23	2	2	4	12	
Burchell, Fred	(Canada)	C	1950–1951; 1953–1954	4	0	0	0	2	—	—	—	—	—	
Bure, Valeri	(Russia)	RW	1994–1998	215	46	64	110	73	11	0	2	2	8	
Bureau, Marc	(Canada)	C	1995–1998	182	22	22	44	74	16	2	3	5	10	
Burke, Marty	(Canada)	D	1927–1934; 1937–1938	303	14	38	52	385	25	1	4	5	38	
Buswell, Walter	(Canada)	D	1935–1940	228	6	31	37	108	11	2	0	2	4	
Byron, Paul	(Canada)	C	2015–2022	383	81	79	160	98	38	5	6	11	16	
Cain, Herb	(Canada)	LW	1938–1939	45	13	14	27	26	3	0	0	0	2	
Cameron, Billy	(Canada)	RW	1923–1924	18	0	0	0	2	2	0	0	0	0	
Cameron, Harry	(Canada)	D	1919–1920	16	12	5	17	36	—	—	—	—	—	
Cammalleri, Michael	(Canada)	C	2009–2012	170	54	65	119	59	26	16	13	29	6	
Campbell, Dave	(Canada)	D	1920–1921	2	0	0	0	0	—	—	—	—	—	
Campbell, Jim	(United States)	RW	2000–2001	57	9	11	20	53	—	—	—	—	—	
Campbeau, Tod	(Canada)	C	1943–1944; 1947–1949	42	5	9	14	16	1	0	0	0	0	
Campedelli, Dominic	(United States)	D	1985–1986	2	0	0	0	0	—	—	—	—	—	
Carbonneau, Guy	(Canada)	C	1980–1981; 1982–1994	912	221	326	547	623	161	30	43	73	125	
Carle, Mathieu	(Canada)	D	2009–2010	3	0	0	0	4	—	—	—	—	—	
Carlson, Kent	(United States)	D	1983–1986	85	4	8	12	106	—	—	—	—	—	
Carnback, Patrik	(Sweden)	RW	1992–1993	6	0	0	0	2	—	—	—	—	—	
Caron, Alain	(Canada)	RW	1968–1969	2	0	0	0	0	—	—	—	—	—	
Carr, Daniel	(Canada)	LW	2015–2018	94	14	20	34	22	—	—	—	—	—	
Carrier, Alexandre	(Canada)	D	2024–2025	51	2	16	18	28	5	1	1	2	0	
Carse, Bob	(Canada)	LW	1947–1948	22	3	3	6	16	—	—	—	—	—	
Carson, Gerry	(Canada)	D	1928–1930; 1932–1935	205	11	8	19	172	12	0	0	0	8	
Carter, Billy	(Canada)	C	1957–1958; 1961–1962	8	0	0	0	4	—	—	—	—	—	
Carveth, Joe	(Canada)	RW	1947–1950	106	17	33	50	16	7	0	1	1	8	
Cassels, Andrew	(Canada)	C	1989–1991	60	8	19	27	22	8	0	2	2	2	
Caufield, Cole	(United States)	RW	2020–2025	287	118	101	219	44	25	7	9	16	0	
Chabot, John	(Canada)	C	1983–1985	66	19	31	50	15	11	1	4	5	0	
Chamberlain, Erwin	(Canada)	LW	1940–1942; 1943–1949	323	66	97	163	540	42	11	11	22	78	
Chaput, Michael	(Canada)	C	2018–2019	32	0	5	5	14	—	—	—	—	—	
Charbonneau, Jose	(Canada)	RW	1987–1989	25	1	5	6	12	8	0	0	0	4	
Charron, Eric	(Canada)	D	1992–1993	3	0	0	0	2	—	—	—	—	—	
Charron, Guy	(Canada)	C	1969–1971	20	2	2	4	2	—	—	—	—	—	
Chartraw, Rick	(United States)	D	1974–1981	281	18	37	55	222	51	7	4	11	51	
Chelios, Chris	(United States)	D	1983–1990	402	72	237	309	783	98	16	52	68	186	
Chiarot, Ben	(Canada)	D	2019–2022	164	17	29	46	153	32	1	3	4	28	
Chipchura, Kyle	(Canada)	RW	2007–2010	68	4	10	14	31	—	—	—	—	—	
Chorske, Tom	(United States)	RW	1989–1991	71	12	12	24	34	—	—	—	—	—	
Chouinard, Eric	(United States)	C	2000–2001	13	1	3	4	0	—	—	—	—	—	
Ciccone, Enrico	(Canada)	D	2000–2001	3	0	0	0	14	—	—	—	—	—	
Clague, Kale	(Canada)	D	2021–2022	25	2	3	5	18	—	—	—	—	—	
Clark, Brett	(Canada)	D	1997–1999	102	3	2	5	36	—	—	—	—	—	
Cleghorn, Odie	(Canada)	RW	1918–1925	159	93	33	126	134	11	7	2	9	5	
Cleghorn, Sprague	(Canada)	D	1921–1925	98	42	31	73	248	5	1	2	3	9	
Clune, Wally	(Canada)	D	1955–1956	5	0	0	0	6	—	—	—	—	—	
Collings, Norman	(Canada)	LW	1934–1935	1	0	1	1	0	—	—	—	—	—	
Collins, Bill	(Canada)	RW	1970–1971	40	6	2	8	39	—	—	—	—	—	
Comeau, Rey	(Canada)	C	1971–1972	4	0	0	0	0	—	—	—	—	—	
Condotta, Lucas	(Canada)	F	2022–2025	11	2	0	2	0	—	—	—	—	—	
Connelly, Wayne	(Canada)	C	1960–1961	3	0	0	0	0	—	—	—	—	—	
Connor, Cam	(Canada)	RW	1978–1979	23	1	3	4	39	8	1	0	1	0	
Conroy, Craig	(United States)	C	1994–1996	13	1	0	1	2	—	—	—	—	—	
Cooper, Carson	(Canada)	RW	1926–1927	14	9	3	12	16	3	0	0	0	0	
Corbeau, Bert	(Canada)	D	1917–1922	106	35	26	61	269	7	2	2	4	28	
Cormier, Roger	(Canada)	RW	1925–1926	1	0	0	0	0	—	—	—	—	—	
Corriveau, Andre	(Canada)	RW	1953–1954	3	0	1	1	0	—	—	—	—	—	
Corson, Shayne	(Canada)	LW	1985–1992; 1996–2000	662	168	255	423	1341	90	28	35	63	208	
Cote, Alain	(Canada)	D	1990–1992	41	0	9	9	48	11	0	2	2	26	
Cote, Jean-Philippe	(Canada)	D	2005–2006	8	0	0	0	4	—	—	—	—	—	
Coughlin, John	(Canada)	RW	1919–1920	3	0	0	0	0	—	—	—	—	—	
Cournoyer, Yvan	(Canada)	RW	1963–1979	968	428	435	863	255	147	64	63	127	47	
Courtnall, Russ	(Canada)	RW	1988–1992	250	82	113	195	77	55	22	10	32	39	
Cousins, Nick	(Canada)	C	2019–2020	58	9	13	22	33	—	—	—	—	—	
Coutu, Billy	(Canada)	D	1917–1920; 1921–1926	180	24	16	40	348	12	0	1	1	35	
Couture, Gerry	(Canada)	RW	1951–1952	10	0	1	1	4	—	—	—	—	—	
Couture, Rosario	(Canada)	RW	1935–1936	10	0	1	1	0	—	—	—	—	—	
Cressman, Glen	(Canada)	C	1956–1957	4	0	0	0	2	—	—	—	—	—	
Cristofli, Ed	(Canada)	RW	1989–1990	9	0	1	1	4	—	—	—	—	—	
Crutchfield, Nels	(Canada)	C	1934–1935	41	5	5	10	20	2	0	1	1	22	
Cullimore, Jassen	(Canada)	D	1996–1998	52	2	6	8	46	2	0	0	0	2	
Cummins, Jim	(United States)	RW	1999–2000	47	3	5	8	92	—	—	—	—	—	
Currie, Hugh	(Canada)	D	1950–1951	1	0	0	0	0	—	—	—	—	—	
Curry, Floyd	(Canada)	RW	1947–1958	601	105	99	204	147	91	23	17	40	38	
Curtis, Paul	(Canada)	D	1969–1970	1	0	0	0	0	—	—	—	—	—	
Cushenan, Ian	(Canada)	D	1958–1959	35	1	2	3	28	—	—	—	—	—	
Czerkawski, Mariusz	(Poland)	RW	2002–2003	43	5	9	14	16	—	—	—	—	—	
D'Agostini, Matt	(Canada)	RW	2007–2010	54	12	9	21	18	3	0	0	0	0	
Dach, Kirby	(Canada)	C	2022–2025	117	24	38	62	83	—	—	—	—	—	
Dackell, Andreas	(Sweden)	RW	2001–2004	212	26	44	70	58	12	1	2	3	6	
Dadonov, Evgenii	(Russia)	RW	2022–2023	50	4	14	18	16	—	—	—	—	—	
Dagenais, Pierre	(Canada)	RW	2003–2006	82	22	17	39	40	8	0	1	1	6	
Dahlin, Kjell	(Sweden)	C	1985–1988	166	57	59	116	10	35	6	11	17	6	
Daigneault, J. J.	(Canada)	D	1989–1996	352	22	68	90	257	52	1	8	9	40	
Dame, Napoleon Bunny	(Canada)	LW	1941–1942	34	2	5	7	4	—	—	—	—	—	
Damphousse, Vincent	(Canada)	C	1992–1999	519	184	314	498	559	48	19	24	43	48	
Danault, Phillip	(Canada)	LW	2015–2021	360	54	140	194	172	38	2	7	9	14	
Dandenault, Mathieu	(Canada)	D	2005–2009	252	20	34	54	174	19	0	3	3	6	
Darche, Mathieu	(Canada)	LW	2009–2012	149	22	26	48	32	18	1	2	3	2	
Daoust, Dan	(Canada)	C	1982–1983	4	0	1	1	4	—	—	—	—	—	
Darby, Craig	(United States)	C	1994–1995; 1999–2002	166	19	28	47	30	—	—	—	—	—	
Dauphin, Laurent	(Canada)	C	2021–2022	38	4	8	12	25	—	—	—	—	—	
Davidson, Brandon	(Canada)	D	2016–2017	23	0	3	3	13	3	0	0	0	0	
Davis, Lorne	(Canada)	RW	1951–1954	40	7	5	12	4	18	3	1	4	10	
Dawe, Jason	(Canada)	RW	1998–1999	37	4	5	9	14	—	—	—	—	—	
Dawes, Bob	(Canada)	D	1950–1951	15	0	5	5	4	1	0	0	0	0	
DeBlois, Lucien	(Canada)	C	1984–1986	112	26	28	54	68	19	2	4	6	11	
De la Rose, Jacob	(Sweden)	LW	2014–2018	119	8	11	19	51	12	0	0	0	4	
Delisle, Jonathan	(Canada)	RW	1998–1999	1	0	0	0	0	—	—	—	—	—	
Delisle, Xavier	(Canada)	C	2000–2001	14	3	2	5	6	—	—	—	—	—	
Delorme, Gilbert	(Canada)	D	1981–1984	165	17	36	53	152	3	0	0	0	2	
Demers, Tony	(Canada)	RW	1937–1938; 1939–1943	82	20	22	42	23	2	0	0	0	0	
Demidov, Ivan	(Russia)	RW	2024–2025	2	1	1	2	0	5	0	2	2	0	
Denis, Louis	(Canada)	RW	1949–1951	3	0	1	1	0	—	—	—	—	—	
Desaulniers, Gerry	(Canada)	C	1950–1951; 1952–1954	8	0	2	2	4	—	—	—	—	—	
Descoteaux, Matthieu	(Canada)	D	2000–2001	5	1	1	2	4	—	—	—	—	—	
Desharnais, David	(Canada)	C	2009–2017	435	79	171	250	136	38	3	10	13	14	
Desilets, Joffre	(Canada)	RW	1935–1938	118	20	25	45	23	7	1	0	1	7	
Desjardins, Eric	(Canada)	D	1988–1995	405	43	136	179	351	71	9	20	29	55	
Desjardins, Martin	(Canada)	C	1989–1990	8	0	2	2	2	—	—	—	—	—	
Deslauriers, Jacques	(Canada)	D	1955–1956	2	0	0	0	0	—	—	—	—	—	
Deslauriers, Nicolas	(Canada)	LW	2017–2019	106	12	7	19	77	—	—	—	—	—	
Dheere, Marcel	(Canada)	LW	1942–1943	11	1	2	3	2	5	0	0	0	6	
Dietz, Darren	(Canada)	D	2015–2016	13	1	4	5	13	—	—	—	—	—	
Diduck, Gerald	(Canada)	D	1990–1991	32	1	2	3	39	—	—	—	—	—	
Dionne, Gilbert	(Canada)	LW	1990–1995	196	60	70	130	106	36	10	12	22	30	
Dirk, Robert	(Canada)	D	1995–1996	3	0	0	0	6	—	—	—	—	—	
DiPietro, Paul	(Canada)	C	1991–1995	154	25	44	69	80	24	10	9	19	10	
Doherty, Fred	(Canada)	RW	1918–1919	1	0	0	0	0	—	—	—	—	—	
Domi, Max	(Canada)	LW	2018–2020	153	45	71	116	115	10	0	3	3	8	
Doran, John	(Canada)	D	1939–1940	6	0	3	3	6	—	—	—	—	—	
Dorohoy, Ed	(Canada)	C	1948–1949	16	0	0	0	6	—	—	—	—	—	
Dowd, Jim	(United States)	C	2003–2004	14	3	2	5	6	11	0	2	2	2	
Downey, Aaron	(Canada)	RW	2005–2007	46	2	4	6	98	1	0	0	0	0	
Drewiske, Davis	(United States)	D	2012-2013	9	1	2	3	0	0	—	—	—	—	
Drillon, Gordie	(Canada)	RW	1942–1943	49	28	22	50	14	5	4	2	6	0	
Drouin, Jonathan	(Canada)	C	2017–2023	321	48	138	186	131	10	1	6	7	8	
Drouin, Jude	(Canada)	C	1968–1970	12	0	1	1	2	—	—	—	—	—	
Drouin, Polly	(Canada)	LW	1934–1941	160	23	50	73	80	5	0	1	1	5	
Dube, Gilles	(Canada)	LW	1949–1950	12	1	2	3	2	—	—	—	—	—	
Duff, Dick	(Canada)	LW	1964–1970	305	87	85	172	166	60	16	26	42	38	
Dufresne, Donald	(Canada)	D	1988–1993	119	3	20	23	155	28	1	3	4	43	
Dupont, Norm	(Canada)	LW	1979–1980	35	1	3	4	4	8	1	1	2	0	
Dussault, Norm	(United States)	C	1947–1951	206	31	62	93	47	7	3	1	4	0	
Dvorak, Christian	(United States)	C	2021–2025	232	38	65	103	50	5	2	0	2	4	
Dwyer, Gordie	(Canada)	LW	2002–2004	13	0	0	0	53	—	—	—	—	—	
Dykhuis, Karl	(Canada)	D	1999–2004	288	21	32	53	152	12	1	1	2	8	
Eddolls, Frank	(Canada)	D	1944–1947	57	5	9	14	26	18	0	1	1	6	
Edmundson, Garry	(Canada)	LW	1951–1952	1	0	0	0	2	—	—	—	—	—	
Edmundson, Joel	(Canada)	D	2020–2023	140	8	24	32	118	22	0	6	6	10	
Eller, Lars	(Denmark)	C	2010–2016	435	71	83	154	297	37	6	12	18	26	
Ellis, Morgan	(Canada)	D	2015–2016	3	0	0	0	2	—	—	—	—	—	
Emberg, Eddie	(Canada)	C	1944–1945	—	—	—	—	—	2	1	0	1	0	
Emelin, Alexei	(Russia)	D	2011–2017	380	14	58	72	323	29	1	4	5	16	
Engblom, Brian	(Canada)	D	1976–1982	316	14	87	101	298	41	3	7	10	39	
Evans, Jake	(Canada)	C/RW	2019–2025	350	40	88	128	113	18	1	3	4	6	
Evans, Stewart	(Canada)	D	1938–1939	43	2	7	9	58	3	0	0	0	2	
Ewen, Todd	(Canada)	RW	1989–1993	190	13	19	32	609	14	0	0	0	22	
Farnham, Bobby	(United States)	LW	2016–2017	3	0	0	0	17	—	—	—	—	—	
Farrell, Sean	(United States)	C	2022–2023	6	1	0	1	0	—	—	—	—	—	
Ferguson, Craig	(United States)	C	1993–1996	13	1	1	2	2	—	—	—	—	—	
Ferguson, John	(Canada)	LW	1963–1971	500	145	158	303	1214	85	20	18	38	260	
Ferland, Jonathan	(Canada)	RW	2005–2006	7	1	0	1	2	—	—	—	—	—	
Field, Wilf	(Canada)	D	1944–1945	9	1	0	1	10	—	—	—	—	—	
Fillion, Bob	(Canada)	LW	1943–1950	327	42	61	103	84	33	7	4	11	10	
Fitzpatrick, Rory	(United States)	D	1995–1997	48	0	3	3	24	6	1	1	2	0	
Fleischmann, Tomas	(Czech Republic)	LW	2015–2016	57	10	10	20	28	—	—	—	—	—	
Fleming, Gerry	(Canada)	LW	1993–1995	11	0	0	0	42	—	—	—	—	—	
Fleming, Reg	(Canada)	D	1959–1960	3	0	0	0	2	—	—	—	—	—	
Fletcher, Steven	(Canada)	D	1987–1988	—	—	—	—	—	1	0	0	0	5	
Fleury, Cale	(Canada)	D	2019–2020	41	1	0	1	6	—	—	—	—	—	
Flockhart, Ron	(Canada)	C	1984–1985	42	10	12	22	14	2	1	1	2	2	
Flynn, Brian	(Canada)	RW	2014–2017	116	10	10	20	10	7	1	2	3	0	
Fogarty, Bryan	(Canada)	D	1993–1995	34	6	4	10	44	—	—	—	—	—	
Folin, Christian	(Sweden)	D	2018–2020	35	1	5	6	24	—	—	—	—	—	
Fontinato, Lou	(Canada)	D	1961–1963	117	4	21	25	308	6	0	1	1	23	
Frampton, Bob	(Canada)	LW	1949–1950	2	0	0	0	0	3	0	0	0	0	
Fraser, Gord	(Canada)	D	1929–1930	10	0	0	0	4	—	—	—	—	—	
Fraser, Scott	(Canada)	RW	1995–1996	14	2	0	2	4	—	—	—	—	—	
Frew, Irv	(Canada)	D	1935–1936	18	0	2	2	16	—	—	—	—	—	
Froese, Byron	(Canada)	C	2017–2018	48	3	8	11	26	—	—	—	—	—	
Frolik, Michael	(Czech Republic)	LW	2020–2021	8	0	0	0	0	—	—	—	—	—	
Fryday, Bob	(Canada)	RW	1949–1950; 1951–1952	5	1	0	1	0	—	—	—	—	—	
Gagne, Art	(Canada)	RW	1926–1929	132	41	16	57	169	9	1	1	2	16	
Gagnon, Germain	(Canada)	LW	1971–1972	4	0	0	0	0	—	—	—	—	—	
Gagnon, Johnny	(Canada)	RW	1930–1940	406	115	137	252	286	31	11	12	23	37	
Gainey, Bob	(Canada)	LW	1973–1989	1160	239	262	501	585	182	25	48	73	151	
Galchenyuk, Alex	(United States)	C	2012–2018	418	108	147	255	151	28	4	9	13	16	
Gallagher, Brendan	(Canada)	RW	2010–2025	834	239	225	464	555	76	13	20	33	25	
Gamble, Dick	(Canada)	LW	1950–1956	178	38	41	79	60	14	1	2	3	4	
Ganchar, Perry	(Canada)	RW	1987–1988	1	1	0	1	0	—	—	—	—	—	
Gardiner, Herb	(Canada)	D	1926–1929	95	10	9	19	52	9	0	1	1	16	
Gardner, Dave	(Canada)	C	1972–1974	36	2	11	13	2	—	—	—	—	—	
Gaudreault, Leo	(Canada)	LW	1927–1929; 1932–1933	67	8	4	12	30	—	—	—	—	—	
Gauthier, Art	(Canada)	C	1926–1927	13	0	0	0	0	1	0	0	0	0	
Gauthier, Fern	(Canada)	RW	1944–1945	50	18	13	31	23	4	0	0	0	0	
Gauthier, Jean	(Canada)	D	1960–1967; 1969–1970	90	1	20	21	68	7	0	0	0	16	
Gauthier, Luc	(Canada)	D	1990–1991	3	0	0	0	2	—	—	—	—	—	
Gauvreau, Jocelyn	(Canada)	D	1983–1984	2	0	0	0	0	—	—	—	—	—	
Gendron, Guy	(Canada)	LW	1960–1961	53	9	12	21	51	5	0	0	0	2	
Geoffrion, Bernie	(Canada)	RW	1950–1964	766	371	388	759	636	127	56	59	115	88	
Geoffrion, Dan	(Canada)	RW	1979–1980	32	0	6	6	12	2	0	0	0	7	
Getliffe, Ray	(Canada)	C	1939–1945	265	99	97	196	193	26	6	7	13	24	
Gignac, Brandon	(Canada)	C	2023–2024	7	1	0	1	0	—	—	—	—	—	
Gilbert, Tom	(United States)	D	2014–2016	56	2	2	4	22	—	—	—	—	—	
Gilchrist, Brent	(Canada)	LW	1988–1992	236	46	67	113	111	41	10	8	18	24	
Gill, Hal	(United States)	D	2009–2012	196	5	23	28	140	25	0	1	1	22	
Gilmour, Doug	(Canada)	C	2001–2003	131	21	50	71	84	12	4	6	10	16	
Gingras, Gaston	(Canada)	D	1979–1983; 1985–1988	247	34	102	136	111	32	4	12	16	12	
Gionta, Brian	(United States)	RW	2009–2014	303	97	76	173	96	45	13	15	28	16	
Giroux, Art	(Canada)	RW	1932–1933	40	5	2	7	14	2	0	0	0	0	
Glover, Howie	(Canada)	RW	1968–1969	1	0	0	0	0	—	—	—	—	—	
Godin, Sammy	(Canada)	RW	1933–1934	36	2	2	4	15	—	—	—	—	—	
Goldsworthy, Leroy	(United States)	RW	1934–1936	80	35	20	55	21	2	1	0	1	0	
Goldup, Glenn	(Canada)	RW	1973–1976	18	0	1	1	4	—	—	—	—	—	
Gomez, Scott	(United States)	C	2009–2012	196	21	87	108	122	26	2	16	18	27	
Gorges, Josh	(Canada)	D	2006–2014	560	14	84	98	249	68	0	9	9		
Goupille, Cliff	(Canada)	D	1935–1943	222	12	28	40	256	8	2	0	2	6	
Goyette, Phil	(Canada)	C	1956–1963	375	62	120	182	44	52	12	14	26	14	
Graboski, Tony	(Canada)	Lw	1940–1943	66	6	10	16	24	3	0	0	0	6	
Grabovski, Mikhail	(Belarus)	C	2006–2008	27	3	6	9	8	—	—	—	—	—	
Gracie, Bob	(Canada)	C	1938–1939	7	0	1	1	4	—	—	—	—	—	
Grant, Danny	(Canada)	LW	1965–1966; 1967–1968	23	3	4	7	10	10	0	3	3	5	
Gratton, Benoit	(Canada)	C	2001–2002; 2003–2004	12	1	1	2	12	—	—	—	—	—	
Gravelle, Leo	(Canada)	RW	1946–1951	205	43	32	75	36	17	4	1	5	2	
Gray, Terry	(Canada)	RW	1963–1964	4	0	0	0	6	—	—	—	—	—	
Green, Rick	(Canada)	D	1982–1989	399	10	79	89	183	97	3	16	19	73	
Grenier, Lucien	(Canada)	RW	1968–1970	23	2	3	5	2	2	0	0	0	0	
Groleau, Francois	(Canada)	D	1995–1998	8	0	1	1	6	—	—	—	—	—	
Grosvenor, Leonard	(Canada)	C	1932–1933	4	0	0	0	0	2	0	0	0	0	
Guhle, Kaiden	(Canada)	D	2022–2025	169	16	42	58	130	5	0	0	0	4	
Guren, Miloslav	(Czech Republic)	D	1998–2000	36	1	3	4	16	—	—	—	—	—	
Gurianov, Denis	(Russia)	RW	2022–2023	23	5	3	8	6	—	—	—	—	—	
Gustafsson, Erik	(Sweden)	D	2020–2021	5	0	2	2	0	16	1	2	3	0	
Haggerty, Jim	(Canada)	LW	1941–1942	5	1	1	2	0	3	2	1	3	0	
Hainsey, Ron	(United States)	D	2002–2004	32	1	1	2	6	—	—	—	—	—	
Hall, Joe	(Canada)	D	1917–1919	38	15	8	23	189	7	0	1	1	38	
Haller, Kevin	(Canada)	D	1991–1994	149	17	25	42	252	33	2	7	9	41	
Hamel, Jean	(Canada)	D	1983–1984	79	1	12	13	92	15	0	2	2	16	
Hamilton, Chuck	(Canada)	LW	1961–1962	1	0	0	0	0	—	—	—	—	—	
Hamrlik, Roman	(Czech Republic)	D	2007–2011	158	11	48	59	100	12	1	2	3	8	
Hanley, Joel	(Canada)	D	2015–2017	17	0	6	6	4	—	—	—	—	—	
Hanna, John	(Canada)	D	1963–1964	6	0	0	0	2	—	—	—	—	—	
Harmon, Glen	(Canada)	D	1942–1951	452	50	96	146	334	53	5	10	15	37	
Harper, Terry	(Canada)	D	1962–1972	554	14	112	126	805	94	4	12	16	116	
Harrington, Hago	(United States)	LW	1932–1933	24	1	1	2	2	2	1	0	1	2	
Harris, Jordan	(United States)	D	2021–2024	131	8	24	32	56	—	—	—	—	—	
Harris, Ted	(Canada)	D	1963–1970	407	18	95	113	576	60	1	12	13	158	
Hart, Gizzy	(Canada)	LW	1926–1928; 1932–1933	102	6	8	14	12	8	0	1	1	0	
Harvey, Doug	(Canada)	D	1947–1961	890	76	371	447	1042	123	8	59	67	138	
Harvey-Pinard, Rafael	(Canada)	LW	2021–2025	84	17	14	31	16	—	—	—	—	—	
Haynes, Paul	(Canada)	C	1935–1941	220	33	100	133	120	11	2	7	9	9	
Headley, Fern	(United States)	D	1924–1925	17	0	1	1	6	1	0	0	0	0	
Heffernan, Gerald	(Canada)	RW	1941–1944	83	33	35	68	27	11	3	3	6	8	
Heineman, Emil	(Sweden)	LW	2023–2025	66	10	8	18	20	5	1	0	1	0	
Hemsky, Ales	(Czech Republic)	RW	2017–2018	7	0	0	0	10	—	—	—	—	—	
Henry, Alex	(Canada)	D	2008–2009	2	0	0	0	10	—	—	—	—	—	
Heron, Red	(Canada)	C	1941–1942	12	1	1	2	12	3	0	0	0	0	
Hicke, Bill	(Canada)	RW	1958–1965	318	69	100	169	176	31	—3	6	9	35	
Hicks, Wayne	(United States)	RW	1963–1964	2	0	0	0	0	—	—	—	—	—	
Higgins, Chris	(United States)	RW	2003–2009	282	84	67	151	96	22	6	5	11	2	
Higgins, Matt	(Canada)	C	1997–2001	57	1	2	3	6	—	—	—	—	—	
Hill, Sean	(United States)	D	1990–1993	31	2	6	8	54	8	1	0	1	6	
Hiller, Wilbert	(Canada)	LW	1942–1943; 1944–1946	132	35	33	68	28	20	6	3	9	10	
Hillis, Cameron	(Canada)	C	2021–2022	1	0	0	0	0	—	—	—	—	—	
Hillman, Larry	(Canada)	D	1968–1969	25	0	5	5	17	1	0	0	0	0	
Hirschfeld, Bert	(Canada)	LW	1949–1951	33	1	4	5	2	5	1	0	1	0	
Hoekstra, Cecil	(Canada)	C	1959–1960	4	0	0	0	0	—	—	—	—	—	
Hoffman, Mike	(Canada)	LW	2021–2023	134	29	40	69	60	—	—	—	—	—	
Hoganson, Dale	(Canada)	D	1971–1973	46	0	2	2	4	—	—	—	—	—	
Hoglund, Jonas	(Sweden)	RW	1997–1999	102	14	15	29	22	10	2	0	2	0	
Holloway, Bud	(Canada)	LW	2015–2016	1	0	0	0	0	—	—	—	—	—	
Holmes, Bill	(Canada)	C	1925–1926	9	1	0	1	2	—	—	—	—	—	
Horvath, Bronco	(Canada)	C	1956–1957	1	0	0	0	0	—	—	—	—	—	
Hossa, Marcel	(Slovakia)	LW	2001–2004	59	10	9	19	24	—	—	—	—	—	
Houde, Eric	(Canada)	C	1996–1999	30	2	3	5	4	—	—	—	—	—	
Houle, Rejean	(Canada)	LW	1969–1973; 1976–1983	635	161	247	408	395	90	14	34	48	66	
Huck, Fran	(Canada)	C	1969–1971	7	1	2	3	0	—	—	—	—	—	
Hudon, Charles	(Canada)	LW	2015–2020	125	14	27	41	56	2	0	0	0	0	
Hughes, Pat	(Canada)	RW	1977–1979	44	9	8	17	24	8	1	2	3	4	
Hunter, Mark	(Canada)	RW	1981–1985	196	53	35	88	381	30	2	4	6	102	
Hutson, Lane	(United States)	D	2023–2025	84	6	62	68	34	5	0	5	5	0	
Irwin, Ivan	(United States)	D	1952–1953	4	0	1	1	0	—	—	—	—	—	
Ivanans, Raitis	(Latvia)	LW	2005–2006	4	0	0	0	9	—	—	—	—	—	
Janik, Doug	(United States)	D	2008–2009	2	0	0	0	0	—	—	—	—	—	
Jarventie, Martti	(Finland)	D	2001–2002	1	0	0	0	0	—	—	—	—	—	
Jarvis, Doug	(Canada)	C	1975–1982	560	91	154	245	151	72	11	20	31	26	
Jenkins, Roger	(United States)	RW	1934–1935; 1936–1937	55	4	6	10	71	2	1	0	1	2	
Jerabek, Jakub	(Czech Republic)	D	2017–2018	25	1	3	4	6	—	—	—	—	—	
Joannette, Rosario	(Canada)	C	1944–1945	2	0	1	1	4	—	—	—	—	—	
Johns, Don	(Canada)	D	1965–1966	1	0	0	0	0	—	—	—	—	—	
Johnson, Al	(Canada)	RW	1956–1957	2	0	1	1	2	—	—	—	—	—	
Johnson, Mike	(Canada)	RW	2006–2007	80	11	20	31	40	—	—	—	—	—	
Johnson, Tom	(Canada)	D	1947–1948; 1949–1963	857	47	183	230	897	111	8	15	23	109	
Johnston, Ryan	(Canada)	D	2015–2017	10	0	0	0	4	—	—	—	—	—	
Joliat, Aurel	(Canada)	LW	1922–1938	655	270	190	460	771	46	9	13	22	66	
Joliat, Rene	(Canada)	RW	1924–1925	1	0	0	0	0	—	—	—	—	—	
Joly, Yvan	(Canada)	RW	1979–1981; 1982–1983	2	0	0	0	0	1	0	0	0	0	
Jomphe, Jean-François	(Canada)	C	1998–1999	6	0	0	0	0	—	—	—	—	—	
Juulsen, Noah	(Canada)	D	2017–2019	44	2	6	8	10	—	—	—	—	—	
Juneau, Joe	(Canada)	C	2001–2004	212	19	54	73	50	23	1	5	6	10	
Kaiser, Vern	(Canada)	LW	1950–1951	50	7	5	12	33	2	0	0	0	0	
Kapanen, Oliver	(Finland)	C	2024–2025	18	0	2	2	2	3	0	1	1	0	
Keane, Mike	(Canada)	RW	1988–1996	506	90	179	269	496	77	13	21	34	57	
Kilger, Chad	(Canada)	LW	2000–2004	214	28	40	68	96	12	0	1	1	9	
King, Dwight	(Canada)	LW	2016–2017	17	1	0	1	2	6	0	0	0	0	
King, Frank	(Canada)	C	1950–1951	10	1	0	1	2	—	—	—	—	—	
Kiprusoff, Marko	(Finland)	D	1995–1996	24	0	4	4	8	—	—	—	—	—	
Kitchen, Bill	(Canada)	D	1981–1984	12	0	0	0	13	3	0	1	1	0	
Kjellberg, Patric	(Sweden)	LW	1992–1993	7	0	0	0	0	—	—	—	—	—	
Koivu, Saku	(Finland)	C	1995–2009	792	191	450	641	623	54	16	32	48	40	
Komisarek, Mike	(United States)	D	2002–2009	361	12	46	58	496	29	1	2	3	56	
Kordic, John	(Canada)	RW	1985–1989	115	7	10	17	335	36	4	2	6	98	
Kostitysn, Andrei	(Belarus)	C	2005–2012	379	99	111	210	171	49	14	9	23	24	
Kostitysn, Sergei	(Belarus)	LW	2007–2010	155	24	44	68	123	18	3	5	8	16	155
Kostopoulos, Tom	(Canada)	RW	2007–2008	145	15	20	35	219	16	3	2	5	10	
Kotkaniemi, Jesperi	(Finland)	C	2018–2021	171	22	40	62	61	29	9	3	12	37	
Kovacevic, Johnathan	(Canada)	D	2022–2024	139	9	19	28	81	—	—	—	—	—	
Kovalchuk, Ilya	(Russia)	LW	2019–2020	22	6	7	13	2	—	—	—	—	—	
Kovalenko, Andrei	(Russia)	RW	1995–1996	51	17	17	34	33	6	0	0	0	6	
Kovalev, Alexei	(Russia)	RW	2003–2009	314	103	161	264	310	33	17	14	31	16	
Kulak, Brett	(Canada)	D	2018–2022	215	11	34	45	96	23	0	4	4	4	
Kurvers, Tom	(United States)	D	1984–1987	138	17	58	75	66	12	0	6	6	6	
Lach, Elmer	(Canada)	C	1940–1954	664	215	408	623	478	76	19	45	64	36	
Lachance, Scott	(United States)	D	1998–2000	74	1	7	8	33	—	—	—	—	—	
Laflamme, Christian	(Canada)	D	1999–2001	54	0	5	5	50	—	—	—	—	—	
Lafleur, Guy	(Canada)	RW	1971–1985	961	518	728	1246	381	124	57	76	133	67	
Lafleur, Rene	(Canada)	LW	1924–1925	1	0	0	0	0	—	—	—	—	—	
Laforce, Ernie	(Canada)	D	1942–1943	1	0	0	0	0	—	—	—	—	—	
LaForge, Claude	(Canada)	LW	1957–1958	5	0	0	0	0	—	—	—	—	—	
LaFrance, Del	(Canada)	LW	1933–1934	3	0	0	0	2	2	0	0	0	0	
Lafrance, Leo	(Canada)	LW	1926–1928	19	1	0	1	2	—	—	—	—	—	
Lagesson, William	(Sweden)	D	2021–2022	3	0	1	1	0	—	—	—	—	—	
Laine, Patrik	(Finland)	RW	2024–2025	52	20	13	33	14	2	0	1	1	2	
Lalonde, Newsy	(Canada)	C	1917–1922	98	124	41	165	181	7	15	4	19	32	
Lalor, Mike	(United States)	D	1985–1989	197	5	29	34	231	41	3	3	6	69	
Lamb, Joe	(Canada)	RW	1934–1935	7	3	2	5	4	—	—	—	—	—	
Lamb, Mark	(Canada)	C	1994–1996	40	1	0	1	18	—	—	—	—	—	
Lambert, Yvon	(Canada)	LW	1972–1981	606	181	234	415	302	86	24	22	46	65	
Lamirande, Jean	(Canada)	LW	1954–1955	1	0	0	0	0	—	—	—	—	—	
Lamoureux, Leo	(Canada)	C	1941–1947	235	19	79	98	175	28	1	6	7	16	
Landon, Larry	(Canada)	LW	1983–1984	2	0	0	0	0	—	—	—	—	—	
Landry, Eric	(Canada)	C	2000–2002	53	4	8	12	43	—	—	—	—	—	
Lang, Robert	(Czech Republic)	C	2008–2009	50	18	21	39	36	—	—	—	—	—	
Langdon, Darren	(Canada)	LW	2003–2004	64	0	3	3	135	9	1	0	1	6	
Langlois, Al	(Canada)	D	1957–1961	177	2	29	31	130	27	0	4	4	32	
Langlois, Charlie	(Canada)	RW	1927–1928	32	0	0	0	14	2	0	0	0	0	
Langway, Rod	(United States)	D	1978–1982	268	26	101	127	347	26	3	6	9	42	
Laperriere, Jacques	(Canada)	D	1962–1974	691	40	242	282	674	88	9	22	31	101	
Lapierre, Maxime	(Canada)	C	2005–2011	179	28	30	58	160	16	0	3	3	32	
Lapointe, Guy	(Canada)	D	1968–1982	777	166	406	572	812	112	25	43	68	121	
Laraque, Georges	(Canada)	LW	2008–2010	33	0	2	2	61	4	0	0	0	4	
Larochelle, Wildor	(Canada)	RW	1925–1936	404	81	63	144	197	32	6	4	10	24	
Larose, Claude	(Canada)	RW	1962–1968; 1970–1975	529	117	123	240	544	82	11	16	27	118	
Larouche, Pierre	(Canada)	C	1977–1982	236	110	126	236	59	22	4	13	17	6	
Latendresse, Guillaume	(Canada)	RW	2006–2010	232	48	37	85	137	12	0	1	1	31	
Laughlin, Craig	(Canada)	RW	1981–1982	36	12	11	23	33	3	0	1	1	0	
Laviolette, Jack	(Canada)	D	1917–1918	18	2	1	3	6	2	0	0	0	0	
Laycoe, Hal	(Canada)	D	1947–1951	133	4	11	15	81	9	0	1	1	13	
Lebeau, Patrick	(Canada)	LW	1990–1991	2	1	1	2	0	—	—	—	—	—	
Lebeau, Stephan	(Canada)	C	1988–1994	313	104	139	243	79	30	9	7	16	12	
LeClair, Jack	(Canada)	C	1954–1957	160	20	40	60	56	20	6	1	7	6	
LeClair, John	(United States)	LW	1990–1995	224	49	69	118	91	38	7	8	15	26	
Leduc, Albert	(Canada)	D	1925–1933; 1934–1935	341	56	32	88	574	28	5	6	11	32	
Lee, Bobby	(Canada)	C	1942–1943	1	0	0	0	0	—	—	—	—	—	
Leeman, Gary	(Canada)	RW	1992–1994	51	10	23	33	31	12	1	2	3	2	
Lefebvre, Sylvain	(Canada)	D	1989–1992	200	11	42	53	182	19	1	0	1	10	
Lefley, Charles	(Canada)	RW	1970–1975	174	45	60	105	60	24	3	6	9	6	
Leger, Roger	(Canada)	D	1946–1950	180	17	51	68	69	20	0	7	7	14	
Lehkonen, Artturi	(Finland)	LW	2016–2022	396	74	75	149	104	33	6	6	12	14	
Lemaire, Jacques	(Canada)	C	1967–1979	853	366	469	835	217	145	61	78	139	63	
Lemieux, Claude	(Canada)	RW	1983–1990	281	97	92	189	576	77	22	22	44	225	
Lemieux, Jocelyn	(Canada)	RW	1988–1990	35	4	3	7	61	—	—	—	—	—	
Lepine, Alfred	(Canada)	C	1925–1938	526	143	98	241	392	41	7	5	12	26	
Lepine, Hector	(Canada)	C	1925–1926	33	5	2	7	2	—	—	—	—	—	
Lernout, Brett	(Canada)	D	2015–2018	21	0	1	1	6	—	—	—	—	—	
Leroux, Gaston	(Canada)	D	1935–1936	2	0	0	0	0	—	—	—	—	—	
Lesieur, Art	(United States)	D	1928–1929; 1930–1932; 1935–1936	98	4	2	6	50	14	0	0	0	4	
Leskinen, Otto	(Finland)	D	2019–2021	6	0	0	0	0	—	—	—	—	—	
Lessio, Lucas	(Canada)	LW	2015–2016	12	1	1	2	2	—	—	—	—	—	
Lewis, Doug	(Canada)	LW	1946–1947	3	0	0	0	0	—	—	—	—	—	
Lind, Juha	(Finland)	LW	1999–2001	60	4	6	10	8	—	—	—	—	—	
Linden, Trevor	(Canada)	C	1999–2001	107	25	38	63	86	—	—	—	—	—	
Lindsay, Bill	(Canada)	LW	2001–2003	32	1	5	6	46	11	2	2	4	2	
Lindström, Gustav	(Sweden)	D	2023–2024	14	3	1	4	6	—	—	—	—	—	
Ling, David	(Canada)	RW	1996–1998	3	0	0	0	0	—	—	—	—	—	
Litzenberger, Ed	(Canada)	C	1952–1955	34	8	4	12	14	—	—	—	—	—	
Locas, Jacques	(Canada)	RW	1947–1949	59	7	8	15	66	—	—	—	—	—	
Locke, Corey	(Canada)	C	2007–2008	1	0	0	0	0	—	—	—	—	—	
Long, Stan	(Canada)	D	1951–1952	—	—	—	—	—	3	0	0	0	0	
Lorrain, Rod	(Canada)	RW	1935–1940; 1941–1942	179	28	39	67	30	11	0	3	3	0	
Lowe, Ross	(Canada)	D	1950–1952	31	1	5	6	42	2	0	0	0	0	
Ludwig, Craig	(United States)	D	1982–1990	597	26	111	137	619	110	3	13	16	155	
Lumley, Dave	(Canada)	RW	1978–1979	3	0	0	0	0	—	—	—	—	—	
Lumme, Jyrki	(Finland)	D	1988–1990	75	2	22	24	51	—	—	—	—	—	
Lupien, Gilles	(Canada)	D	1977–1980	174	3	19	22	341	25	0	0	0	21	
Lynn, Vic	(Canada)	LW	1945–1946	2	0	0	0	0	—	—	—	—	—	
Macey, Hubert	(Canada)	LW	1946–1947	12	0	1	1	0	7	0	0	0	0	
MacKay, Calum	(Canada)	LW	1949–1955	231	50	55	105	214	38	5	13	18	20	
MacKay, Murdo	(Canada)	RW	1945–1949	19	0	3	3	0	15	1	2	3	0	
MacKenzie, Bill	(Canada)	D	1936–1938	50	4	3	7	26	5	1	0	1	0	
MacNeil, Al	(Canada)	D	1961–1962	61	1	7	8	74	5	0	0	0	2	
MacPherson, Bud	(Canada)	D	1948–1949; 1950–1955; 1956–1957	259	5	33	38	233	29	0	3	3	21	
Mahaffy, John	(Canada)	C	1942–1943; 1944–1945	9	2	5	7	4	1	0	1	1	0	
Mahovlich, Frank	(Canada)	LW	1970–1974	263	129	181	310	145	49	27	31	58	26	
Mahovlich, Peter	(Canada)	C	1969–1978	581	223	346	569	695	86	30	41	71	134	
Mailley, Frank	(Canada)	D	1942–1943	1	0	0	0	0	—	—	—	—	—	
Mailloux, Logan	(Canada)	D	2023–2025	8	2	3	5	6	—	—	—	—	—	
Majeau, Fern	(Canada)	C	1943–1945	56	22	24	46	43	1	0	0	0	0	
Malakhov, Vladimir	(Russia)	D	1994–2000	283	42	99	141	287	14	3	4	7	16	
Maley, David	(United States)	LW	1985–1987	51	6	12	18	55	7	1	3	4	2	
Malhotra, Manny	(Canada)	C	2014–2015	7	0	0	0	2	—	—	—	—	—	
Malone, Cliff	(Canada)	RW	1951–1952	3	0	0	0	0	—	—	—	—	—	
Malone, Joe	(Canada)	C	1917–1919; 1922–1924	58	52	6	58	35	9	6	2	8	6	
Manastersky, Tom	(Canada)	D	1950–1951	6	0	0	0	11	—	—	—	—	—	
Mancuso, Gus	(Canada)	RW	1937–1940	21	1	1	2	4	—	—	—	—	—	
Manson, Dave	(Canada)	D	1996–1999	101	5	33	38	193	15	0	1	1	31	
Mantha, Georges	(Canada)	D	1928–1941	488	89	102	191	148	36	6	2	8	24	
Mantha, Sylvio	(Canada)	D	1923–1936	538	63	78	141	669	39	5	5	10	64	
Mara, Paul	(United States)	D	2009–2011	62	0	12	12	96	1	0	0	0		
Markov, Andrei	(Russia)	D	2000–2017	990	119	453	572	505	89	5	27	32	56	
Marshall, Don	(Canada)	LW	1951–1952; 1954–1963	585	114	140	254	81	78	5	13	18	12	
Martinsen, Andreas	(Norway)	C	2016–2017	9	0	0	0	0	2	0	0	0	0	
Martinson, Steve	(United States)	LW	1988–1990	38	1	0	1	151	1	0	0	0	10	
Masnick, Paul	(Canada)	C	1950–1955	180	15	32	47	117	33	4	5	9	27	
Matheson, Mike	(Canada)	D	2022–2025	210	25	102	127	142	5	0	1	1	2	
Matte, Joe	(Canada)	D	1925–1926	6	0	0	0	0	—	—	—	—	—	
Matteau, Stefan	(United States)	LW	2015–2017	12	0	1	1	4	—	—	—	—	—	
Matz, Johnny	(United States)	C	1924–1925	30	2	3	5	0	1	0	0	0	0	
Maxwell, Ben	(Canada)	C	2008–2009	7	0	0	0	2	1	0	0	0	0	
Mazur, Eddie	(Canada)	D	1950–1955	92	8	19	27	116	25	4	5	9	22	
McAvoy, George	(Canada)	D	1954–1955	—	—	—	—	—	4	0	0	0	0	
McCaffrey, Bert	(Canada)	RW	1929–1931	50	3	4	7	36	6	1	1	2	6	
McCarron, Michael	(Canada)	RW	2015–2018	69	2	6	8	110	1	0	0	0	0	
McCartney, Walter	(Canada)	LW	1932–1933	2	0	0	0	0	—	—	—	—	—	
McCleary, Trent	(Canada)	C	1998–2000	58	1	0	1	33	—	—	—	—	—	
McCormack, John	(Canada)	C	1951–1954	164	8	29	37	25	16	0	1	1	0	
McCreary, Bill	(Canada)	LW	1962–1963	14	2	3	5	0	—	—	—	—	—	
McCreary, Keith	(Canada)	RW	1961–1962; 1964–1965	9	0	3	3	4	1	0	0	0	0	
McCully, Bob	(Canada)	RW	1934–1935	1	0	0	0	0	—	—	—	—	—	
McDonald, Ab	(Canada)	LW	1957–1960	137	22	36	58	61	13	1	1	2	8	
McDonald, Jack	(Canada)	LW	1917–1919; 1920–1922	35	17	6	23	21	7	1	3	4	3	
McGibbon, Irving	(Canada)	RW	1942–1943	1	0	0	0	2	—	—	—	—	—	
McGill, Jack	(Canada)	LW	1934–1937	134	27	10	37	71	3	2	0	2	0	
McKay, Randy	(Canada)	RW	2002–2003	75	6	13	19	72	—	—	—	—	—	
McKinnon, Johnny	(Canada)	D	1925–1926	2	0	0	0	0	—	—	—	—	—	
McMahon, Mike	(Canada)	D	1942–1944; 1945–1946	55	7	18	25	100	13	1	2	3	30	
McNabney, Sid	(Canada)	C	1950–1951	—	—	—	—	—	5	0	1	1	2	
McNamara, Howard	(Canada)	D	1919–1920	10	1	0	1	4	—	—	—	—	—	
McPhee, Mike	(Canada)	LW	1983–1992	581	162	162	324	581	125	26	26	52	191	
Meagher, Rick	(Canada)	C	1979–1980	2	0	0	0	0	—	—	—	—	—	
Meger, Paul	(Canada)	LW	1949–1955	212	39	52	91	118	35	3	8	11	16	
Meronek, William	(Canada)	C	1939–1940; 1942–1943	19	5	8	13	0	1	0	0	0	0	
Merrill, Jon	(United States)	D	2020–2021	13	0	0	0	4	13	0	0	0	0	
Mete, Victor	(Canada)	D	2017–2021	199	5	31	36	38	10	0	2	2	2	
Metropolit, Glen	(Canada)	C	2008–2010	80	18	14	32	37	20	0	4	4	6	
Mickey, Larry	(Canada)	RW	1969–1970	21	4	4	8	4	—	—	—	—	—	
Miller, Bill	(Canada)	C	1935–1937	65	4	3	7	14	5	0	0	0	0	
Milroy, Duncan	(Canada)	RW	2006–2007	5	0	1	1	0	—	—	—	—	—	
Mitchell, Torrey	(Canada)	C	2014–2017	174	19	18	37	99	15	2	4	6	6	
Moen, Travis	(Canada)	LW	2009–2014	328	27	42	69	279	40	2	2	4	25	
Momesso, Sergio	(Canada)	LW	1983–1984; 1985–1988	137	29	38	67	243	17	1	5	6	47	
Monahan, Garry	(Canada)	LW	1967–1969	14	0	0	0	8	—	—	—	—	—	
Monahan, Sean	(Canada)	C	2022–2024	74	19	33	52	26	—	—	—	—	—	
Mondou, Armand	(Canada)	LW	1928–1940	386	47	71	118	99	32	3	5	8	12	
Mondou, Pierre	(Canada)	C	1976–1985	548	194	262	456	179	69	17	28	45	26	
Montgomery, Jim	(Canada)	C	1994–1995	5	0	0	0	2	—	—	—	—	—	
Moore, Dickie	(Canada)	LW	1951–1963	654	254	340	594	575	112	38	56	94	101	
Moore, Dominic	(Canada)	LW	2009–2010	21	2	9	11	8	19	4	1	5	6	
Moran, Amby	(Canada)	D	1926–1927	12	0	0	0	10	—	—	—	—	—	
Morenz, Howie	(Canada)	C	1923–1934; 1936–1937	460	257	160	417	499	37	13	9	22	58	
Morin, Pete	(Canada)	LW	1941–1942	31	10	12	22	7	1	0	0	0	0	
Morissette, Dave	(Canada)	LW	1998–2000	11	0	0	0	57	—	—	—	—	—	
Morrow, Joe	(Canada)	D	2017–2018	38	1	4	5	0	—	—	—	—	—	
Mosdell, Ken	(Canada)	C	1944–1956; 1957–1959	627	132	155	287	449	80	16	13	29	48	
Muller, Kirk	(Canada)	LW	1991–1995	267	104	143	247	292	38	20	12	32	53	
Mummery, Harry	(United States)	D	1920–1921	24	15	5	20	69	—	—	—	—	—	
Munro, Dunc	(Canada)	D	1931–1932	48	1	1	2	14	4	0	0	0	2	
Murdoch, Bob	(Canada)	D	1970–1973	81	3	25	28	65	16	0	3	3	10	
Murray, Chris	(Canada)	RW	1994–1997	107	7	6	13	281	4	0	0	0	4	
Murray, Garth	(Canada)	C	2005–2008	80	7	2	9	76	6	0	0	0	0	
Murray, Leo	(Canada)	C	1932–1933	6	0	0	0	2	—	—	—	—	—	
Napier, Mark	(Canada)	RW	1978–1984	367	145	159	304	62	33	8	10	18	4	
Naslund, Mats	(Sweden)	LW	1982–1990	617	243	369	612	107	97	34	57	91	33	
Nasreddine, Alain	(Canada)	D	1998–1999	8	0	0	0	33	—	—	—	—	—	
Nattress, Ric	(Canada)	D	1982–1985	79	1	16	17	36	5	0	0	0	12	
Nesterov, Nikita	(Russia)	D	2016–2017	13	1	4	5	4	2	0	0	0	0	
Newberry, John	(Canada)	C	1982–1985	19	0	4	4	6	2	0	0	0	0	
Newhook, Alex	(Canada)	C	2023–2025	137	30	30	60	42	5	1	1	2	4	
Newman, Dan	(Canada)	RW	1978–1979	16	0	2	2	4	—	—	—	—	—	
Niku, Sami	(Finland)	D	2021–2022	13	0	6	6	2	—	—	—	—	—	
Niinimaa, Janne	(Finland)	D	2006–2007	41	0	3	3	36	—	—	—	—	—	
Nilan, Chris	(United States)	RW	1979–1988; 1991–1992	523	88	87	175	2248	84	8	5	13	422	
Norlinder, Mattias	(Sweden)	D	2021–2022	6	0	1	1	2	—	—	—	—	—	
Nyrop, Bill	(United States)	D	1975–1978	165	8	43	51	66	33	1	7	8	22	
O'Byrne, Ryan	(Canada)	D	2007–2011	70	1	11	12	103	19	0	0	0		
O'Connor, Bud	(Canada)	C	1941–1947	271	78	155	233	22	35	10	15	25	2	
O'Neill, Jim	(Canada)	C	1940–1942	16	0	4	4	4	3	0	0	0	0	
Odelein, Lyle	(Canada)	D	1989–1996	420	20	75	95	1367	52	2	6	8	118	
Odjick, Gino	(Canada)	LW	2000–2002	49	5	4	9	148	12	1	0	1	47	
Olmstead, Bert	(Canada)	LW	1950–1958	508	103	280	383	609	86	8	34	42	78	
Olofsson, Gustav	(Sweden)	D	2019–2020	3	0	0	0	2	—	—	—	—	—	
Orleski, Dave	(Canada)	D	1980–1982	2	0	0	0	0	—	—	—	—	—	
Ott, Steve	(Canada)	LW	2016–2017	11	0	1	1	17	6	0	0	0	0	
Ouellet, Xavier	(France)	D	2018–2021	37	0	5	5	19	10	0	1	1	14	
Pacioretty, Max	(United States)	LW	2008–2018	626	226	222	448	339	38	10	9	19	35	
Palangio, Pete	(Canada)	LW	1926–1927; 1928–1929	8	0	0	0	0	4	0	0	0	0	
Paquette, Cedric	(Canada)	C	2021–2022	24	0	2	2	25	—	—	—	—	—	
Parenteau, P. A.	(Canada)	LW	2014–2015	11	2	3	5	6	—	—	—	—	—	
Pargeter, George	(Canada)	LW	1946–1947	4	0	0	0	0	—	—	—	—	—	
Paslawski, Greg	(Canada)	RW	1983–1984	26	1	4	5	4	—	—	—	—	—	
Pateryn, Greg	(United States)	D	2012–2016	58	1	6	7	55	7	0	3	3	0	
Patterson, George	(Canada)	LW	1927–1929	60	4	6	10	34	3	0	0	0	2	
Paulhus, Roland	(Canada)	D	1925–1926	33	0	0	0	0	—	—	—	—	—	
Payer, Evariste	(Canada)	C	1917–1918	1	0	0	0	0	—	—	—	—	—	
Pearson, Tanner	(Canada)	LW	2023–2024	54	5	8	13	21	—	—	—	—	—	
Peca, Matthew	(Canada)	C	2018–2020	44	3	7	10	4	—	—	—	—	—	
Pederson, Mark	(Canada)	LW	1989–1991	56	8	17	25	20	2	0	0	0	0	
Pennington, Cliff	(Canada)	C	1960–1961	4	1	0	1	0	—	—	—	—	—	
Perezhogin, Alexander	(Russia)	RW	2005–2007	128	15	19	34	86	6	1	1	2	4	
Perreault, Mathieu	(Canada)	C	2021–2022	25	4	5	9	4	—	—	—	—	—	
Perreault, Yanic	(Canada)	C	2001–2004	224	67	66	133	110	20	5	7	12	0	
Perry, Corey	(Canada)	RW	2020–2021	49	9	12	21	39	22	4	6	10	25	
Peters, Garry	(Canada)	C	1964–1965; 1966–1967	17	0	3	3	8	—	—	—	—	—	
Peters, Jimmy	(Canada)	RW	1945–1948	129	23	35	58	43	20	4	3	7	16	
Petrov, Oleg	(Russia)	RW	1992–1996; 1999–2003	365	70	113	183	99	20	1	6	7	2	
Petry, Jeff	(United States)	D	2014–2022	508	70	178	248	186	48	5	8	13	18	
Pezzetta, Michael	(Canada)	C	2021–2025	200	15	23	38	241	—	—	—	—	—	
Phillips, Charlie	(Canada)	D	1942–1943	17	0	0	0	6	—	—	—	—	—	
Picard, Noel	(Canada)	D	1964–1965	16	0	7	7	33	3	0	1	1	0	
Picard, Robert	(Canada)	D	1980–1984	141	11	61	72	172	9	1	1	2	7	
Pitlick, Rem	(United States)	C	2021–2023	92	15	26	41	34	—	—	—	—	—	
Pitlick, Tyler	(United States)	C	2021–2022	14	1	2	3	4	—	—	—	—	—	
Pitre, Didier	(Canada)	D	1917–1923	127	64	34	98	84	9	2	4	6	16	
Plamondon, Gerry	(Canada)	LW	1945–1946; 1947–1951	74	7	13	20	10	11	5	2	7	2	
Pleau, Larry	(United States)	C	1969–1972	94	9	15	24	27	4	0	0	0	0	
Plekanec, Tomas	(Czech Republic)	C	2003–2019	984	233	373	606	537	87	16	33	49	50	
Poehling, Ryan	(United States)	C	2018–2022	85	13	9	22	10	—	—	—	—	—	
Poirier, Gordon	(Canada)	C	1939–1940	10	0	0	0	0	—	—	—	—	—	
Polich, Mike	(United States)	C	1976–1978	1	0	0	0	0	5	0	0	0	0	
Popovic, Peter	(Sweden)	D	1993–1998	303	7	48	55	173	25	1	4	5	8	
Portland, Jack	(Canada)	D	1933–1935; 1940–1943	173	7	32	39	151	13	1	3	4	4	
Poulin, Patrick	(Canada)	LW	1997–2002	277	31	44	75	65	3	0	0	0	0	
Pouliot, Benoit	(Canada)	LW	2009–2011	118	28	26	54	118	21	0	2	2		
Price, Noel	(Canada)	D	1965–1967	39	0	9	9	16	3	0	1	1	0	
Pronovost, Andre	(Canada)	LW	1956–1961	290	48	61	109	226	37	6	3	9	26	
Proulx, Christian	(Canada)	D	1993–1994	7	1	2	3	20	—	—	—	—	—	
Provost, Claude	(Canada)	RW	1955–1970	1005	254	335	589	469	126	25	38	63	86	
Prust, Brandon	(Canada)	LW	2012–2015	172	15	30	45	365	29	1	6	7	81	
Pusie, Jean	(Canada)	D	1930–1932; 1935–1936	38	0	2	2	11	3	0	0	0	0	
Pyatt, Tom	(Canada)	C	2009–2011	101	4	8	12	19	25	2	2	4	2	
Quilty, John	(Canada)	C	1940–1942; 1946–1948	119	33	32	65	79	13	3	5	8	9	
Quintal, Stephane	(Canada)	D	1995–1999; 2001–2004	507	37	78	115	637	36	1	7	8	30	
Racine, Yves	(Canada)	D	1994–1996	72	4	10	14	68	—	—	—	—	—	
Radulov, Alexander	(Russia)	RW	2016–2017	76	18	36	54	62	6	2	5	7	6	
Ramage, Rob	(Canada)	D	1992–1994	14	0	2	2	10	7	0	0	0	4	
Raymond, Armand	(United States)	D	1937–1938; 1939–1940	22	0	2	2	10	—	—	—	—	—	
Raymond, Paul	(Canada)	RW	1932–1935; 1938–1939	76	2	3	5	6	5	0	0	0	2	
Reardon, Ken	(Canada)	D	1940–1942; 1945–1950	341	26	96	122	604	31	2	5	7	62	
Reardon, Terry	(Canada)	C	1941–1943	46	23	23	46	16	3	2	2	4	2	
Reaume, Marc	(Canada)	D	1963–1964	3	0	0	0	2	—	—	—	—	—	
Reay, Billy	(Canada)	C	1945–1953	475	103	162	265	202	63	13	16	29	43	
Recchi, Mark	(Canada)	RW	1994–1999	346	120	202	322	222	21	11	13	24	8	
Redmond, Mickey	(Canada)	RW	1967–1971	221	56	62	118	112	16	2	3	5	2	
Redmond, Zach	(United States)	D	2016–2017	16	0	5	5	2	—	—	—	—	—	
Reilly, Mike	(United States)	D	2017–2020	90	3	20	23	30	—	—	—	—	—	
Ribeiro, Mike	(Canada)	C	1999–2006	276	50	103	153	92	17	2	3	5	18	
Richard, Anthony	(Canada)	C	2022–2023	13	3	2	5	6	—	—	—	—	—	
Richard, Henri	(Canada)	C	1955–1975	1256	358	688	1046	928	180	49	80	129	181	
Richard, Maurice	(Canada)	RW	1942–1960	978	544	421	965	1285	133	82	44	126	188	
Richer, Stephane	(Canada)	RW	1984–1991; 1996–1998	490	225	196	421	339	77	36	21	57	51	
Richter, Barry	(United States)	D	1999–2001	25	0	2	2	10	—	—	—	—	—	
Riley, Jack	(Republic of Ireland)	RW	1933–1935	95	10	22	32	8	4	0	3	3	0	
Riopelle, Howard	(Canada)	LW	1947–1950	169	27	16	43	73	8	1	1	2	2	
Risebrough, Doug	(Canada)	C	1974–1982	493	117	185	302	959	74	11	20	31	143	
Ritchie, Dave	(Canada)	D	1920–1921; 1924–1926	13	0	0	0	2	1	0	0	0	0	
Rivers, Gus	(Canada)	RW	1929–1932	88	4	5	9	12	16	2	0	2	2	
Rivet, Craig	(Canada)	D	1994–2007	653	39	112	151	795	39	1	10	11	24	
Roberge, Mario	(Canada)	LW	1990–1995	112	7	7	14	314	15	0	0	0	24	
Robert, Claude	(Canada)	LW	1950–1951	23	1	0	1	9	—	—	—	—	—	
Roberto, Phil	(Canada)	RW	1969–1972	74	17	10	27	106	15	0	1	1	36	
Roberts, Jim	(Canada)	D	1963–1967; 1971–1977	611	63	100	163	303	101	11	7	18	90	
Robertson, George	(Canada)	LW	1947–1949	31	2	5	7	6	—	—	—	—	—	
Robidas, Stephane	(Canada)	D	1999–2002	122	7	16	23	28	2	0	0	0	4	
Robinson, Earl	(Canada)	RW	1939–1940	11	1	4	5	4	—	—	—	—	—	
Robinson, Larry	(Canada)	D	1972–1989	1202	197	686	883	706	203	25	109	134	186	
Robinson, Moe	(Canada)	D	1979–1980	1	0	0	0	0	—	—	—	—	—	
Roche, Des	(Canada)	RW	1934–1935	5	0	1	1	0	—	—	—	—	—	
Roche, Ernie	(Canada)	D	1950–1951	4	0	0	0	2	—	—	—	—	—	
Rochefort, Leon	(Canada)	RW	1963–1967; 1970–1971	97	16	18	34	10	24	2	2	4	14	
Romanov, Alexander	(Russia)	D	2020–2022	133	4	15	19	74	4	1	0	1	0	
Ronan, Ed	(United States)	RW	1991–1995	147	12	19	31	74	21	3	3	6	10	
Ronty, Paul	(Canada)	C	1954–1955	4	0	0	0	2	5	0	0	0	2	
Rooney, Steve	(United States)	C	1984–1987	43	3	3	6	143	12	2	2	4	19	
Root, Bill	(Canada)	D	1982–1984	118	6	16	22	69	—	—	—	—	—	
Rossignol, Felix	(Canada)	RW	1944–1945	5	2	2	4	2	1	0	0	0	2	
Rota, Randy	(Canada)	C	1972–1973	2	1	1	2	0	—	—	—	—	—	
Rousseau, Bobby	(Canada)	RW	1960–1970	643	200	322	522	317	78	16	29	45	54	
Rousseau, Guy	(Canada)	LW	1954–1955; 1956–1957	4	0	1	1	0	—	—	—	—	—	
Rousseau, Rollie	(Canada)	D	1952–1953	2	0	0	0	0	—	—	—	—	—	
Roy, Joshua	(Canada)	RW	2023–2025	35	6	5	11	2	—	—	—	—	—	
Rucinsky, Martin	(Czech Republic)	LW	1995–2002	432	134	163	297	398	15	3	0	3	8	
Rundqvist, Thomas	(Sweden)	C	1984–1985	2	0	1	1	0	—	—	—	—	—	
Runge, Paul	(Canada)	C	1934–1937	19	1	2	3	8	—	—	—	—	—	
Ryan, Terry	(Canada)	LW	1996–1999	8	0	0	0	36	—	—	—	—	—	
Rychel, Kerby	(United States)	LW	2017–2018	4	1	1	2	2	—	—	—	—	—	
Ryder, Michael	(Canada)	D	2003–2008	314	99	108	207	156	21	3	5	8	6	
Samsanov, Sergei	(Russia)	LW	2006–2007	63	9	17	26	10	—	—	—	—	—	
Sandelin, Scott	(United States)	D	1986–1988	9	0	1	1	2	—	—	—	—	—	
Sands, Charlie	(Canada)	C	1939–1943	159	28	58	86	20	7	1	1	2	2	
Sarault, Yves	(Canada)	LW	1994–1996	22	0	1	1	4	—	—	—	—	—	
Sather, Glen	(Canada)	LW	1974–1975	63	6	10	16	44	11	1	1	2	4	
Savage, Brian	(Canada)	LW	1993–2002	461	155	130	285	225	23	1	7	8	8	
Savage, Gordon	(Canada)	D	1934–1935	41	1	5	6	4	2	0	0	0	0	
Savard, David	(Canada)	D	2021–2025	259	13	63	76	136	5	0	1	1	0	
Savard, Denis	(Canada)	C	1990–1993	210	72	107	179	215	38	5	25	30	47	
Savard, Serge	(Canada)	D	1966–1981	917	100	312	412	537	123	19	49	68	84	
Scherbak, Nikita	(Russia)	D	2016–2018	29	5	2	7	8	—	—	—	—	—	
Schlemko, David	(Canada)	D	2017–2019	55	1	6	7	10	—	—	—	—	—	
Schneider, Mathieu	(United States)	D	1987–1988; 1989–1995; 2008–2009	383	68	148	216	378	46	5	16	21	75	
Schofield, Dwight	(United States)	D	1982–1983	2	0	0	0	7	—	—	—	—	—	
Schueneman, Corey	(United States)	D	2021–2023	31	2	5	7	8	—	—	—	—	—	
Schutt, Rod	(Canada)	LW	1977–1978	2	0	0	0	0	—	—	—	—	—	
Scott, John	(Canada)	LW	2015–2016	1	0	0	0	2	—	—	—	—	—	
Sekac, Jiri	(Czech Republic)	RW	2014–2015	6	1	0	1	0	—	—	—	—	—	
Semin, Alexander	(Russia)	RW	2015–2016	15	1	3	4	12	—	—	—	—	—	
Sergachev, Mikhail	(Russia)	D	2016–2017	4	0	0	0	0	—	—	—	—	—	
Sevigny, Pierre	(Canada)	LW	1993–1995; 1996–1997	75	4	5	9	62	3	0	1	1	0	
Shanahan, Sean	(Canada)	C	1975–1976	4	0	0	0	0	—	—	—	—	—	
Shannon, Darryl	(Canada)	D	2000–2001	7	0	1	1	6	—	—	—	—	—	
Shaw, Andrew	(Canada)	RW	2016–2019	182	41	55	96	234	5	0	0	0	7	
Shaw, Logan	(Canada)	RW	2017–2018	30	2	4	6	8	—	—	—	—	—	
Sheehan, Bobby	(United States)	C	1969–1971	45	8	6	14	4	6	0	0	0	0	
Shutt, Steve	(Canada)	LW	1972–1985	871	408	368	776	400	96	50	48	98	61	
Siebert, Babe	(Canada)	LW	1936–1939	125	25	38	63	130	11	2	3	5	2	
Simpson, Reid	(Canada)	LW	2001–2002	25	1	1	2	63	—	—	—	—	—	
Simpson, Todd	(Canada)	D	2005–2006	6	0	0	0	14	—	—	—	—	—	
Singbush, Alex	(Canada)	D	1940–1941	32	0	5	5	15	3	0	0	0	4	
Skov, Glen	(Canada)	C	1960–1961	3	0	0	0	0	—	—	—	—	—	
Skrudland, Brian	(Canada)	C	1985–1993	475	78	139	217	592	101	14	37	51	261	
Slafkovsky, Juraj	(Slovakia)	LW	2022–2025	200	42	69	111	133	5	2	0	2	4	
Smart, Alex	(Canada)	LW	1942–1943	8	5	2	7	0	—	—	—	—	—	
Smith, Bobby	(Canada)	C	1983–1990	505	172	310	482	430	107	38	46	84	139	
Smith, Des	(Canada)	D	1938–1939	16	3	3	6	8	3	0	0	0	4	
Smith, Don	(Canada)	LW	1919–1920	12	1	0	1	6	—	—	—	—	—	
Smith, Stuart	(Canada)	LW	1940–1942	4	2	2	4	2	1	0	0	0	0	
Smith-Pelly, Devante	(Canada)	RW	2015–2016	66	7	8	15	34	12	1	2	3	2	
Smolinski, Bryan	(United States)	C	2007–2008	64	8	17	25	20	12	1	2	3	2	
Smrke, Stan	(Canada)	LW	1956–1958	9	0	3	3	0	—	—	—	—	—	
Souray, Sheldon	(Canada)	D	1999–2007	324	62	98	160	556	29	3	5	8	63	
Spacek, Jaroslav	(Czech Republic)	D	2009–2012	145	4	36	40	97	17	1	3	4		
St-Laurent, Dollard	(Canada)	D	1950–1958	383	19	82	101	306	59	1	14	15	55	
Staal, Eric	(Canada)	C	2020–2021	21	2	1	3	2	21	2	6	8	6	
Stahan, Frank	(Canada)	D	1944–1945	—	—	—	—	—	3	0	1	1	2	
Starr, Harold	(Canada)	D	1932–1933	15	0	0	0	6	2	0	0	0	2	
Stephens, Mitchell	(Canada)	C	2023–2024	23	2	1	3	4	—	—	—	—	—	
Stevens, Phil	(Canada)	C	1921–1922	4	0	0	0	0	—	—	—	—	—	
Stevenson, Turner	(Canada)	RW	1992–2000	385	45	66	111	611	24	4	8	12	16	
Stewart, Gaye	(Canada)	LW	1952–1954	5	0	2	2	0	3	0	0	0	0	
Stewart, Greg	(Canada)	LW	2008–2010	26	0	1	1	48	2	0	0	0	2	
Stock, P. J.	(Canada)	C	2000–2001	20	1	2	3	32	—	—	—	—	—	
Streit, Mark	(Switzerland)	D	2005–2018	207	25	84	109	70	12	1	3	4	8	
Struble, Jayden	(United States)	D	2023–2025	112	5	18	23	109	2	0	0	0	0	
Subban, P. K.	(Canada)	D	2010–2016	434	63	215	278	532	55	11	27	38	94	
Summerhill, Bill	(Canada)	RW	1937–1940	56	9	12	21	52	3	0	0	0	2	
Sundstrom, Niklas	(Sweden)	RW	2002–2006	154	19	30	49	56	9	1	3	4	6	
Sutherland, Bill	(Canada)	C	1962–1963	—	—	—	—	—	2	0	0	0	0	
Svoboda, Petr	(Czechoslovakia)	D	1984–1992	534	39	190	229	761	72	2	28	30	75	
Suzuki, Nick	(Canada)	C	2019–2025	455	138	237	375	139	37	13	12	25	4	
Talbot, Jean-Guy	(Canada)	D	1954–1967	791	36	209	245	884	105	3	16	19	112	
Tanguay, Alex	(Canada)	LW	2008–2009	50	16	25	41	34	2	0	1	1	2	
Tardif, Marc	(Canada)	LW	1969–1973	245	78	79	157	289	40	11	10	21	55	
Tatar, Tomas	(Slovakia)	C	2018–2021	198	57	92	149	78	15	2	1	3	6	
Teal, Jeff	(United States)	C	1984–1985	6	0	1	1	0	—	—	—	—	—	
Teasdale, Joel	(Canada)	F	2022–2023	2	0	1	1	0	—	—	—	—	—	
Tessier, Orval	(Canada)	C	1954–1955	4	0	0	0	0	—	—	—	—	—	
Thibaudeau, Gilles	(Canada)	C	1986–1989	58	12	15	27	6	8	3	3	6	2	
Thibeault, Larry	(Canada)	LW	1945–1946	1	0	0	0	0	—	—	—	—	—	
Thomas, Christian	(Canada)	RW	2015–2016	5	0	2	2	2	—	—	—	—	—	
Thomson, Rhys	(Canada)	D	1939–1940	7	0	0	0	16	—	—	—	—	—	
Thompson, Nate	(United States)	C	2018–2020	88	5	16	21	21	—	—	—	—	—	
Thornton, Scott	(Canada)	LW	1996–2000	222	25	26	51	443	14	1	2	3	12	
Tierney, Chris	(Canada)	C	2022–2023	23	1	6	7	4	—	—	—	—	—	
Tinordi, Jarred	(United States)	D	2012–2016	33	0	4	4	47	5	0	1	1	1	
Toffoli, Tyler	(Canada)	C	2020–2022	89	37	33	70	28	22	5	9	14	6	
Trader, Larry	(Canada)	D	1987–1988	30	2	4	6	19	—	—	—	—	—	
Traverse, Patrick	(Canada)	D	2000–2003	109	4	19	23	48	—	—	—	—	—	
Tremblay, Gilles	(Canada)	LW	1960–1969	509	168	162	330	161	48	9	14	23	4	
Tremblay, J. C.	(Canada)	D	1959–1972	794	57	306	363	204	108	14	51	65	58	
Tremblay, Marcel	(Canada)	RW	1938–1939	10	0	2	2	0	—	—	—	—	—	
Tremblay, Mario	(Canada)	RW	1974–1986	852	258	326	584	1043	101	20	29	49	187	
Tremblay, Nils	(Canada)	C	1944–1946	3	0	1	1	0	2	0	0	0	0	
Trudel, Louis	(United States)	LW	1938–1941	94	22	23	45	28	3	1	0	1	0	
Tucker, Darcy	(Canada)	RW	1995–1998	115	8	18	26	167	4	0	0	0	0	
Tudin, Connie	(Canada)	C	1941–1942	4	0	1	1	4	—	—	—	—	—	
Turcotte, Alfie	(United States)	C	1983–1986	85	15	23	38	47	5	0	0	0	0	
Turgeon, Pierre	(Canada)	C	1994–1997	104	50	77	127	50	6	2	4	6	2	
Turgeon, Sylvain	(Canada)	LW	1990–1992	75	14	18	32	59	10	1	0	1	6	
Turnbull, Perry	(Canada)	C	1983–1984	40	6	7	13	59	9	1	2	3	10	
Turner, Bob	(Canada)	D	1955–1961	339	8	46	54	235	50	0	4	4	32	
Ulanov, Igor	(Russia)	D	1997–2000	123	4	15	19	197	10	1	4	5	12	
Vadnais, Carol	(Canada)	D	1966–1968	42	1	4	5	66	2	0	0	0	2	
Valiev, Rinat	(Russia)	D	2017–2018	2	0	0	0	2	—	—	—	—	—	
Vallis, Lindsay	(Canada)	RW	1993–1994	1	0	0	0	0	—	—	—	—	—	
Van Allen, Shaun	(Canada)	C	2001–2002	54	6	9	15	20	7	0	1	1	2	
Vanek, Thomas	(Austria)	LW	2013–2014	18	6	9	15	17	5	5	5	10	41	
Van Boxmeer, John	(Canada)	D	1973–1977	79	7	18	25	49	1	0	0	0	0	
Vejdemo, Lukas	(Sweden)	C	2019–2022	13	2	0	2	0	—	—	—	—	—	
Vujtek, Vladimir	(Czechoslovakia)	LW	1991–1992	2	0	0	0	0	—	—	—	—	—	
Vukota, Mick	(Canada)	RW	1997–1998	22	0	0	0	76	1	0	0	0	0	
Walter, Ryan	(Canada)	C	1982–1991	604	141	208	349	419	100	16	32	48	54	
Walton, Bob	(Canada)	C	1943–1944	4	0	0	0	0	—	—	—	—	—	
Ward, Jason	(Canada)	RW	1999–2001; 2002–2004	105	10	10	20	43	5	0	2	2	2	
Ward, Jimmy	(Canada)	RW	1938–1939	36	4	3	7	0	1	0	0	0	0	
Warwic, Grant	(Canada)	RW	1949–1950	26	2	6	8	19	—	—	—	—	—	
Wasnie, Nick	(Canada)	RW	1929–1932	136	31	15	46	106	20	6	3	9	20	
Watson, Bryan	(Canada)	D	1963–1965; 1967–1968	56	0	4	4	34	6	0	0	0	2	
Watson, Phil	(Canada)	RW	1943–1944	44	17	32	49	61	9	3	5	8	16	
Weal, Jordan	(Canada)	C	2018–2020	65	12	13	25	16	2	0	0	0	0	
Weaver, Mike	(Canada)	D	2014–2015	11	0	1	1	0	—	—	—	—	—	
Weber, Shea	(Canada)	D	2016–2021	275	58	88	146	146	38	5	9	14	49	
Weber, Yannick	(Switzerland)	D	2008–2013	3	0	1	1	0	3	1	1	2	0	
Weinrich, Eric	(United States)	D	1998–2001	203	16	56	72	150	—	—	—	—	—	
Weise, Dale	(Canada)	RW	2013–2016; 2018–2020	184	28	36	64	93	33	5	5	10	22	
Wentworth, Marvin	(Canada)	D	1938–1940	77	1	6	7	18	3	0	0	0	4	
White, Colin	(United States)	C	2023–2024	17	0	0	0	2	—	—	—	—	—	
White, Moe	(Canada)	LW	1945–1946	4	0	1	1	2	—	—	—	—	—	
White, Ryan	(Canada)	C	2009–2014	141	5	12	17	232	10	1	0	1		
Wickenheiser, Doug	(Canada)	C	1980–1984	202	49	66	115	118	—	—	—	—	—	
Wideman, Chris	(United States)	D	2021–2023	110	4	29	33	148	—	—	—	—	—	
Wilkie, David	(United States)	D	1994–1998	91	8	14	22	77	8	1	2	3	14	
Willson, Don	(Canada)	C	1937–1939	22	2	7	9	0	3	0	0	0	0	
Wilson, Cully	(Canada)	RW	1920–1921	11	6	1	7	29	—	—	—	—	—	
Wilson, Jerry	(Canada)	C	1956–1957	3	0	0	0	2	—	—	—	—	—	
Wilson, Murray	(Canada)	LW	1972–1978	328	83	80	163	148	52	5	14	19	32	
Wilson, Ron	(Canada)	C	1993–1994	48	2	10	12	12	4	0	0	0	0	
Witehall, Johan	(Sweden)	LW	2000–2001	26	1	1	2	6	—	—	—	—	—	
Wyman, J. T.	(United States)	RW	2009–2010	3	0	0	0	0	—	—	—	—	—	
Xhekaj, Arber	(Canada)	D	2022–2025	165	9	20	29	300	3	0	0	0	4	
Ylonen, Jesse	(Finland)	RW	2020–2024	111	12	17	29	14	—	—	—	—	—	
Young, Doug	(Canada)	D	1939–1941	50	3	9	12	26	—	—	—	—	—	
Zalapski, Zarley	(Canada)	D	1997–1998	28	1	5	6	22	6	0	1	1	4	
Zednik, Richard	(Slovakia)	RW	2000–2006	322	98	85	183	259	21	9	7	16	12	
Zholtok, Sergei	(Latvia)	C	1998–2001	170	34	37	71	42	—	—	—	—	—	
Zubrus, Dainius	(Lithuania)	RW	1998–2001	139	29	45	74	88	—	—	—	—	—	
