= Lorne Rose =

Canadian ice hockey player

- Born: December 17, 1896; Peterborough, Ontario, Canada
- Died: July 2, 1975 (aged 78)
- Height: 5 ft 5 in (165 cm)
- Weight: 134 lb (61 kg; 9 st 8 lb)
- Position: Defence
- Played for: Saskatoon Crescents
- Playing career: 1922–1928

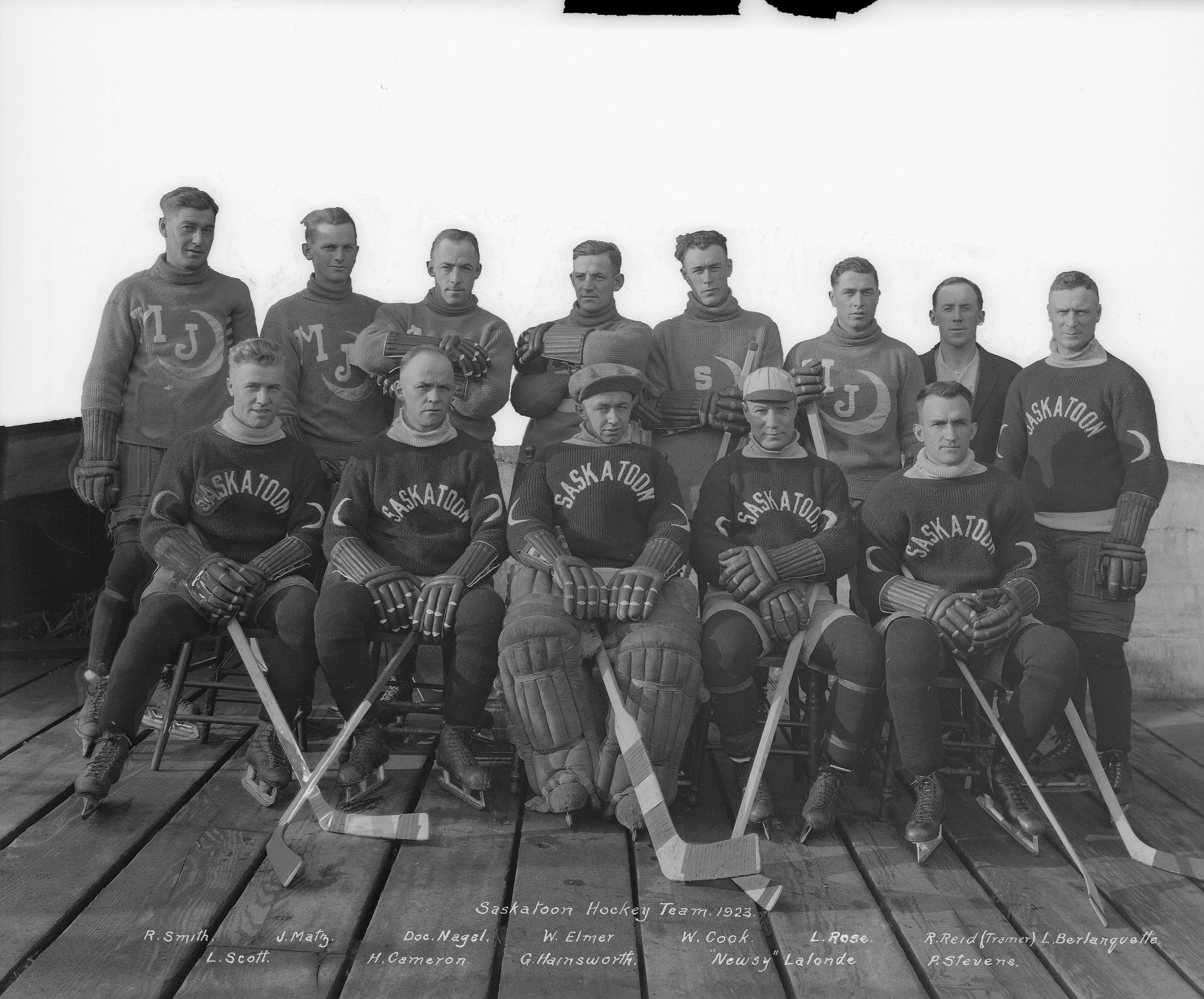
Rose, standing third from right, with the Saskatoon Sheiks/Crescents in 1923–24.

Lawrence Rose (December 17, 1896 – July 2, 1975) was a professional ice hockey player. He played with the Saskatoon Crescents of the Western Canada Hockey League. He later went on to play in the Prairie Hockey League with the Moose Jaw Maroons and Regina Capitals.
