= Harry Connor =

Canadian ice hockey player

- Born: December 3, 1904; Ottawa, Ontario, Canada
- Died: March 2, 1947 (aged 42)
- Height: 6 ft 0 in (183 cm)
- Weight: 195 lb (88 kg; 13 st 13 lb)
- Position: Left wing
- Shot: Left
- Played for: Boston Bruins; New York Americans; Ottawa Senators
- Playing career: 1926–1933

Henry Alexander Connor (December 3, 1904 – March 2, 1947) was a Canadian ice hockey forward who played 135 games in the National Hockey League between 1927 and 1931. Connor played for the Ottawa Senators, Boston Bruins, and New York Americans. Connor was born in Ottawa, Ontario.

== Career statistics ==
=== Regular season and playoffs ===
			Regular season					Playoffs
Season	Team	League	GP	G	A	Pts	PIM	GP	G	A	Pts	PIM
1923–24	Ottawa Munitions	OCHL	—	—	—	—	—	—	—	—	—	—
1924–25	Ottawa Rideaus	OCHL	15	8	1	9	—	3	0	0	0	0
1925–26	Guelph Royals	OHA Sr	—	—	—	—	—	—	—	—	—	—
1926–27	Saskatoon Sheiks	PrHL	32	22	14	36	73	3	1	0	1	4
1927–28	Boston Bruins	NHL	42	9	1	10	36	2	0	0	0	0
1928–29	New York Americans	NHL	43	6	2	8	83	2	0	0	0	2
1929–30	Ottawa Senators	NHL	25	1	2	3	22	—	—	—	—	—
1929–30	Boston Bruins	NHL	13	0	0	0	4	6	0	0	0	0
1930–31	Ottawa Senators	NHL	11	0	0	0	4	—	—	—	—	—
1930–31	London Tecumsehs	IHL	15	3	0	3	8	—	—	—	—	—
1931–32	Providence Reds	Can-Am	29	12	13	25	18	5	0	1	1	2
1932–33	Providence Reds	Can-Am	36	8	7	15	30	—	—	—	—	—
1932–33	Quebec Castors	Can-Am	11	3	4	7	24	—	—	—	—	—
NHL totals			134	16	5	21	149	10	0	0	0	2
