= Max Sutherland =

Max Sutherland may refer to:

- Max Sutherland (Home and Away), a character on the Australian soap opera Home and Away
- Max Sutherland (ice hockey) (1904–1984), Canadian ice hockey player
