= Moose Jaw Arena =

- Full name: Moose Jaw Arena
- Location: Moose Jaw, Saskatchewan, Canada
- Capacity: 3,700

Construction
- Opened: 1920
- Demolished: 1955

Tenants
- Moose Jaw Sheiks and Moose Jaw Maroons (WCHL), Moose Jaw Canucks (WCJHL)

Moose Jaw Arena was an indoor arena in Moose Jaw, Saskatchewan, Canada. It was built in 1910 and was the home of the Moose Jaw Sheiks and Moose Jaw Maroons of the WCHL and Moose Jaw Canucks of the WCJHL. The arena was destroyed by a fire in August 1955. It was eventually replaced by the Moose Jaw Civic Centre.
