= 1926–27 PHL season =

Prairie Hockey League season

The 1926–27 season was the first year for the Prairie Hockey League (PHL). The PHL was a reorganisation of the Western Hockey League after it folded the previous year. Five teams each played 32 games.

== Teams ==
1926–27 Prairie Hockey League
Team	City	Arena	Capacity
Calgary Tigers	Calgary, Alberta	Victoria Arena	N/A
Edmonton Eskimos	Edmonton, Alberta	Edmonton Stock Pavilion	2,000
Moose Jaw Warriors	Moose Jaw, Saskatchewan	Moose Jaw Arena	3,700
Regina Capitals	Regina, Saskatchewan	Regina Stadium	N/A
Saskatoon Sheiks	Saskatoon, Saskatchewan	Crescent Arena	N/A

=== Map of teams ===
PHL Teams

== Regular season ==
=== Final standings ===
Note: W = Wins, L = Losses, T = Ties, GF= Goals For, GA = Goals Against, Pts = Points
Teams that qualified for the playoffs are highlighted in bold

Prairie Hockey League	GP	W	L	T	Pts	GF	GA
**Calgary Tigers**	32	22	9	1	45	119	68
**Saskatoon Sheiks**	32	14	15	3	31	103	94
Regina Capitals	32	14	16	2	30	110	117
Moose Jaw Warriors	32	13	17	2	28	108	117
Edmonton Eskimos	32	12	18	2	26	83	127

=== Scoring leaders ===
Note: GP = Games played; G = Goals; A = Assists; Pts = Points; PIM = Penalty minutes

Player	Team	GP	G	A	Pts	PIM
Jack Connolly	Moose Jaw Warriors	32	29	24	53	61
Emory "Spunk" Sparrow	Calgary Tigers	32	26	25	51	58
Harry Cameron	Saskatoon Sheiks	31	26	19	45	20
Syl Acaster	Regina Capitals	32	21	20	41	13
Harry Connor	Saskatoon Sheiks	32	22	14	36	73
Johnny Gottselig	Regina Capitals	32	23	7	30	21
Pete Mitchell	Moose Jaw Warriors	32	16	14	30	6
Ernie Anderson	Calgary Tigers	32	24	5	29	23
Norman "Dutch" Gainor	Calgary Tigers	23	16	11	27	38
John "Crutchy" Morrison	Regina Capitals	30	20	6	26	18
Fern Headley	Calgary Tigers	30	16	10	26	30

== League championship ==
The Calgary Tigers won the Prairie Hockey League championship by forfeit over the Saskatoon Sheiks. Saskatoon refused to continue the playoff series after complaining about the referee in game one, won by the Tigers 2–1.

== See also ==
- List of NHL seasons
- 1926 in sports
- 1927 in sports

Preceded by 1925–26 WHL season	PHL seasons	Succeeded by 1927–28 PHL season
