= 1927–28 PHL season =

Canadian ice hockey league season

The 1927–28 season was the second and last season of the Prairie Hockey League (PHL). Two of the league's three remaining teams played 26 games while the third team played 28.

== Teams ==
1927–28 Prairie Hockey League
Team	City	Arena	Capacity
Moose Jaw Maroons	Moose Jaw, Saskatchewan	Moose Jaw Arena	3,700
Regina Capitals	Regina, Saskatchewan	Regina Stadium	N/A
Saskatoon Sheiks	Saskatoon, Saskatchewan	Crescent Arena	N/A

=== Map of teams ===
PHL Teams

== Regular season ==
Two teams, the Edmonton Eskimos and Calgary Tigers, folded after the previous season leaving only three teams for this, the last PHL season. The Saskatoon Sheiks, who had finished second overall the previous season, finished first overall for this one.

=== Final standings ===
Note: W = Wins, L = Losses, T = Ties, GF= Goals For, GA = Goals Against, Pts = Points

Prairie Hockey League	GP	W	L	T	Pts	GF	GA
Saskatoon Sheiks	28	18	5	5	41	86	39
Moose Jaw Maroons	26	12	8	6	30	61	61
Regina Capitals	26	2	19	5	9	46	89

== League championship ==
In the second and last championship of the Prairie Hockey League, the Saskatoon Sheiks won the PHL Championship. The Moose Jaw Maroons were the runner-up.

== See also ==
- Ice hockey at the 1928 Winter Olympics
- List of NHL seasons
- 1927 in sports
- 1928 in sports

Preceded by 1926–27 PHL season	PHL seasons	Succeeded by Dissolved
