= Moose Jaw Maroons =

- City: Moose Jaw, Saskatchewan
- League: Prairie Hockey League
- Operated: 1926–1928

Franchise history
- 1926–27: Moose Jaw Warriors
- 1927–28: Moose Jaw Maroons

The Moose Jaw Maroons were a minor-league ice hockey team in the Prairie Hockey League. Based in Moose Jaw, Saskatchewan, Canada, they existed from 1926 to 1928. In 1926–27, the team was known as the Moose Jaw Warriors before changing its name to the Maroons.

Moose Jaw had previously spent half a season as a member of the PrHL's predecessor, the Western Canada Hockey League in 1922 after the Saskatoon Sheiks moved mid-season to the southern Saskatchewan city. The Sheiks would return to Saskatoon for the next season.

The Maroons were disbanded when the PrHL ceased operations after the 1927–28 season.

== Season-by-season record ==
Note: W = Wins, L = Losses, T = Ties, GF= Goals For, GA = Goals Against, Pts = Points

Season	Team name & League	GP	W	L	T	PTS	GF	GA	Finish	Playoffs
1926–27	Moose Jaw Warriors (PrHL)	32	13	17	2	28	108	117	4th in PrHL
1927–28	Moose Jaw Maroons (PrHL)	26	12	8	6	30	61	61	2nd in PrHL	Lost final

== See also ==
- List of PrHL seasons
- List of ice hockey teams in Saskatchewan
