= Saskatoon Sheiks =

Canadian professional ice hockey team

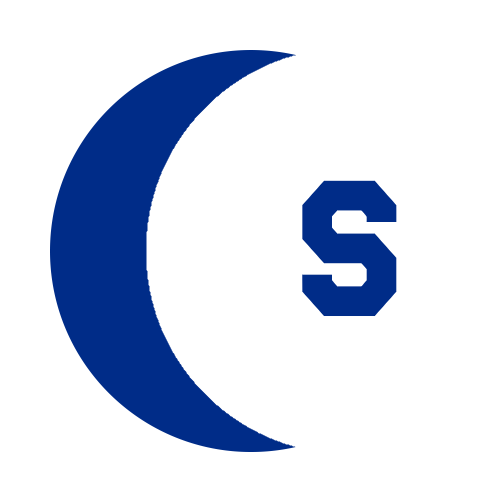
- City: Saskatoon, Saskatchewan
- League: WCHL/WHL (1921–1926); PrHL (1926–1928)
- Operated: 1921–1928
- Home arena: Crescent Arena, Saskatoon
- Colors: Blue, white

Franchise history
- 1921: Saskatoon Sheiks
- 1922: Moose Jaw Sheiks
- 1922–23: Saskatoon Crescents
- 1923–1928: Saskatoon Sheiks

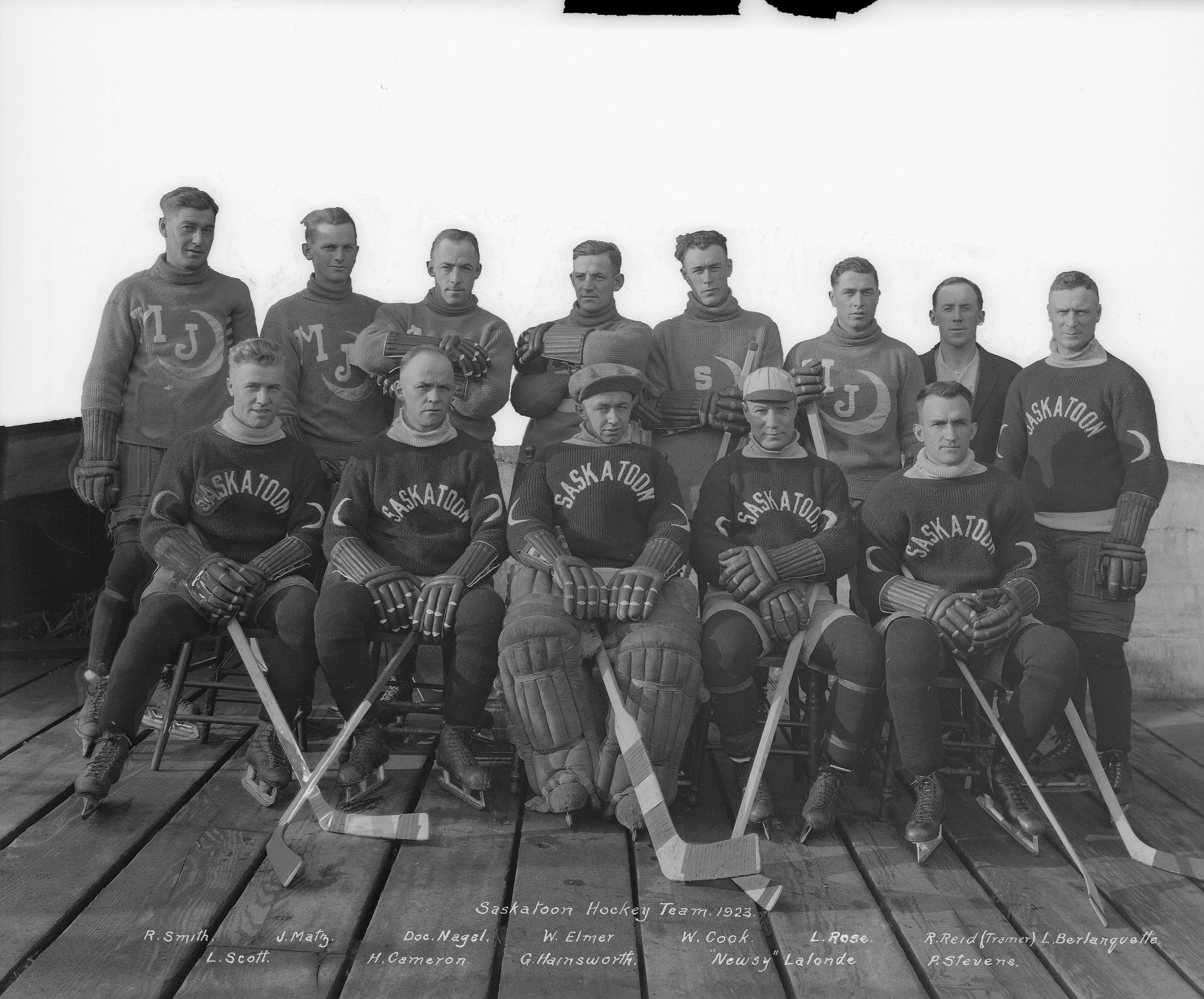
Saskatoon Crescents 1923

The Saskatoon Sheiks, also known as the Saskatoon Crescents, were a professional ice hockey team in the Western Canada Hockey League (WCHL) and Prairie Hockey League (PrHL) from 1921 to 1928. The team played their home games at the Crescent Arena in Saskatoon, Saskatchewan.

== History ==
The Sheiks entered the WCHL in the 1921–22 season with the assistance of its coach, Robert Mitford Pinder. However, financial issues that season forced the club to move to the Moose Jaw Arena and play as the Moose Jaw Sheiks. The Saskatoon Sheiks were originally known as the Crescents, and the name was only changed in 1923, after the team had returned to Saskatoon after being purchased by a group located in Saskatoon.

The team was reorganized as the Saskatoon Crescents Hockey Club in April 1922. Frederick E. Betts was appointed chairman of the team's management committee, made the final decision on player contracts, and had a policy of not making statements to the media until a deal was final. Betts signed ten new players to contracts by November in addition to three players who returned from the previous season. He sought to sign Newsy Lalonde from the Montreal Canadiens, and was willing to buy Lalonde's release pending all other National Hockey League clubs waiving their right to claim him. Betts later agreed to trade the rights to highly touted prospect Aurèle Joliat to bring Lalonde to the Crescents as the team's player-coach for the season. The Crescents won eight of thirty games played, placed fourth during the 1922–23 WCHL season and did not qualify for the playoffs, despite that Lalonde led the league with 30 goals scored.

New ownership took over the team in May 1923. The team continued playing until 1928 when it folded.

== Season-by-season record ==
Note: W = Wins, L = Losses, T = Ties, GF= Goals For, GA = Goals Against, Pts = Points

Season	Team name	League	GP	W	L	T	PTS	GF	GA	Finish	Playoffs
1921–22	Saskatoon Sheiks/Moose Jaw Sheiks	(WCHL)	24	5	19	0	10	67	137	4th in WCHL
1922–23	Saskatoon Crescents	(WCHL)	30	8	20	2	18	91	125	4th in WCHL
1923–24	Saskatoon Sheiks	(WCHL)	30	15	12	3	33	91	73	3rd in WCHL
1924–25	Saskatoon Sheiks	(WCHL)	28	16	11	1	33	102	75	2nd in WCHL	Lost in Semi-finals
1925–26	Saskatoon Sheiks	(WHL)	30	18	11	1	37	93	64	2nd in WHL	Lost in semi-finals
1926–27	Saskatoon Sheiks	(PrHL)	32	14	16	2	30	110	117	2nd in PrHL
1927–28	Saskatoon Sheiks	(PrHL)	28	18	5	5	41	86	39	1st in PrHL

== Head coaches ==
- Bob Pinder (1921–1922)
- Newsy Lalonde (1922–1926)

== Notable players ==
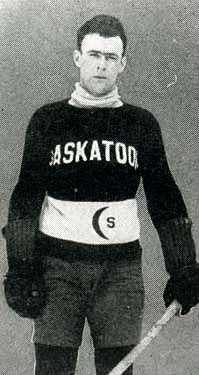
Bill Cook with the Crescents c. 1922 – c. 1923

- Bun Cook
- Bill Cook
- Harry Cameron
- Corbett Denneny
- Tommy Dunderdale
- George Hainsworth
- Newsy Lalonde
- Rube Brandow

== See also ==
- List of pre-NHL seasons
- List of ice hockey teams in Saskatchewan
