= Prairie Hockey League =

- Sport: Ice hockey
- Founded: February 1926
- First season: 1926
- Folded: 1928
- Commissioner: Walter E. Seaborn
- No. of teams: 5
- Country: Canada
- Most titles: Calgary Tigers (1); Saskatoon Sheiks (1)

The Prairie Hockey League (PHL) was a Canadian professional ice hockey league in Alberta and Saskatchewan that was created following the demise of the Western Hockey League in 1926. It operated for two seasons.

The creation of the league was announced in February 1926, with teams in Regina, Moose Jaw, Brandon, and Winnipeg. By the time the first season began, Brandon and Winnipeg had dropped out. Five WHL teams—the Calgary Tigers, Edmonton Eskimos, Saskatoon Sheiks, Regina Capitals, and the Moose Jaw Warriors—played in the league's first season. Leading the PHL was president Walter E. Seaborn of Moose Jaw. In the first season, the Calgary Tigers were declared the league champions when the Saskatoon Sheiks refused to continue their playoff series after complaining about the officiating in the first game. The Tigers won the game 2–1. The Tigers played the Winnipeg Maroons of the American Hockey Association for the Merchants Casualty Cup, presented to the top professional team in the west.

While the PHL was created out of the remains of the WHL, it did not inherit the WHL's right to play the eastern-based National Hockey League for the Stanley Cup. The NHL had acquired the professional rights to most of the WHL's top players and used most of them to stock three expansion teams in the United States. Accordingly, the Stanley Cup trustees considered the PHL to be a minor league, and rejected its attempt to challenge for the Cup. The Stanley Cup has been the de facto NHL championship trophy since, though the NHL would not gain formal control of the Cup until 1947.

At a meeting in May 1927, Seaborn said that he expected all five teams to return for the next season, and that the league might expand into Brandon, Manitoba. But, as it turned out, Calgary and Edmonton dropped out after one year and no new team was admitted to the league. The Moose Jaw team was renamed the Moose Jaw Maroons.

The league folded in 1928 due to low attendance.

== Franchises ==
- Calgary Tigers (1926–27)
- Edmonton Eskimos (1926–27)
- Moose Jaw Warriors (1926–27), (renamed) Moose Jaw Maroons (1927–28)
- Regina Capitals (1926–28)
- Saskatoon Sheiks (1926–28)

== See also ==
- 1926–27 PHL season
- 1927–28 PHL season

== Bibliography ==
- Lowe, Kevin; Fischler, Stan; Fischler, Shirley (1988), Champions: The Making Of The Edmonton Oilers, Scarborough, Ontario: Prentice-Hall, ISBN 0-132-35623-6
