= Benson (surname) =

- Language: English

Origin
- Meaning: "Son of Ben"
- Region of origin: England

Other names
- Variant forms: Benison, Bensone, Bennison, Bennsone, Bennisoun, Bennisone

Benson is a common patronymic surname of English origin meaning "son of Ben" (Benedict, Benjamin, Bennett). Benson is uncommon as a first name, but quite common as a surname in English speaking countries.

Notable people with the name Benson include:

- A. C. Benson (1862–1925), English poet and essayist
- A. V. Benson (1869–1939), South Australian medical doctor and sports enthusiast
- Ada Benson (1840–1882), British headmistress and educationist
- Adolph B. Benson (1881–1961), Swedish-American educator and historian
- Al Benson (1908–1978), American radio DJ, music promoter and record label owner
- Al Benson (basketball), American professional basketball player
- Alexander Benson (1872–1947), American diplomat
- Alfred W. Benson (1843–1916), United States Senator from Kansas
- Allan L. Benson (1871–1940), American journalist and Socialist presidential candidate
- Allen Benson (1908–1999), American professional baseball player
- Amber Benson (born 1977), American actress
- Ambrosius Benson (c. 1495/1500–1550), Italian painter, part of the Northern Renaissance
- Andrew Benson (1917–2015), American chemist
- Anna Benson (born 1976), American model
- Annette Benson (1895–1965), British film actress
- Sir Arthur Benson (1907–1987), British colonial administrator and governor
- Arthur W. Benson (c. 1798–1889), American industrialist and real-estate developer
- Ashley Benson (born 1989), American actress
- Aslag Benson (1855–1937), member of the North Dakota Senate from 1903 to 1906
- Barry W. Benson (c. 1811–1839), secretary of state of Mississippi
- Benny Benson (1913–1972), creator of Alaska's state flag
- Bernadette Benson, Canadian born athlete specialising in ultra distance events
- Bernard Benson (1922–1996), British inventor, author of The Peace Book
- Bertil W. Benson (1843–1907), Norwegian-born American politician in North Dakota
- Bill Benson (rugby league) (1893–1968), Australian rugby league player
- Bob Benson (footballer) (1883–1916), English professional footballer
- Bobby Benson (1922–1983), Nigerian entertainer and musician who influenced the Nigerian music scene
- Brad Benson (born 1955), American football player
- Brendan Benson (born 1970), American musician
- Breanne Benson (born 1984), Albanian pornographic actress
- Bruce Benson (disambiguation), several people
- Bryan Benson, Governor of the Bank of England from 1735 to 1737
- C. Irving Benson (1897–1980), Australian Methodist minister
- Carl Benson, pseudonym of American writer Charles Astor Bristed (1820–1874)
- Carla L. Benson, American vocalist, most known for her recorded background vocals
- Carville Benson (1872–1929), American politician
- Catherine Benson (born 1992), American rugby union player
- Catherine Brewer Benson (1822–1908), one of the earliest women to earn a college bachelor's degree in the U.S.
- Cedric Benson (1982–2019), American football player for the Green Bay Packers
- Charles Benson (born 1960), American professional football defensive end
- Chima Simone Benson (born 1982), American TV personality and freelance journalist
- Christopher Benson (businessman) (1933–2024), British company director and chairman of public bodies
- Christopher Benson (theologian) (1788–1868), Cambridge educated theologian
- Claus Benson (1889-?), American basketball player
- Cliff Benson (born 1961), American football tight end
- Connie Benson (1889–1969), Canadian professional ice hockey player
- Constance Benson (1864–1946), British stage and film actress
- Constantine Walter Benson (1909–1982), British ornithologist
- Craig Benson (born 1954), American businessman and politician
- Craig Benson (swimmer) (born 1994), Scottish double Olympian (London 2012 and Rio 2016)
- David Benson-Pope (born 1950), New Zealand politician
- Dee Benson (1948–2020), American judge
- Doug Benson (born 1962), American comedian and actor
- Duane Benson (1945–2019), American football player and politician
- E. F. Benson (Edward Frederic Benson, 1867–1940), English novelist
- Edgar Benson (1923–2011), Canadian politician
- Edward White Benson (1829–1896), Archbishop of Canterbury
- Edwin Benson (1931–2016), American educator
- Egbert Benson (1746–1833), American politician and jurist
- Elizabeth English Benson (1904–1972), American educator
- Elmer Austin Benson (1895–1985), American politician
- Eva Benson (1875–1949), Australian artist
- Ezra Taft Benson (1899–1994), American politician and the 13th President of The Church of Jesus Christ of Latter-day Saints
- Frank Benson (disambiguation), several people
- Fred Benson (born 1994), Dutch-Ghanaian footballer
- Gayle Benson (born 1947), American businesswoman and sports team owner
- George Benson (disambiguation), several people
- Gordon Benson (born 1994), British triathlete
- Harry Benson (disambiguation), several people
- Herbert Benson (1935–2022), American physician
- Henry N. Benson (1872–1960), American politician
- Herbert Benson (1935–2022), American cardiologist and Harvard professor, author of The Relaxation Response
- Howard Benson (born 1956), American music producer
- Irving Benson (1914–2016), American actor and vaudeville comedian
- Ivy Benson (1913–1993), British bandleader
- James Benson (disambiguation), several people
- Jane Benson, contemporary English artist
- Jessica Benson (born 1988), American singer
- Jo Jo Benson (1938–2014), real name Joseph M. Hewell, American R&B singer
- Joan Benson (1925–2020), American keyboard player
- Joanne Benson (born 1943), American politician
- Jocelyn Benson (born 1977), American academic and politician
- Jodi Benson (born 1961), American voice actress and singer
- John Benson (disambiguation), several people
- Julian Benson (1971–2025), Australian-born Irish choreographer
- Kahlil Benson (born 2002), American football player
- Karl Benson (born 1951), American college sports administrator
- Kent Benson (born 1954), American basketball player
- Kris Benson (born 1974), American baseball player
- Laura Benson, British actress
- Lee Benson, American sports writer
- Louisa Benson Craig (1941–2010), Burmese beauty pageant winner and rebel leader
- Margaret Benson (1865–1916), English author and amateur Egyptologist
- Margaret Jane Benson (1859–1936), British botanist and scholar
- Mark Benson (engineer), German-born inventor of the Benson boiler
- Mark Benson (born 1958), English cricketer
- Martin Benson (actor) (1918–2010), British actor
- Martin Benson (bishop) (1689–1752), English churchman, Archdeacon of Berkshire and Bishop of Gloucester
- Mary Benson (hostess) (1841–1918), English hostess
- Mary Benson (campaigner) (1919–2000), South African writer and anti-apartheid activist
- Michael Benson (disambiguation), several people
- Mildred Benson (1905–2002), American writer
- Mykel Benson (born 1987), American football player
- Nicholas John Benson (born 1961), Ghanaian-American soldier, lawyer, businessman, writer
- Nicholas Benson (born 1964), American stone carver
- Nigel Benson (born 1955), British author and illustrator
- Ole E. Benson (1866–1952), American politician
- Pat Benson, American actress, known for Tequila and Bonetti
- Patricia Benson (1941–2024), American artist
- Perry Benson (born 1961), English actor
- Ray Benson (born 1951), American actor and composer
- Raymond Benson (born 1955), American author
- Renaldo Benson ("Obie" Benson, 1936–2005), American soul and R&B singer and songwriter
- Rex Benson (merchant banker) (1889–1968), English merchant banker and army officer
- Rhian Benson (born 1977), Ghanaian singer
- Richard Benson (musician) (1955–2022), English-Italian guitarist
- Richard Meux Benson (1824–1915), Anglican clergyman and founder of religious order
- Rita Romilly Benson (1900–1980), American actress and acting teacher
- Robert Benson (disambiguation), several people
- Ron Benson (1925–1997), English professional footballer
- Sally Benson (1897–1972), American screenwriter
- Sally Benson (professor), professor of energy engineering at Stanford University
- Sam Benson (1909–1995), Australian politician
- Samuel P. Benson (1804–1876), United States Representative from Maine
- Seve Benson (born 1986), English professional golfer
- Shaun Benson (born 1976), Canadian actor
- Shebin Benson (born 1995), Indian film actor from the Malayalam film industry
- Sheila Benson, American journalist and film critic
- Sheri Benson, Canadian politician
- Simon Benson (1851–1942), Norwegian-born American logging entrepreneur and philanthropist
- Stella Benson (1892–1933), English feminist, novelist, poet, and travel writer
- Stephanie Benson, UK based Ghanaian singer and performer
- Stephen Allen Benson (1816–1865), President of Liberia 1856–1864
- Steve Benson (disambiguation), several people
- Susan Porter Benson (1943–2005), American historian
- T. D. Benson (1857–1926), British socialist activist
- T. O. S. Benson (1917–2008), Nigerian lawyer
- Taylor Benson (1922–1996), member of the Wisconsin State Senate
- Teco Benson, Nigerian film director and producer
- Thor Benson (born 1990), independent journalist
- Tiger Benson (born 1984), British pornographic actress of Japanese descent
- Tom Benson (disambiguation), several people
- Tony Benson (athlete) (born 1942), Australian long-distance runner
- Tony Benson (rugby league) (born 1965), New Zealand rugby league coach
- Trent Benson (born 1971), South Korean-born American murderer
- Trinity Benson (born 1997), American football player
- Troy Benson (born 1963), professional American football player
- Trudy Benson (born 1985), American artist
- Vern Benson (1924–2014), American baseball player
- Violet Benson (online alias Daddy Issues), Russian-born American Internet personality
- Warren Benson (1924–2005), American composer and timpanist
- Wayne Benson, American mandolinist and songwriter in the bluegrass tradition
- Wendy Benson (born 1971), American actress seen in many television shows
- Will Benson (born 1998), American baseball player
- William Benson (disambiguation), several people
- Zach Benson (born 2005), Canadian ice hockey player

== Fictional characters ==
- Carly Corinthos (née Benson), role played by Sarah Joy Brown and Laura Wright in American soap opera General Hospital
- Cynthia Benson, a character in the 1988 American film Big
- Freddie Benson, role played by Nathan Kress in American TV sitcom iCarly
- Kurt Benson, character in British soap opera Hollyoaks
- Olivia Benson, character in American police drama Law & Order: Special Victims Unit, played by Mariska Hargitay
- Benson, brother-in-law of Deputy Arthel Queen in the novel Deliverance
- Jamesir Bensonmum, character played by Sir Alec Guinness in the 1976 comedy film Murder by Death
- Zoe Benson, character played by Taissa Farmiga in American Horror Story: Coven
- Barry B. Benson, Bee protagonist played by Jerry Seinfeld in Bee Movie
- Benson Dunwoody, a main character in the animated television series Regular Show
- Benson, one of two main protagonists in the novel Memorial by Bryan Washington

== See also ==
- Benton (surname)
- Bernson, surname
- Benson family tree showing the relationship between some of the above
- Bason
- Beson
