= William Benson =

William, Willem, Will, or Bill Benson may refer to:

== Sports ==
- Bill Benson (rugby league) (1893–1968), Australian rugby league player
- Bill Benson (ice hockey) (1920–2012), Canadian ice hockey centreman
- William Benson (swimmer) (born 1987), New Zealand swimmer
- Will Benson (born 1998), American baseball player

== Others ==
- William Arthur Smith Benson (1854–1924), English designer.
- William Benson (abbot) (died 1549), English Benedictine
- Willem Benson (1521–1574), Flemish Renaissance painter
- William Benson (architect) (1682–1754), British amateur architect and political figure
- William E. Benson (1873–1915), African-American businessman and educator
- William Henry Benson (1803–1870), British amateur malacologist
- William Noel Benson (1885–1957), Australian/New Zealand geologist
- William Ralganal Benson (1862–1937), Native American basket maker
- William S. Benson (1855–1932), American admiral
- William Sol Benson (1877–1945), American esperantist, author of Benson's Universal Method for Esperanto's (self-)teaching
- William Thomas Benson (1824–1885), Canadian entrepreneur and politician
- William John Chapman Benson (c. 1818–1850), British-born trader in Canada

== See also ==
- William Bentsen (1930–2020), American Olympic sailor
