= Bason =

Bason is a surname. Notable people with the surname include:

- Brian Bason (born 1955), English football player
- Fred Bason (1907–1973), English bookseller
- John Bason (born 1957), English businessman
- Noel Galea Bason (1955–2026), Maltese sculptor and medalist
- Samuel Bason (1894–1986), American banker and politician

== See also ==
- Beson
- Benson (surname)
