= Master of the Female Half-Lengths =

Flemish painter

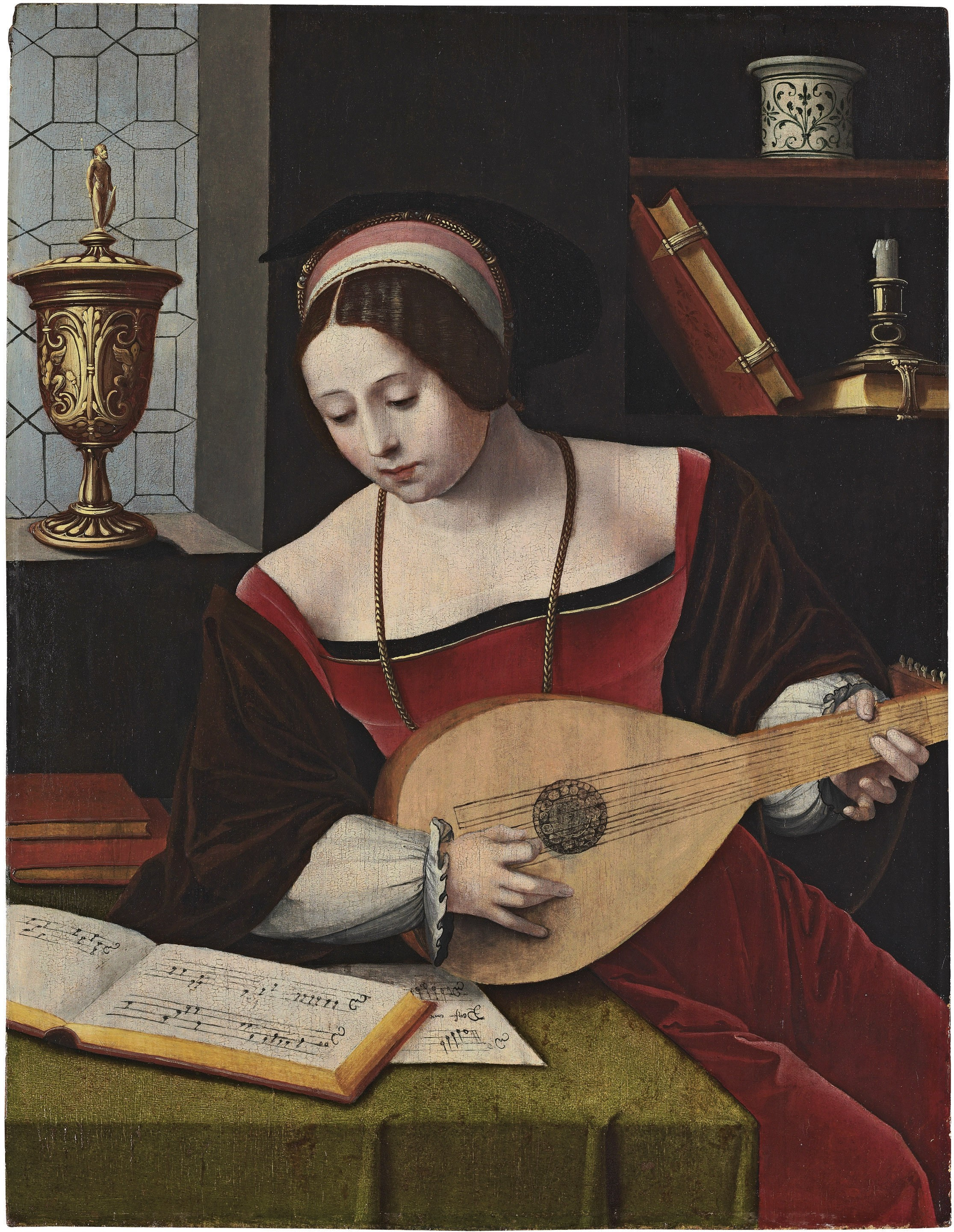
A lady playing a lute in an interior

The Master of the Female Half-Lengths (sometimes referred to as Master of the Half-Lengths) is the notname given to a painter, or more likely a group of painters of a workshop, active in the Low Countries in the early sixteenth century. The name was given in the 19th century to identify the maker or makers of a body of work consisting of 67 paintings to which since 40 more have been added. The Master created female figures in genre scenes, small religious and mythological works, landscapes and portraits.

== Identification of the oeuvre ==
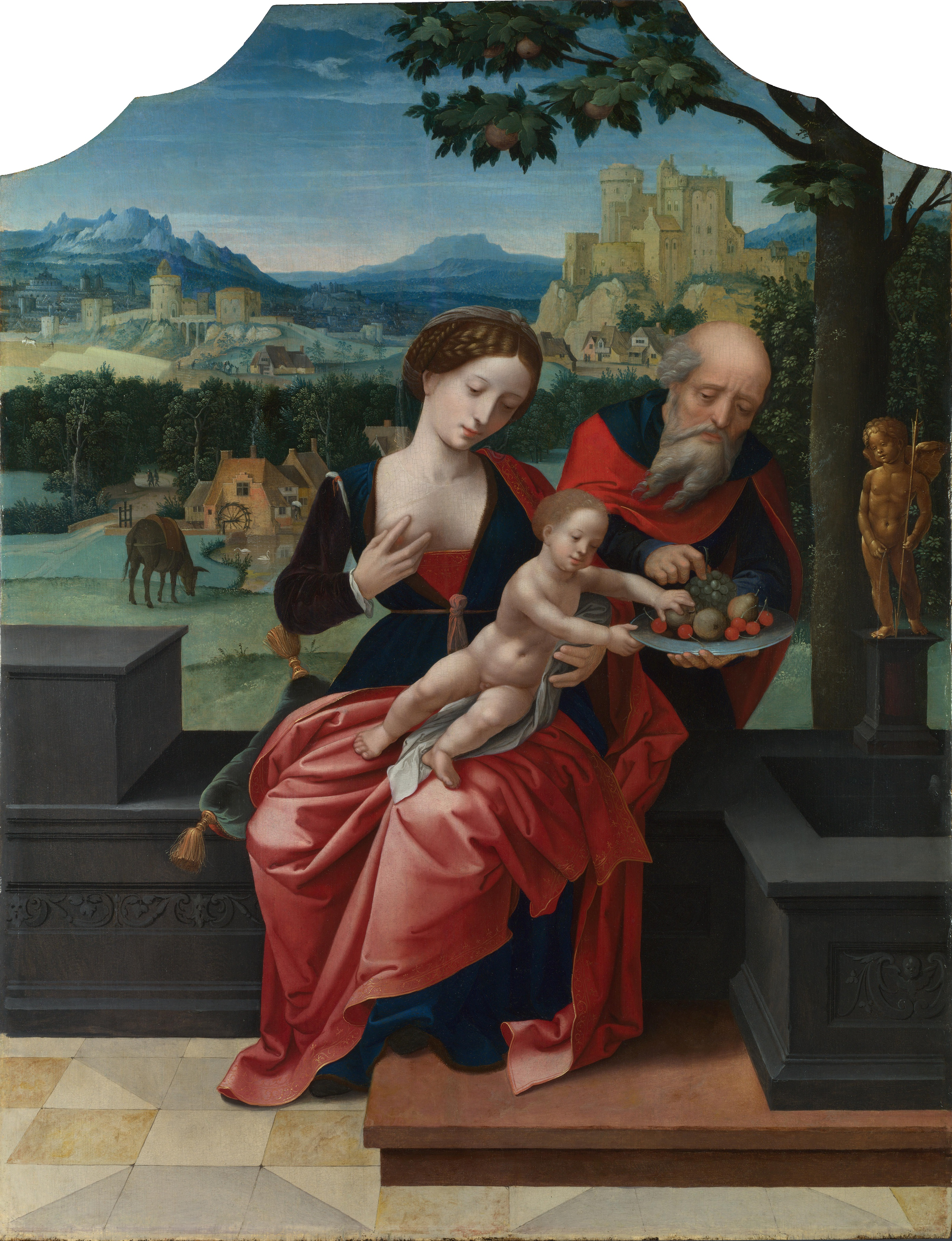
Rest on the flight into Egypt

The works attributed to the Master of the Female Half-Lengths were apparently the product of a large workshop that specialized in small-scale panels depicting aristocratic young ladies at half-length. The ladies are shown engaging in various activities such as reading, writing, or playing musical instruments. The women all share the same heart-shaped face and gentle demeanor. The expressions of the female figures are characterised by their sweetness and grace. The Master clearly expressed the high artistic and moral humanistic values of the Northern Renaissance in these works . The figures are typically placed in a wood-panelled interior or against a neutral background. Some of the women are represented with an ointment jar, the attribute of Mary Magdalene.

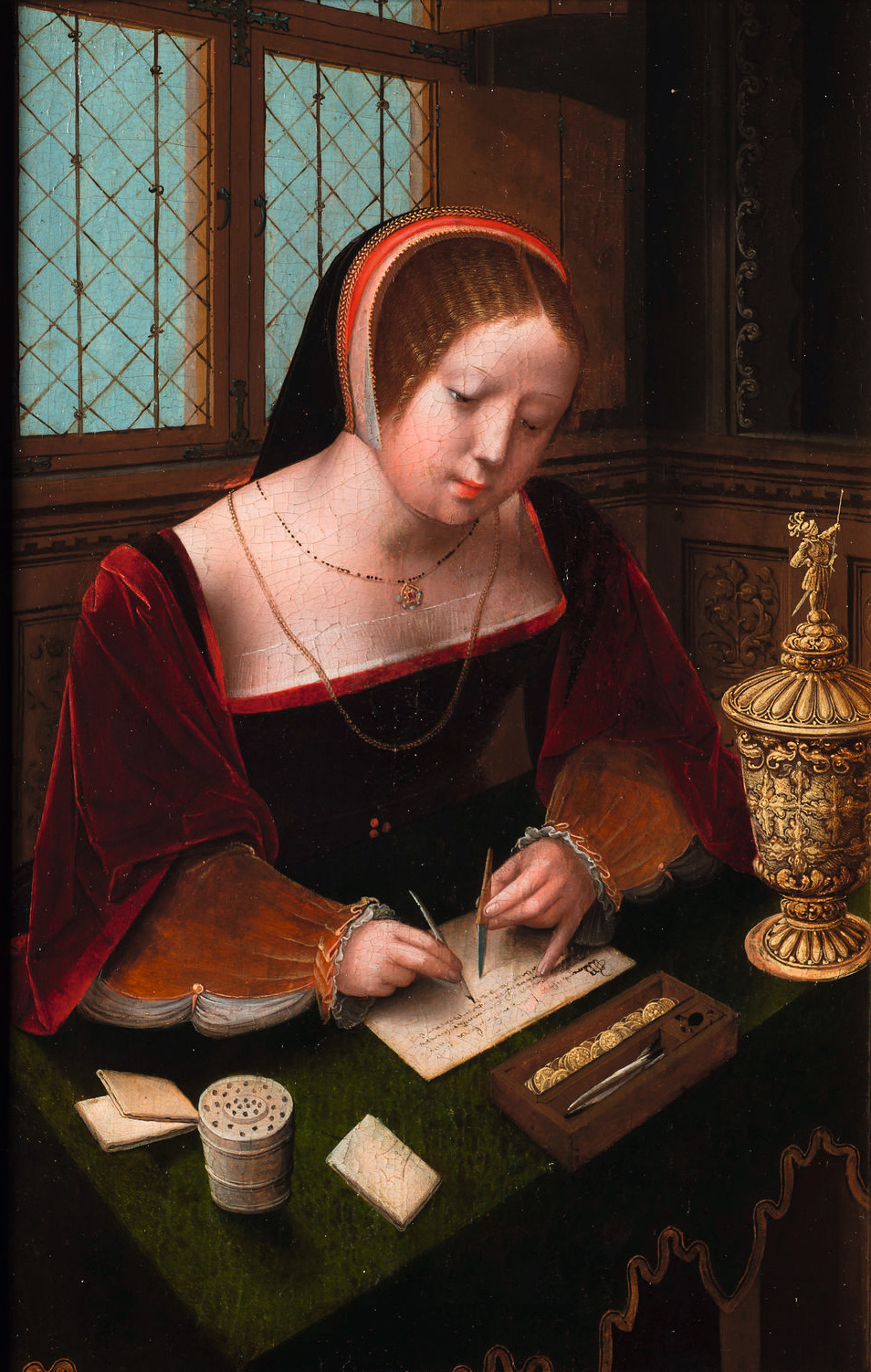
Lady writing at a desk

A few paintings of mythological subjects and copies of standardized compositions such as the Crucifixion, the Deposition, the Virgin of Sorrows, St Jerome and Lucretia are also attributed to the Master. These religious paintings are characterised by the prominence of the landscape settings and the small figures. The workshop nature of the production of these paintings as shown in the repetition of motifs and compositions and the lack of indications of their patronage or destination point, a production aimed mainly at the open market and export. A few portrait paintings have also been attributed to the artist.

== Identification of the artist ==
There is no agreement on the Master's identity and the place and period of their activity. Antwerp, Bruges, Ghent, Mechelen and the French court have been proposed for the location of their workshop. Estimates for their period of activity vary from the early to the late 16th century. Generally, it is believed the Master was active in the early 16th century. The art historian Otto Benesch proposed an identification with the Bruges artist named Jan or Hans Vereycke. This identification has not found universal support among art historians.

Some art historians have argued that the artist must have worked in Antwerp or Mechelen in the 1520s and 1530s since the landscapes of the Master are close to those of Joachim Patinir and the female types resemble those of Bernard van Orley. Certain similarities between the Master's work and that of the Bruges artists Ambrosius Benson and Adriaen Isenbrant have also been observed. While the Master's figures show an affinity with those of Isenbrant who worked in Bruges, the Master is more likely to have been active in Antwerp. The reasons are that they seem to have worked mainly for the export trade for which Antwerp was then the principal hub in Flanders and that their landscapes relied on the landscapes of Joachim Patinir. A similarity between the figures of the Master and those of another anonymous painter active in Antwerp referred to as the Master with the Parrot has also been noted.
