= Master with the Parrot =

Flemish group of painters

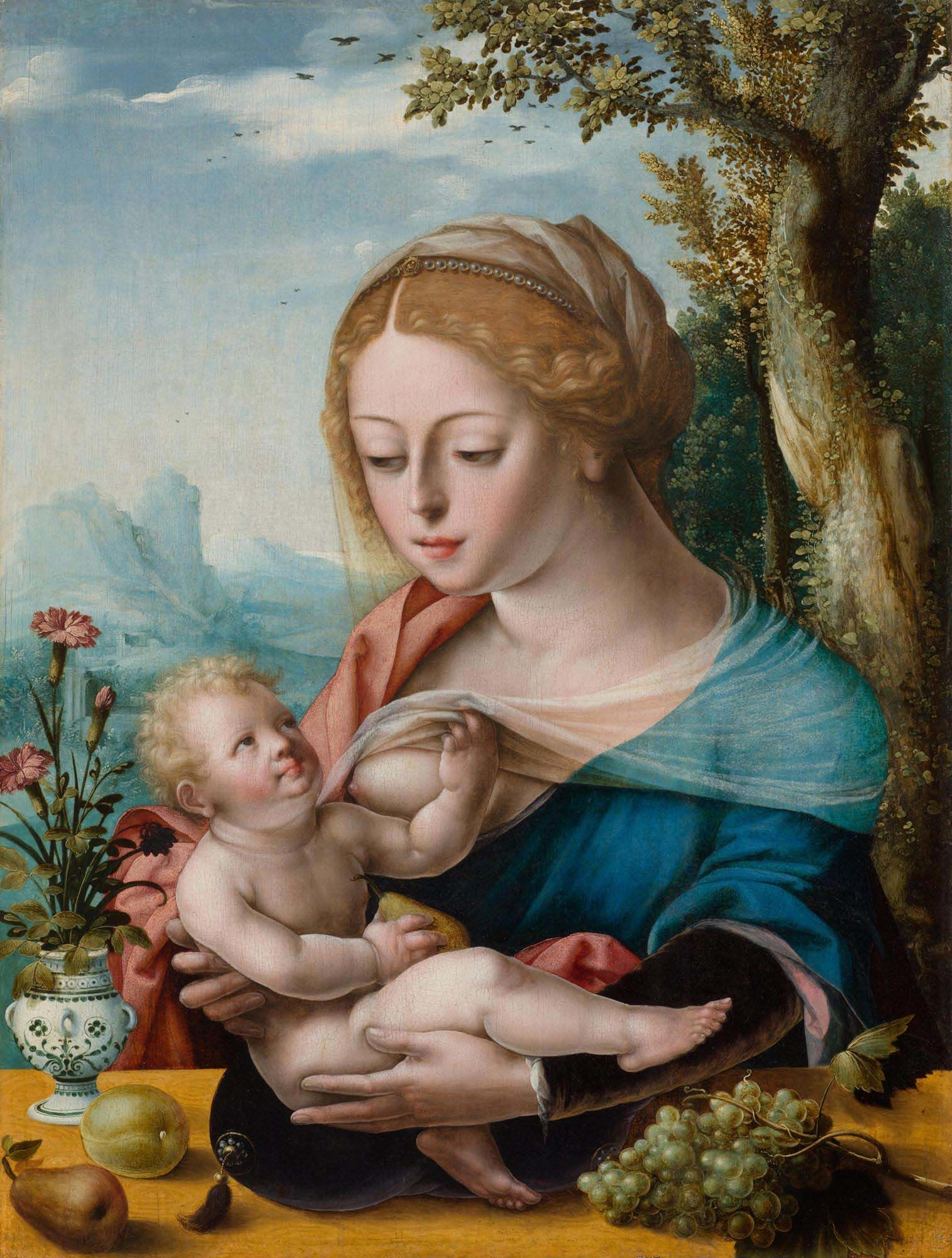
Virgin and Child

The Master with the Parrot or Master of the Parrot (fl. between 1520 and 1540) is the notname given to a group of Flemish painters who likely worked in a workshop in Antwerp in the first half of the 16th century. They produced devotional pictures for the local bourgeoisie in a style reminiscent of contemporary Flemish painters working in an Italianate style.

== Discovery and background ==
The scholar of Flemish painting Max Friedländer was the first to group a set of 15 homogenous works and attribute them to an unknown artist whom he gave the notname 'Der Meister mit dem Papagei' ('Master with the Parrot') in an article, which appeared in 1948–49. Friedlander gave the name because the common factor of the works he gave to the painter was their depiction of the Virgin with the Christ child often together with an idiosyncratic, exotic bird.

Gradually more works were assigned to this master until there were about 100 works. Later research led to a new hypothesis about the attribution of the body of work: rather than a single individual painter, it is now surmised that because of the differences in style the works were the product of a workshop with several artists.

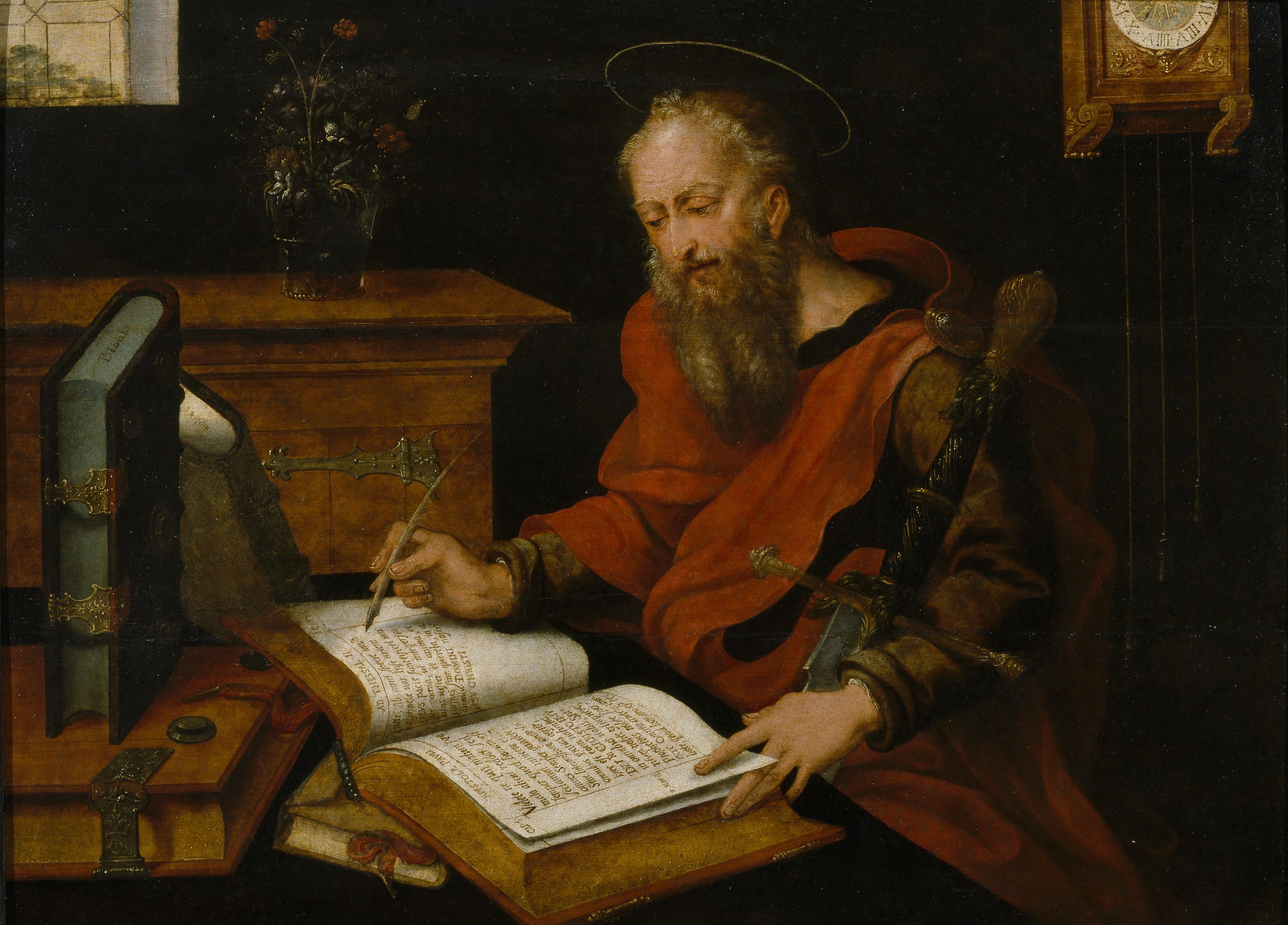
St Luke writing

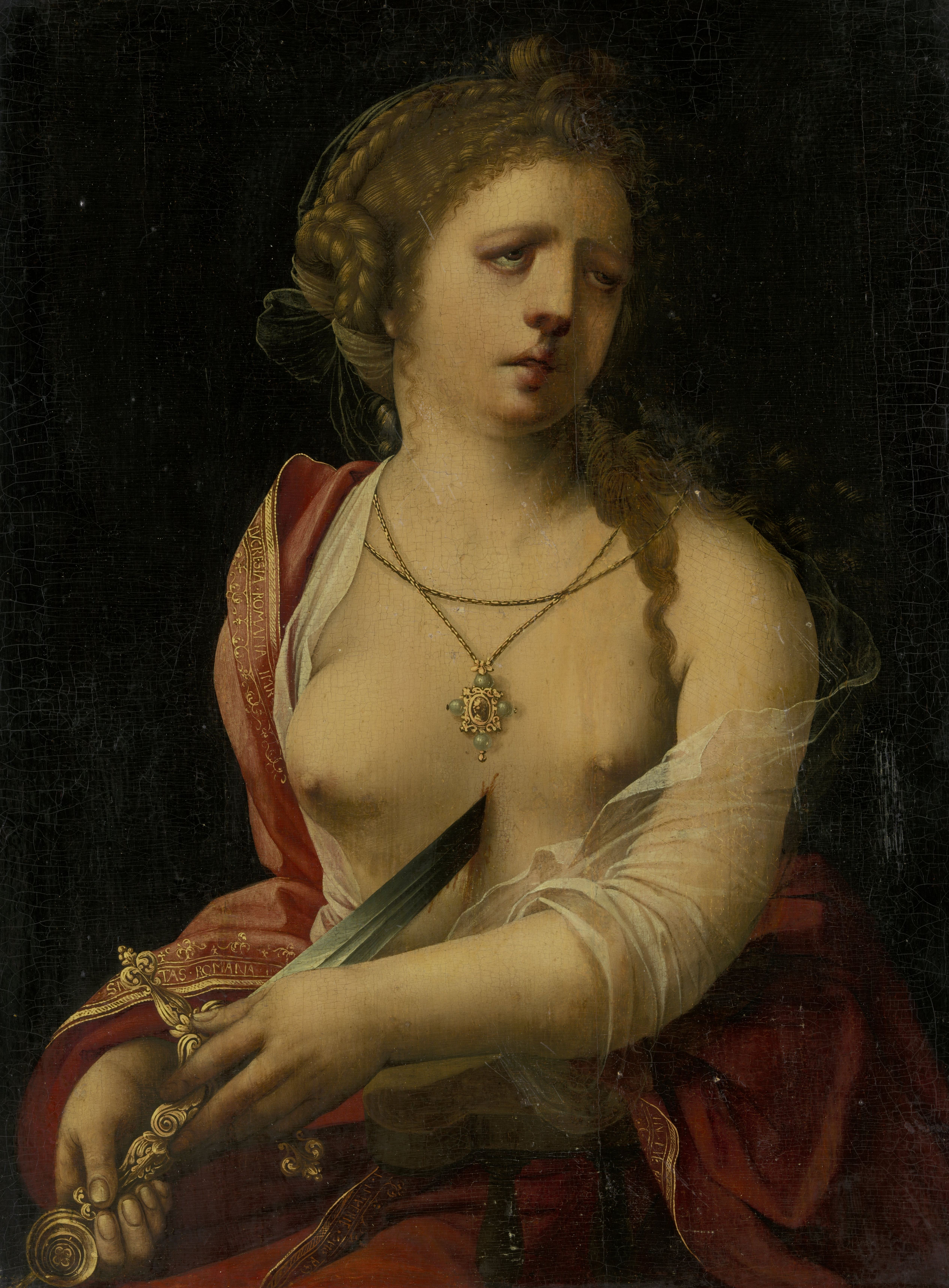
Suicide of Lucretia

There is no certainty about the exact period during which the Master with the Parrot was active. It must have been in the first half of the 16th century and probably during the 1520s and 1530s. It is generally believed that the workshop was based in Antwerp but it is possible it was in fact located in Bruges.

== Work ==
Most of the works attributed to the Master with the Parrot are portraits and religious compositions, especially of the Virgin with Child, playing with a parrot, as well as of Mary Magdalene and the suicide of Lucretia. Despite the uneven quality of the paintings attributed to the Master, a core body of work of a high quality has been assigned to him, which is distinguished by its uniform style and recurring motifs. The core work in this oeuvre is the Virgin and Child feeding a Parrot in the San Diego Museum of Art. The figures in the compositions are characterized by features such as long fingers and oval nails, a broad face and thin nose. These features are in line with the Mannerist taste for elegant body proportions that surpass reality.

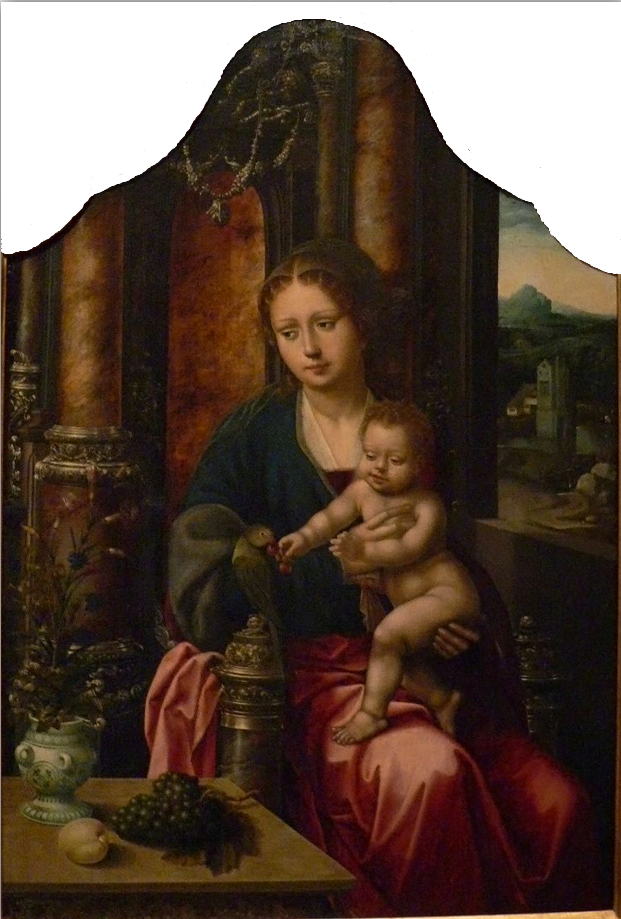
Virgin and Child feeding a Parrot

The Master of the Parrot's paintings betray the influence of the Italianate artists of the generation following Quentin Matsys and Bernard van Orley who worked in the Southern Netherlands. Similarities with the oeuvre of Pieter Coecke van Aelst are particularly apparent. Among the most distinguished Flemish painters of the 16th century, Pieter Coecke van Aelst became a master in Antwerp's Guild of Saint Luke in 1527 and maintained a large and productive workshop. It is likely the Master of the Parrot began his career in van Coecke's workshop. In fact, many of the works now given to the Master of the Parrot were formerly attributed to that artist.

The Master with the Parrot's paintings betray also the influence of the Romanist artists active in the region such as Joos van Cleve, Ambrosius Benson and Jan Gossaert. From Gossaert, the Master with the Parrot took the inspiration for various compositions of the Holy Family and the sculptural aspect of his figures. This is particularly clear in the Virgin and Child (Auctioned at Koller Zürich, 2014-09-15 - 2014-09-20, lot 3008). The closeness to Benson indicates that the Master's workshop may have maintained contacts with the Bruges school of painting. From Joos van Cleve, the Master borrowed the compositional scheme of placing the Virgin in an elaborate landscape with still life elements. He also used a sfumato technique reminiscent of Leonardo da Vinci, which attests to the enduring Itailianate influence on his work.

The Master's style also bears similarities to the works of the Master of the Female Half-Lengths and his works have in the past been attributed to that Master.

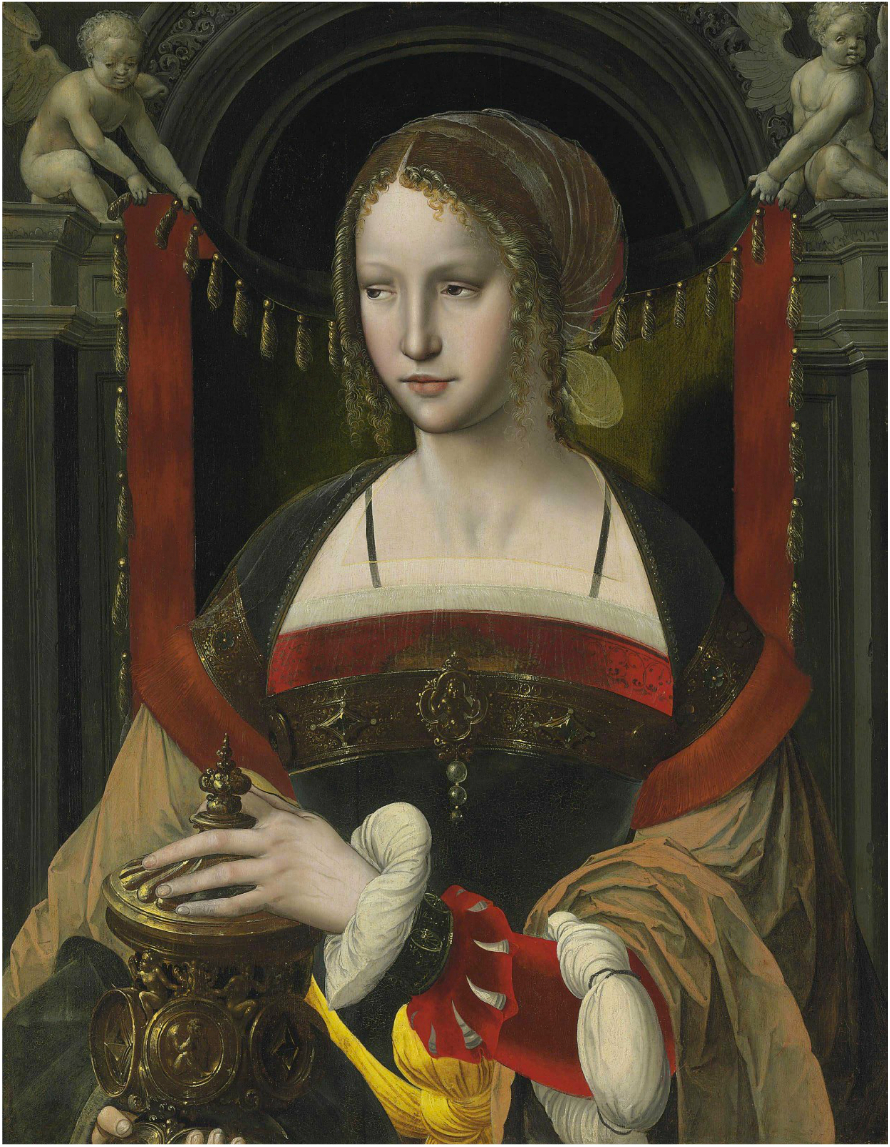
St Mary Magdalene before a curtain supported by angels in an architectural niche

Many of the Master with the Parrot's works were made for the export market, and given the then existing trade and political ties with Spain, many of them ended up in Spain. Many of the compositions are still found in Spanish collections such as the Prado, the Museum of Fine Arts of Seville and the Bilbao Fine Arts Museum and various private collections.
