= Bason (disambiguation) =

Bason (馬 孫 Mǎsūn or Ma3 Sun1) is a fictional character in the anime and manga Shaman King.

Bason may also refer to:

- Bason, any of the two pans of the balance scale
- Bason, an obsolete word for basin
- Bason is the name of a flame-retardant [2028-52-6]

People

- Brian Bason, a professional footballer (soccer player)
