= Bernson =

Bernson is a surname. Notable people with the surname include:

- Jon Bernson, American singer and songwriter
- Hal Bernson (1930–2020), American clothier
- Reysa Bernson (1904–1944), French astronomer
- Sigrid Bernson (born 1988), Swedish singer and dancer
- Stanley Bernson (born 1936), American murderer

== See also ==
- Benson (surname)
