= Bruce Benson =

Bruce Benson may refer to:

- Bruce B. Benson (1922–1990), American physicist
- Bruce L. Benson (born 1949), American academic economist
- Bruce D. Benson (born 1938), former president of the University of Colorado System
- Bruce Ellis Benson (born 1960), American philosopher
