= Jane Benson =

British multidisciplinary artist

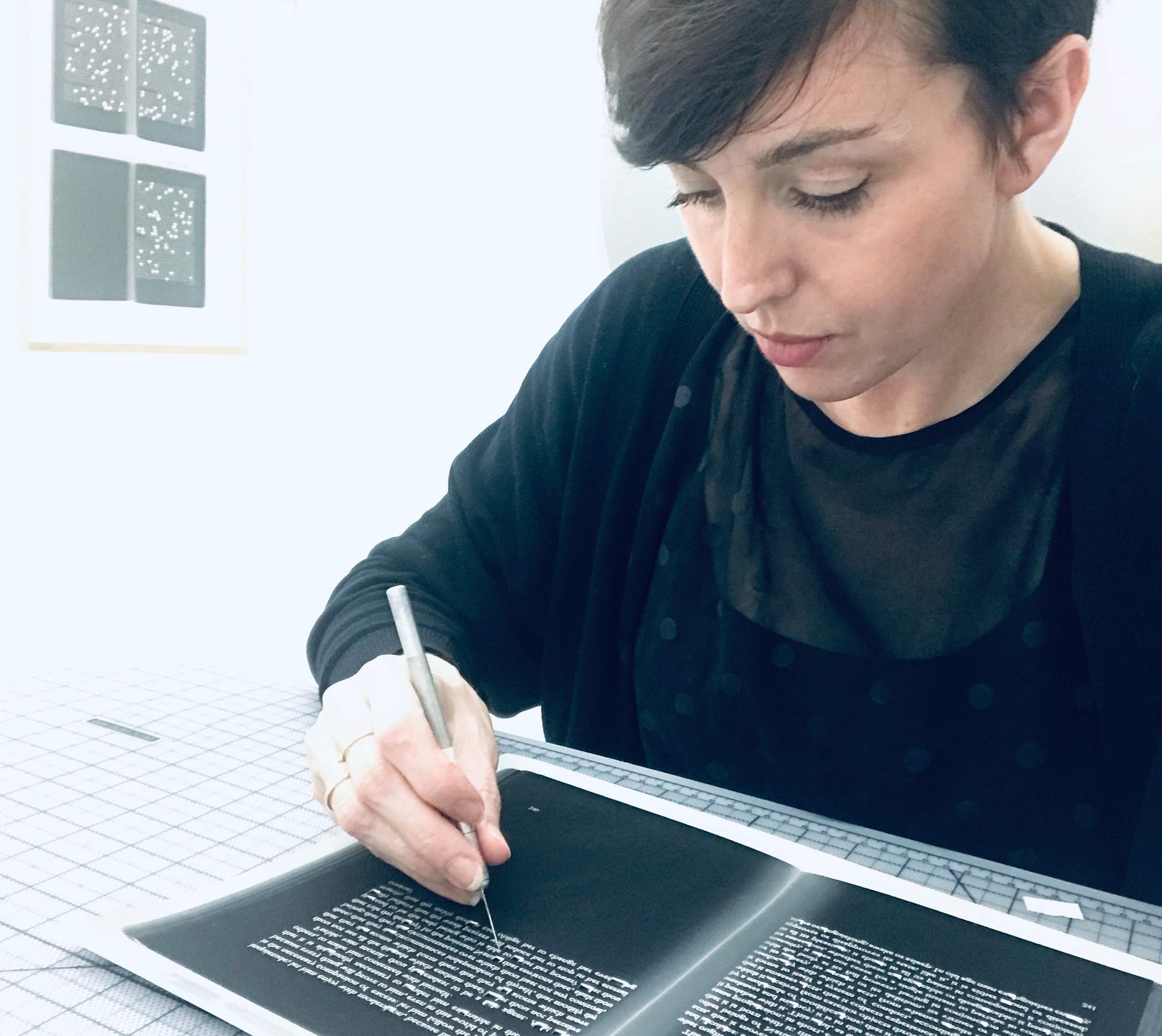
- Benson in the studio
- Born: Thornbury, United Kingdom
- Education: Edinburgh College of Art (BA), School of the Art Institute of Chicago (MFA)
- Known for: Conceptual art, sculpture, sound art, digital media and print, Installation, geopolitical art
- Notable work: Half-Truths, Contemporary Art Center, CAC Cincinnati (Survey exhibition); Faux Faux (Lobby Life), Tang Teaching Museum, Saratoga Springs, NY; The End of The Patriarchal System, LMAK, New York, NY; The Splits, Henry Street Settlement: Abrons Arts Center, New York, NY; Happy Faux Flora, World Financial Center Arts and Events, and Lower Manhattan Cultural Council (Re-opening of the Winter Garden Atrium and world Financial Center after 9/11), New York, NY
- Awards: Fulbright Scholarship, Pollock-Krasner Grant
- Website: www.janebenson.net

Jane Benson is a British multidisciplinary artist. She is known for her immersive geopolitical and research based practice that spans across sculpture, installation, sound, video, institutional critique and collaborations with musicians.

== Early life and education ==
Jane Benson was born in Thornbury, England. She earned a BA (Honors) from Edinburgh College of Art, receiving the Watt Club Medal, Heriot Watt University's Premier Award and the John Watson Award from The Scottish National Gallery of Modern Art. Benson later graduated from the School of the Art Institute of Chicago with an MFA. She received a Fulbright Scholarship to do research in Chicago and later moved to New York where she lives and works. Benson teaches at Cornell University in the Department of Art.

== Artwork ==
Jane Benson's art resists categorization with complex works that are politically embodied and disrupt archetypal structures. Her oeuvre includes sculpture, digital media, print, sound, installation and collaborations with musicians. She fractures and skews conventional structures, relying on subversions of beauty and classical forms of categorization to create poignant re-assemblies from pieces of preexisting objects and ideas. Acts of destruction are often Benson's initial gestures when it comes to destabilizing how the everyday is redefined. She heavily utilizes the action of cutting, in order to reduce cultural standards to fragments of themselves. For example, she shreds flags, bifurcates string instruments and cuts out text from books. Destruction and repurposing of preexisting forms becomes an entry point for additional meanings and understandings, which according to arts writer and curator, Barbara MacAdam, "creates infinite possibilities for new compositions, leaving the reader to fill in the blanks, and setting a rhythm for reading and interpreting—and perhaps suggesting a revised history."

== Exhibitions and public projects ==
Benson's first one-person survey exhibition was held at the Contemporary Art Center, Cincinnati in 2017.

She has exhibited her work extensively in both national and international art venues including: MoMA PS1, New York City; Contemporary Art Center, Cincinnati; Kunstmuseum Bonn, Bonn, Germany; the Tang Teaching Museum, Saratoga Springs, New York; Henry Street Settlement: Abrons Art Center, New York;SculptureCenter, New York; The 8th Floor, New York; Aldrich Contemporary Art Museum, Ridgefield, Connecticut; the Institute of Contemporary Art, Philadelphia; the Scottish National Gallery of Modern Art, Edinburgh, the San Jose Museum of Art and Boca Raton Museum of Art.

In 2011, Benson was commissioned by the New York City Department of Cultural Affairs' Percent for Art program, to make a permanent artwork. The artwork, Mirror Globe (Mapping the New World), is an installation of a re-imagined world map that is located outside of the auditorium of Maspeth High School in Queens, New York. The installation is made from 30,000 mosaic mirrors that reflect both the indoor and outdoor environments and capture images of the people who walk by.

== Honors and press ==
Benson received a Fulbright Scholarship to travel and research in Chicago from 1995 to 1997.

She was awarded a Pollock-Krasner Foundation Grant in 2005 and a Puffin Foundation grant in 2012. She has received artist fellowships and residencies from Socrates Sculpture Park, the Lower Manhattan Cultural Council, Atlantic Center for the Arts and Artists Alliance Inc.

In October 2019, Benson's work, Toothache, was acquired by the Manchester Art Gallery.

In May 2019, Benson's work, The End of The Patriarchal System, was featured on the cover of The Brooklyn Rail. Her artwork has been featured and reviewed in publications such as the New York Times, the New Yorker, Artforum, BOMB Magazine, ARTnews, Art in America, Time Out New York, Monopol and Kunstforum.

Benson's first monograph, Jane Benson: A Place for Infinite Tuning, was published by the Cincinnati Contemporary Art Center and Skira in 2019.
