= Tom Benson (disambiguation) =

Tom Benson (1927–2018) was the owner of the New Orleans Saints and New Orleans Pelicans.

Thomas or Tom Benson may also refer to:

- Thomas Benson (American football) (born 1961), former American football linebacker
- Tom Benson (politician) (1929–2000), Unionist politician in Northern Ireland
- Thomas Benson (1708–1772), British ship-owner, merchant and politician
- Thomas Benson (priest) (1654–1715), Anglican priest in Ireland
- T. D. Benson (Thomas Duckworth Benson, 1857–1926), British socialist politician
- Tom Benson, a character in 7th Cavalry

== See also ==
- William Thomas Benson (1824–1885), Canadian politician
