= John Benson =

John Benson may refer to:

== Arts and entertainment ==
- John Benson (publisher) (died 1667), English publisher of Shakespeare's works
- John Benson (architect) (1812–1874), Irish architect
- John Prentiss Benson (1865–1947), American artist
- John Howard Benson (1901–1956), American calligrapher and stonecarver
- John Benson (artisan) (1939–2024), American calligrapher and stonecarver, designer of the typeface Alexa

== Sports ==
- John Benson (footballer, born 1942) (1942–2010), Scottish footballer
- John Benson (tennis) (born 1959), American tennis player
- Johnny Benson Jr. (born 1963), American racing driver
- John Benson (footballer, born 1991), Ghanaian footballer

== Others ==
- John Benson (clockmaker) (died 1798), English clockmaker
- John Robinson Benson (1836–1885), Australian politician in Queensland
- John Ernest Benson (1911–1989), Australian engineer and researcher
- John T. Benson (born 1937), American educator
- John Benson (Minnesota politician) (born 1943), American politician, member of the Minnesota House of Representatives
- John Benson (Vermont politician) American politician, member of the Republican Party from Brookfield, Vermont

== See also ==
- John Benson Brooks (1917–1999), American jazz pianist, songwriter and composer
