= Robert Benson =

Robert, Rob, Robby, Robbie, Bob, or Bobby Benson may refer to:

== Arts and entertainment ==
- Robert Benson (actor) (1765–1796), British actor
- Bobby Benson (1922–1983), Nigerian musician
- Robby Benson (born 1956), American actor
- Bob Benson (Mad Men) (fl. 2007–2015), character on the TV series Mad Men played by James Wolk
- Rob Benson, British musician, singer for Mickey Finn's T-Rex
- Sir Frank Robert Benson, (1858–1939), British actor-manager

== Politics and law ==
- Robert Benson, 1st Baron Bingley (1676–1731), English politician
- Robert Benson (New York) (1739–1823), American politician, clerk of the New York State Senate
- Robert Benson (barrister) (1797–1844), English judge and author
- Robert Benson (Australian politician) (1800–1860), Australian miner and politician in colonial Victoria

== Sports ==
- Bob Benson (footballer) (Robert William Benson, 1883–1916), English footballer who died during a game
- Robert Benson (ice hockey) (1894–1965), Canadian ice hockey player
- Robbie Benson (born 1992), Irish footballer
- Bob Benson (American football), American football coach

== Others ==
- Robin Benson (Robert Henry Benson, 1850–1929), English merchant banker, art collector and FA Cup winner
- Robert Hugh Benson (1871–1914), British author, Anglican priest, Catholic priest

== Other uses ==
- Bobby Benson and the B-Bar-B Riders, American radio program
