= Beson =

Beson is a surname, similar to Bason and Benson. Notable people with the surname include:

- Timothy Beson, American politician
- Warren Beson (1923–1959), American football player and coach

== See also ==
- Bison
