= John Bason =

British businessman (born 1957)

- Born: 24 April 1957 (age 69); Knutsford, Cheshire, England
- Education: Trinity College, Cambridge
- Occupation: Businessman

John Bason (born 24 April 1957) is a British businessman.

== Early life ==
John Bason was born on 24 April 1957 in Knutsford, Cheshire, England. He graduated from Trinity College, Cambridge, where he earned an MA in Natural Sciences.

== Career ==
Bason began his career by joining the graduate training scheme at British Airways.

Bason was finance director of Bunzl. Since May 2009, he has been finance director of Associated British Foods, which owns Primark, British Sugar, Twinings, etc. He also is on the board of directors of Compass Group since 21 June 2011. In 2022 he joined the board of publisher Bloomsbury Plc as a non-executive director, and was appointed as chairman of the board following the 2024 annual meeting. He is a member of the Institute of Chartered Accountants in England and Wales.

He is on the board of trustees of Voluntary Service Overseas, and deputy chairman of FareShare.
