= Robert Benson (ice hockey) =

Icelandic-Canadian ice hockey player

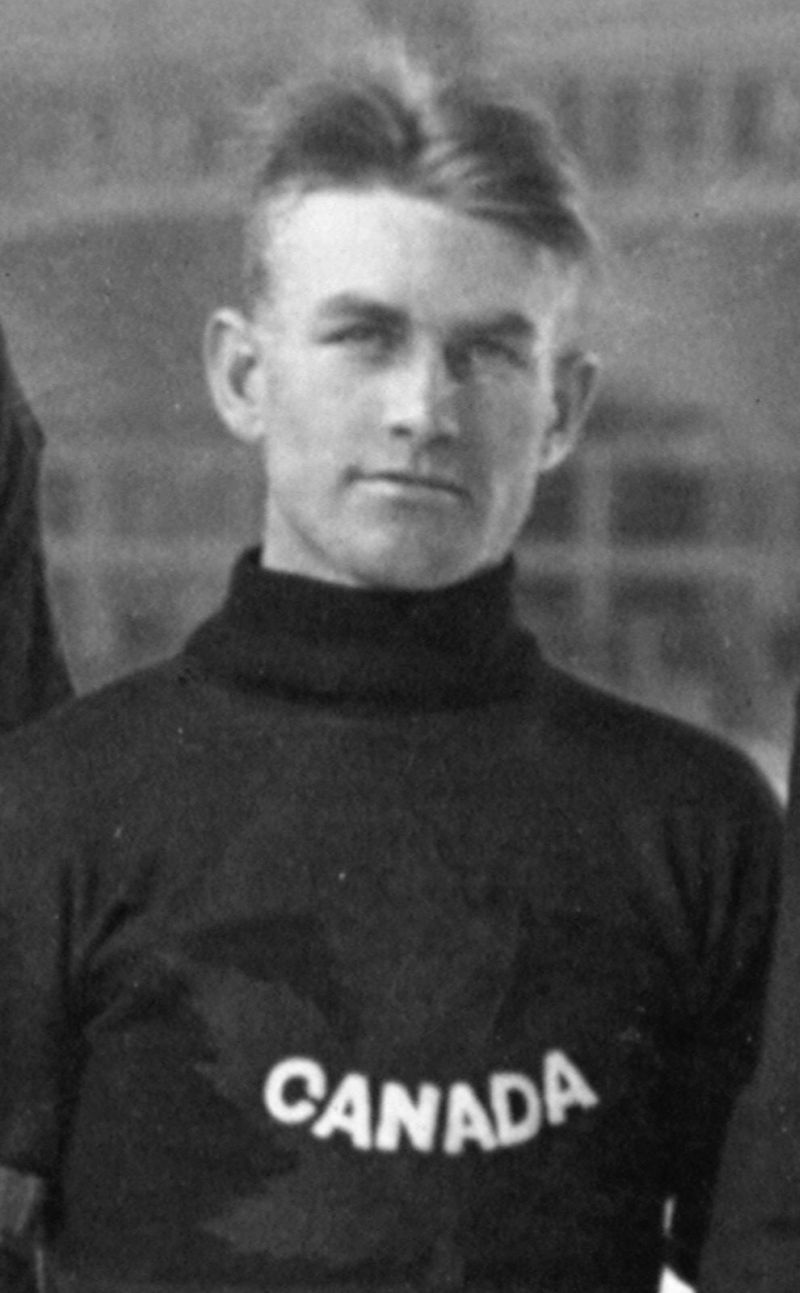
- Robert Benson at the 1920 Olympics
- Born: May 18, 1894 Davidson, Saskatchewan, Canada
- Died: September 7, 1965 (aged 71) Winnipeg, Manitoba, Canada
- Height: 5 ft 3 in (160 cm)
- Weight: 135 lb (61 kg; 9 st 9 lb)
- Position: Defence
- Shot: Left
- Played for: Calgary Tigers
- National team: Canada
- Playing career: 1912–1932
Medal record
Olympic Games
Gold medal – first place	1920 Antwerp	Team

Robert John Benson (May 18, 1894 – September 7, 1965) was an Icelandic-Canadian ice hockey player. A defenceman, he started his career with the Winnipeg Falcons of the Manitoba Hockey League in 1913, remaining with them until 1920, though missed two seasons of play from 1917 to 1919 while serving in the First World War. With the Falcons he played at the 1920 Summer Olympics and won the first gold medal in Olympic ice hockey. He later played in the Western Canada Hockey League from 1921 to 1926, as well as 8 games with the Boston Bruins of the National Hockey League during the 1924–25 season. Benson continued playing in other minor leagues until retiring in 1931.

== Playing career ==
Benson was born in Davidson, Saskatchewan, to Icelandic immigrants Benedikt Jóhannesson and Rósa Guðmundsdóttir.

He was the younger brother of ice hockey player Connie Benson.

During the 1920–21 season, Canadian Amateur Hockey Association president H. J. Sterling hired a detective who discovered that Benson and teammate Haldor Halderson received C$6,500 to play amateur hockey. The Amateur Athletic Union of Canada voided Halderson's registration card and he was suspended from the 1921 Allan Cup playoffs, although the Saskatchewan Amateur Hockey Association allowed him and his Saskatoon team to continue in the league playoffs.

== Career statistics ==
=== Regular season and playoffs ===
			Regular season					Playoffs
Season	Team	League	GP	G	A	Pts	PIM	GP	G	A	Pts	PIM
1912–13	Winnipeg Strathconas	WSrHL	8	3	0	3	—	2	0	0	0	0
1913–14	Winnipeg Falcons	MHL	12	2	0	2	—	—	—	—	—	—
1914–15	Winnipeg Falcons	MHL	8	3	0	3	—	2	0	0	0	6
1915–16	Winnipeg Falcons	MHL	7	2	0	2	12	—	—	—	—	—
1916–17	Winnipeg 223rd Battalion	MHL	8	3	1	4	4	—	—	—	—	—
1919–20	Winnipeg Falcons	MHL	9	2	1	3	26	—	—	—	—	—
1919–20	Winnipeg Falcons	Al-Cup	—	—	—	—	—	6	0	5	5	13
1920–21	Saskatoon Crescents	SSHL	16	12	1	13	39	4	2	1	3	12
1921–22	Saskatoon Crescents	WCHL	23	9	4	13	21	—	—	—	—	—
1922–23	Calgary Tigers	WCHL	27	7	1	8	22	—	—	—	—	—
1923–24	Calgary Tigers	WCHL	26	5	5	10	24	2	0	0	0	4
1923–24	Calgary Tigers	West-P	—	—	—	—	—	3	0	1	1	0
1923–24	Calgary Tigers	St-Cup	—	—	—	—	—	2	0	0	0	0
1924–25	Calgary Tigers	WCHL	9	0	1	1	4	—	—	—	—	—
1924–25	Boston Bruins	NHL	8	0	1	1	4	—	—	—	—	—
1925–26	Saskatoon Crescents	WHL	12	0	0	0	0	—	—	—	—	—
1925–26	Edmonton Eskimos	WHL	12	0	0	0	0	2	0	0	0	2
1926–27	Moose Jaw Warriors	PHL	32	6	4	10	65	—	—	—	—	—
1927–28	Winnipeg Maroons	AHA	2	0	0	0	0	—	—	—	—	—
1927–28	Minneapolis Millers	AHA	21	2	0	2	36	8	0	1	1	23
1928–29	Minneapolis Millers	AHA	40	3	4	7	92	4	0	0	0	2
1929–30	Seattle Eskimos	PCHL	36	2	3	5	82	—	—	—	—	—
1930–31	Seattle Eskimos	PCHL	33	2	2	4	76	4	0	0	0	8
WCHL/WHL totals			109	21	11	32	71	7	0	1	1	6
NHL totals			8	0	1	1	4	—	—	—	—	—

=== International ===
Year	Team	Event	GP	G	A	Pts	PIM
1920	Canada	OLY	3	1	0	1	2
Senior totals			3	1	0	1	2

== Awards and achievements ==
- Allan Cup Championship (1920)
- Olympic Gold Medalist (1920)
