= Willem Benson =

Flemish Renaissance painter

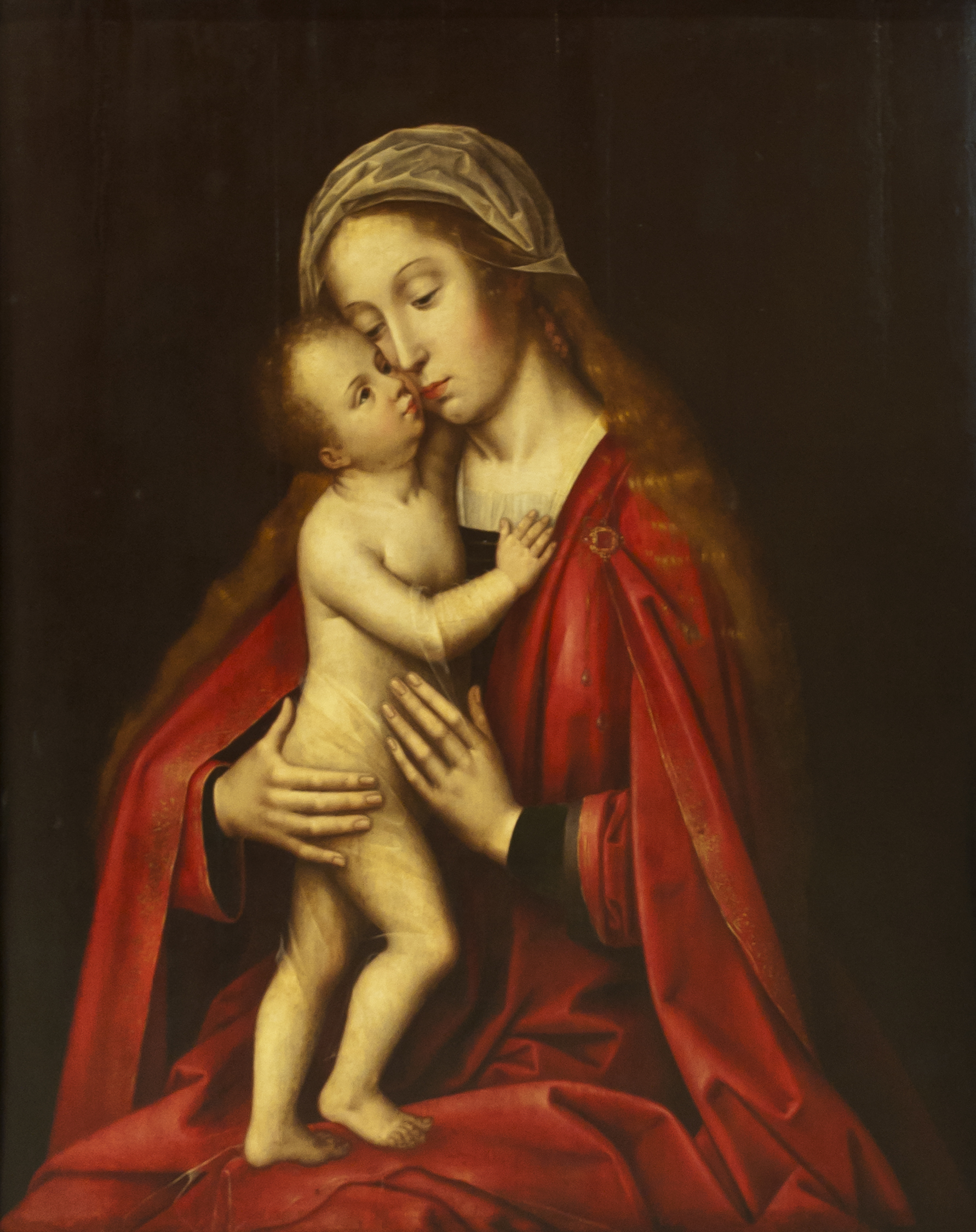
Virgin and child, 1550

Willem Benson (1521–1574), was a Flemish Renaissance painter.

He was born in Bruges as the son of Ambrosius Benson, and was the brother of Jan, and the father of Ambrosius II. Benson's works are confused with Adriaen Isenbrant, and he was sometimes called Guillaume or Guillermo. He died in Middelburg.
