= The Watt Club =

The Watt Club is the alumni association of Heriot-Watt University and the oldest association of its kind in the United Kingdom. Founded in 1854, today the Club has over 82,000 members worldwide.

== History ==
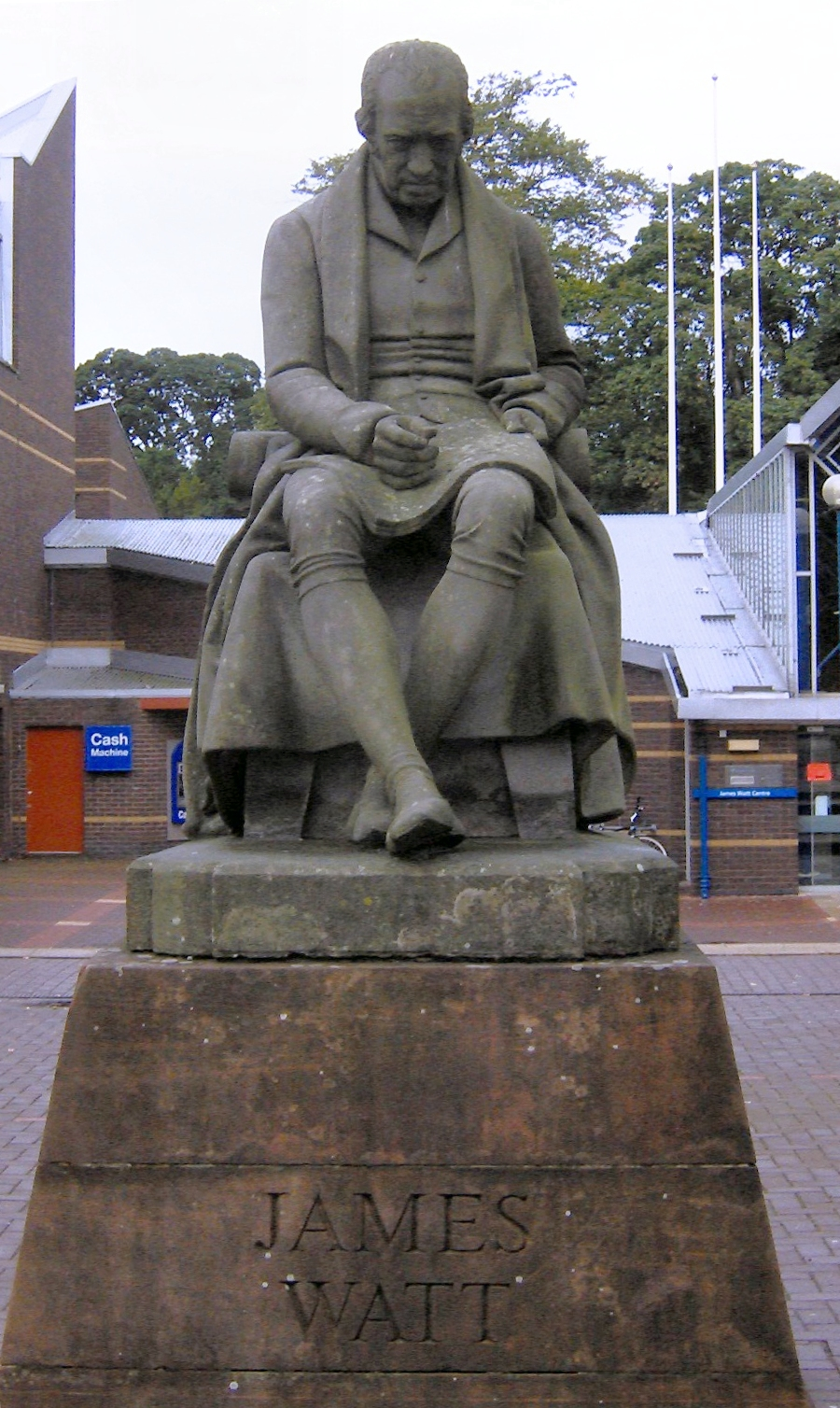
Statue of James Watt, the unveiling of which led to the formation of the Watt Club.

The Watt Club was founded on 12 May 1854 following the unveiling of a statue of James Watt outside the Watt Institution and School of Arts (later Heriot-Watt University). At a late-night event to celebrate the occasion, Edinburgh Jeweller John E. Vernon argued for the formation of an organisation that would celebrate Watt's life, stating:

"[a club should be formed] whose object would be to sup together on the anniversary of the birth of James Watt…and also to promote the interests of the School, by raising a fund each year to provide prizes."

A club was subsequently formed with Vernon as its first President, and proceeded to hold its first dinner in celebration of Watt's birthday on 20 January 1855. Such dinners remained popular for several years, with the status of members increasing as the organisation's notoriety grew.

Membership of the Watt Club began to decline in the 1880s, however, and in 1910 the organisation officially ceased to exist. It remained defunct until 1935, when a request from the Science Museum to borrow one of its old medals from Heriot-Watt College led to renewed interest in the organisation. The Club was subsequently reconstituted on 28 November of that year.

After Heriot-Watt became a university in 1966, the Watt Club allowed graduates to become members free of charge. Following this the roles of the Club and the Graduates' Association of the University became increasingly similar, and the two bodies ultimately merged in 1994. As a result, the Club became the official alumni association of the University, a position it has held ever since.

== Constitution ==
Students of Heriot-Watt automatically become life members of the Watt Club upon graduation from the University. Members are entitled to vote in the Club's elections, attend its annual meetings and receive a variety of additional benefits. In particular, they have access to the organisation's local branches around the world and ambassadors on four continents.

The Club elects a president every two years who chairs the organisation's annual meetings, represents the views of members to the senior management of Heriot-Watt and takes part in various ceremonial functions. The Club also appoints a vice-president to act in the role when the president is unable to do so., and has a Council of up to 20 members which seeks to further the organisation's aims and objectives.

== Awards ==
Each year, the Watt Club gives awards to Heriot-Watt students whose work is considered of outstanding merit:

- The Watt Club Medal, which dates back to 1891, is considered the highest award Heriot-Watt can endow. It is awarded yearly to the final year undergraduate student with the highest mark in each degree discipline.
- The Watt Club Postgraduate Medal is awarded to the strongest postgraduate students in each of Heriot-Watt's schools.
- The Watt Club Prize is awarded to any undergraduate or postgraduate student in recognition of exceptional effort, achievement and initiative.

Yasmin Schembri was awarded the Watt Club Medal for Energy, Geoscience, Infrastructure and Society in 2022.
