= Bernadette Benson =

Canadian ultramarathon runner

Bernadette Benson is a Canadian born athlete specialising in ultra distance events. Among Benson's records are: Australian Open records for 12 hour, 24 hour races where she covered 133.535 km and 238.261 kilometres respectively. She also holds the record for the 100 mile and 200 km distances, at times of 15:24:44 and 19:58:31. In 2016, she set a Guinness World Record for distance covered in twelve hours on a treadmill: 128.62 kilometres.
