= Michael Benson =

Michael Benson may refer to:

- Michael Benson (poet) (1795–1871), English printer and poet
- Michael Benson (filmmaker) (born 1962), American writer, filmmaker, photographer and exhibitions producer
- Michael T. Benson (born 1965), American university president
- Mike Benson (Canadian football) (born 1987), Canadian football player
- Mike Benson (screenwriter), American television writer and comics writer
- Mike Benson (politician) (born 1955), Minnesota politician
