= Bruce Ellis Benson =

Professor of Philosophy

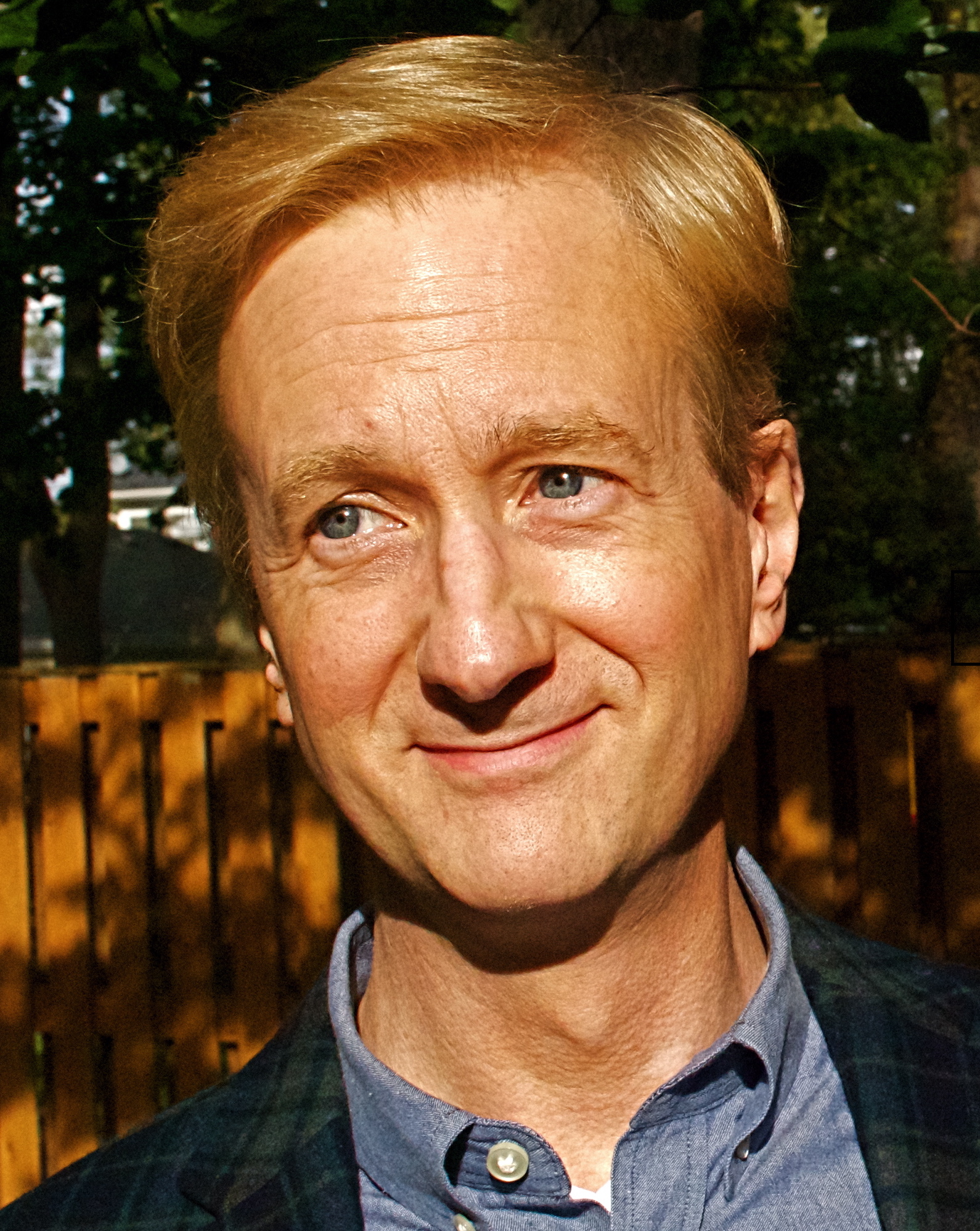
Bruce Ellis Benson in 2014

Bruce Ellis Benson (born 1960) is an American philosopher. He was formerly a professor at Wheaton College in Illinois.

== Publications ==
- Graven Ideologies: Nietzsche, Derrida & Marion on Modern Idolatry. Downer's Grove, IL: InterVarsity Press, 2002.
- The Improvisation of Musical Dialogue: A Phenomenology of Music. Cambridge: Cambridge University Press, 2003.
- Pious Nietzsche: Decadence and Dionysian Faith. Bloomington: Indiana University Press, 2008.
- Liturgy as a Way of Life: Embodying the Arts in Christian Worship. Ada, MI: Baker Academic, 2013.
- The New Phenomenology: A Philosophical Introduction (with J. Aaron Simmons). London: Bloomsbury Academic, 2013.
