= Violet Benson =

Russian-born Podcast Host and Comedian

- Born: Violet Benson; Saint Petersburg, Russia
- Education: California State University, Northridge
- Occupations: Comedian and Podcast Host
- Years active: 2014–present
- Height: 5’8”
- Website: https://violetbenson.com

Violet Benson, better known by her online alias and persona Daddy Issues, is a Russian-American comedian best known for running the Instagram account "Daddy Issues".

== Early life ==
Benson was born in Saint Petersburg, Russia, and lived briefly in Israel before her family won the green card lottery and moved to Los Angeles, California when she was 14. Benson has two degrees, in Business Law and Accounting. Benson was an accountant at a large public accounting firm when she says she created the Daddy Issues account as "a funny escape".

== Career ==
Benson started her Daddy Issues Instagram account on July 5, 2014. Benson has earned over 5 million followers on Instagram and is known as one of the fastest growing accounts and one of the largest funny female accounts that even MTV took notice. Though best known for Instagram, Benson is also a stand up comedian, television host, and a podcast host.

Benson hosts the popular podcasts, Almost Adulting, with Gumball and, Hey Besties, exclusively with Spotify and Spotify Live.

Benson kept her identity a secret at first until August 31, 2015 due to a lack of self confidence, when she finally decided to reveal her identity via an exclusive interview with MTV. Before her big reveal, Benson served as a guest blogger for MTV during the pre-show coverage for the 2015 Video Music Awards and was later named "The Instagram Meme Queen" by Vanity Fair

== Style of comedy ==
Benson blogs, curates and creates original memes, and creates funny videos where she makes fun of herself and the struggles of growing up in the 21st century. Benson also does stand up comedy.
