= Nicholas John Benson =

British-American military officer and businessman

- Born: October 26, 1961 (age 64)
- Education: Royal Military Academy Sandhurst

Nick "Bomber" Benson (born 26 November 1961) was the CEO of the Sunterra Corporation, headquartered in Las Vegas, Nevada.

Benson grew up in Ghana before attending the Royal Military Academy Sandhurst where he went on to spend 10 years as an infantry officer. He has extensive legal training, sponsored in school by Meyer Brown Rowe & Maw.

Benson is the author of Rats' Tales, a soldier's story. The most notable thing about Rats' Tales is the introductions - one by Prince Andrew and the other by Gen. Norman Schwarzkopf, Jr.
