= Thomas Benson (priest) =

Thomas Benson (1654 – 1715) was an Anglican priest in Ireland during the late 17th and early 18th centuries.

Benson was educated at Trinity College, Dublin. He was the Archdeacon of Kildare from 1681 until his death.;
