= Bruce B. Benson =

Professor of physics at Amherst College

Bruce Buzzell Benson (1922–1990) was a professor of physics at the Amherst College.

Benson was born in Choteau, Montana. He was a graduate of Amherst College and then got his master's and Ph.D. degrees from Yale University where he later served as an instructor from 1944 to 1946. In 1947, Benson returned to his alma mater to join its faculty. From 1957 to 1967 he was an associate professor of physics at the Woods Hole Oceanographic Institution and from 1977 to 1990 served as an associate editor of the journal Marine Chemistry. During his time as professor of physics at Amherst, he worked closely with Daniel Krause, studying thermodynamics of the solubilities of gases. Benson died of respiratory failure on March 7, 1990 at Cooley Dickinson Hospital, Northampton, Massachusetts.

Benson's wife, Lucy Wilson Benson, was involved with local liberal politics of the time, and was a president of the League of Women Voters. Bruce Benson joined the League of Women Voters, too, and was reportedly its first male member. Lucy Benson served as U.S. Secretary of Health and Human Services as well as Under Secretary of State for Arms Control and International Security Affairs.

Seven years after Benson's death, Harry V. Keefe, a former roommate of Benson, donated the Keefe Science Library to Amherst in his honor.

== Awards ==
- Guggenheim Fellow (1958)
