= Frank Benson =

Frank Benson may refer to:

- Frank Benson (actor) (1858–1939), British actor-manager and tennis player
- Frank Weston Benson (1862–1951), American impressionist artist
- Frank W. Benson (politician) (1858–1911), American politician and Governor of Oregon
- Frank T. Benson (died 1967), American politician from Maryland
- Frank Benson (artist, born 1976), American sculptor and photographer
- Frank Benson (footballer) (1898–1981), Irish Gaelic footballer
- Frank L. Benson, attorney general of Idaho
