= John Benson (clockmaker) =

English clockmaker

John Benson was an English clockmaker who lived and worked in Whitehaven, mainly on brass dial eight-day clocks with rolling moons for the upper market. Many have centre calendar work, simple tidal indicators, music, quarter-chiming and/or astronomical functions. He noted about twenty, including one with quarter chimes and music, most in red walnut or mahogany cases. He married in 1750, moved to Belfast in 1753, then back to Whitehaven in 1755, where he died in 1798.

According to the Regent Antiques website, "Possibly his most famous work is in the main hall of 10 Downing Street, the residence of the British Prime Minister. It's reported that the chimes annoyed Winston Churchill enough that he had the musical part turned off."
