= Reysa Bernson =

French astronomer

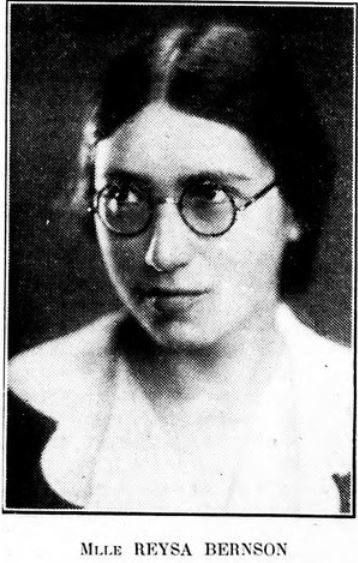
- Born: 26 September 1904; Lille, France
- Died: 1944 (aged 39–40); Auschwitz
- Education: Lycée Fénelon; University of Lille
- Organization(s): Association Astronomique du Nord; Société Astronomique de France
- Known for: Popularization of astronomy Promotion of planetaria
- Parent(s): Désiré Verhaeghe (father); Dweira Bernson-Verhaeghe (mother)

Reysa Verhaeghe or Reysa Bernson (September 26, 1904 - 1944) was a French astronomer. She founded the Association Astronomique du Nord in 1923. She was particularly known for her work popularizing astronomy in France through public demonstrations and the development of planetaria. A detailed timeline and the full list of her publications, as well as publications about her, have been made available.

== Early life ==
Reysa Bernson was born in Lille September 28, 1904. Her parents, Désiré Verhaeghe and Dweira Bernson-Verhaeghe, were both doctors. In 1920, her parents separated, though they did not divorce. After the separation, Reysa frequently went by her mother's family name, Verhaeghe. Her father died when she was 26.

== Education ==
Reysa Bernson attended high school at the Lycée Fénelon de Lille. In 1921, she obtained her baccalauréat Sciences et Langues and completed her first year of Russian studies at the University of Lille. In 1922, she obtained her baccalauréat from the Faculté des Sciences.

In 1923, she finished her undergraduate degree in Russian studies from the University of Lille. In 1924, she finished a degree in science. In the following years, she would complete certifications in a number of fields: astronomy, chemistry, and radiotelegraphy. In 1927, she earned a teaching certification. In 1934, she earned a doctorate in astronomy from the University of Lille.

Bernson was active in student life at the University of Lille. Bernson participated in restarting the student publication Annales de l'Association des Étudiates de Lille. In 1926, Bernson was a delegate to the 15th Congrès de l'Union Nationale des Étudiants de France in Poitiers. The following year, she became treasurer of the newly-formed Lille student union. On April 27 of 1927, she was elected vice-president of the National Student Union, the only woman elected to a cabinet position in the organization.

In 1928 and from 1931 to 1934, along with her studies, Bernson worked as préparateur, or athletic trainer, at the University of Lille.

== Career ==
Reysa Bernson was passionate about astronomy from a young age. On May 5, 1920, at the age of 16, she was admitted to the Société Astronomique de France.

In 1923, Reysa Bernson founded the Association Astronomique du Nord (AAN), an organization with the aim of founding an observatory and a library, as well as gathering amateur astronomers in the region. Bernson also worked to generally introduce students throughout the region to astronomy.

in 1932, she won the Henry Rey prize from the Société Astronomique de France in recognition of her work popularizing astronomy.

In 1936, Reysa Bernson, along with Henri Lhote, created an Éclaireurs de France scouting group, the Groupe Camille Flammarion, to encourage youth participation in astronomy. The group arranged star-watching excursions and learned to read star maps.

In 1937, Reysa Bernson was the secretary general of the Planetarium of the Exposition Internationale in Paris, which saw around 800,000 visitors during the six months of the exhibition. Two notable visitors to the Planetarium were astronomers Armand Delsemme and Gérard de Vaucouleurs. In 1938, Bernson was recognized for her work during the exhibition in encouraging more people to join the society by being awarded two prizes from the Société Astronomique de France: the Prix de l'Observatoire de la Guette and the Médaille commémorative.

On June 2, 1940, twelve days before the Nazis invaded Paris, Reysa Bernson met with other members of the Société Astronomique at Camille Flammarion's grave at the Camille Fammarion Observatory near the city.

Archival records indicate that Bernson remained professionally active in some capacity during the Occupation up to 1943.

== Death ==
On February 23, 1944, Reysa Bernson, along with her mother, Dweira Bernson-Verhaeghe, were arrested in Dreux, to the west of Paris, for being Jewish. Despite the efforts of friends in Lille to save them, the women were sent shortly afterward to a concentration camp in Drancy, with a one-day stop in Chartres. On May 7, Reysa Bernson and her mother were sent to Auschwitz, where they were killed by the Nazis.

== Memorials ==
There is an asteroid named after Bernson: 21114 Bernson.

By decision of the municipal council in 2018, there is an allée Reysa Bernson in the Saint-Maurice Pellevoisin quarter of the city of Lille.
