= Patricia Benson =

American artist

S. Patricia Benson
- Born: Sarah Patricia McMahon; July 27, 1941; Philadelphia, Pennsylvania
- Died: July 6, 2024, 82 years Alfred, Maine
- Education: Bachelor of Fine Arts in Printmaking, Michigan State University; Master in Fine Arts in Printmaking Florida State University
- Known for: Printmaking
- Notable work: Our Brother’s Keeper: The Indian in White America (1969), Vulture II (1968)
- Style: Printmaking
- Children: Sarah Benson Waters, Erin Peck Yarema
- Parent(s): Thomas Edward McMahon III and Sarah Adelaide Shute McMahon

S. Patricia "Patty" Benson (1941–2024) was an American artist, known for printmaking.

Her work is included in the collections of the Smithsonian American Art Museum, the Brooklyn Museum, the Cincinnati Art Museum and the Fine Arts Museums of San Francisco.

Benson was born in Philadelphia, Pennsylvania on July 27, 1941. She was raised in Pawnee Mission, Kansas, and later moved to Greenwich, Connecticut for high school.

She later received a Bachelor of Arts degree in Printmaking from Michigan State University and went to pursue a master's degree in Fine Arts in Printmaking at Florida State University.

Benson later went on be an art educator, teaching fine arts at a number of institutions, among them, Florida State University, University of Florida, Sonoma State College, San Francisco Art Institute, Portland School of Art and the University of Southern Maine. She spent her later life in Alfred, Maine, and retired from the University of Southern Maine after forty years of tenure.

== Selected works ==
- Patricia Benson, Our Brother's Keeper: The Indian in White America, 1969, screenprint, 28 1/2 x 21 in. (72.4 x 53.3 cm), Smithsonian American Art Museum, Museum purchase, 1970.25
- S. Patricia Benson, Vulture II, 1968. Engraving Brooklyn Museum, Bristol-Myers Fund, 68.105.1.
