= Alexander Benson =

American diplomat

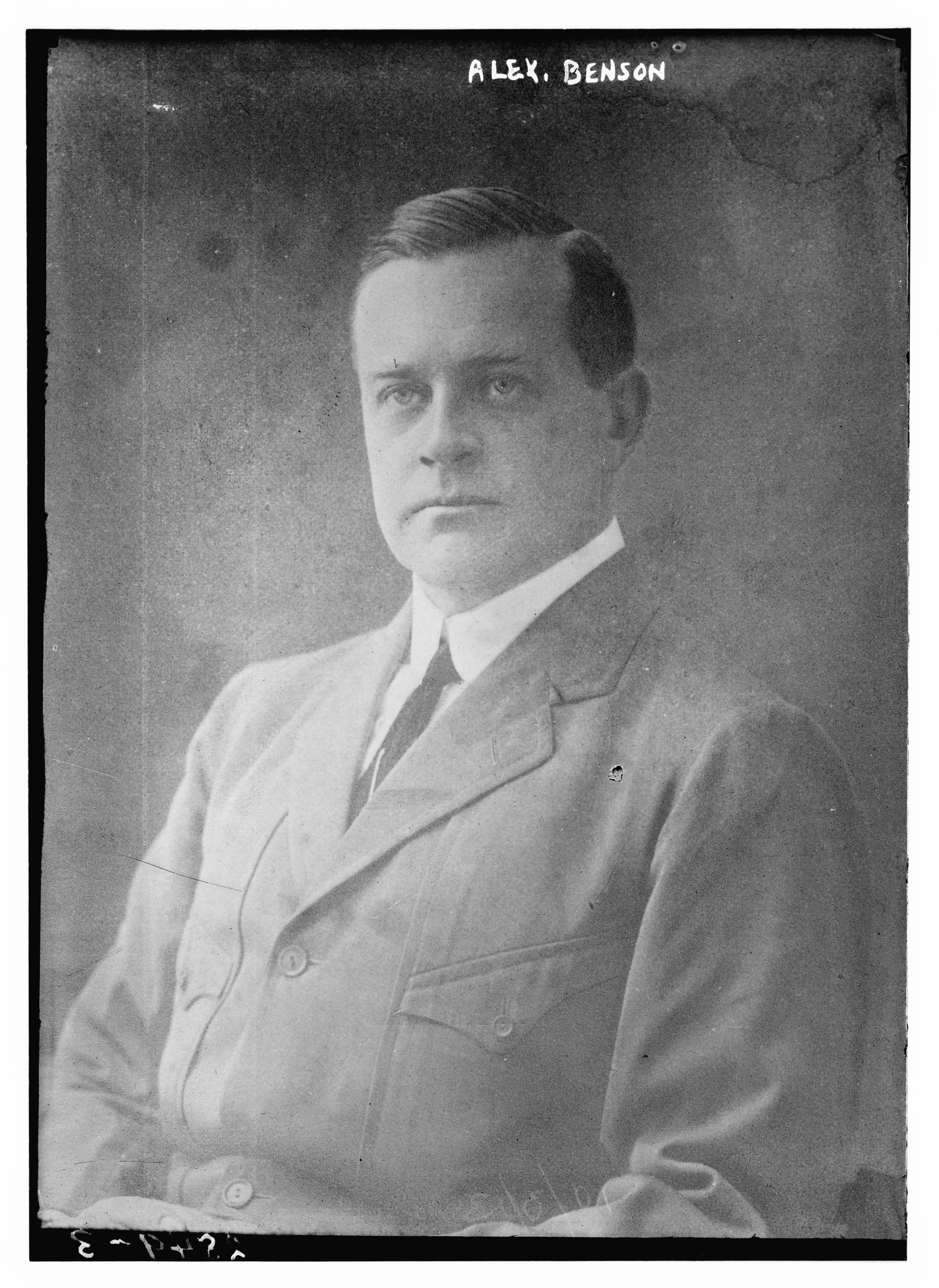

Alexander Benson (1872 - November 8, 1947) was an American diplomat.

== Biography ==
He was born in 1872. Having served as Secretary of Legation to Bolivia, he was appointed Second Secretary of the Embassy of the United States at St. Petersburg, Russian Empire in 1911. In 1913, as Second Secretary, he was put in charge of the Embassy of the United States in Rome. He died on November 9, 1947.
