= James Benson (disambiguation) =

James Benson may refer to:

- James Rea Benson (1807–1885), Canadian businessman and politician
- James Benson (Medal of Honor) (1845–1890), United States Navy sailor
- James Benson (RAF officer) (1914–1987), British flying ace of the Second World War
- James Benson (Jim Benson, c. 1945–2008), American spaceflight developer
- James William Benson (1826–1878), English scientific instrument maker and watchmaker
- James Benson II, American sprinter and winner of the 2023 4 × 400 meter relay at the NCAA Division I Indoor Track and Field Championships
