= Connie Benson =

Canadian ice hockey player

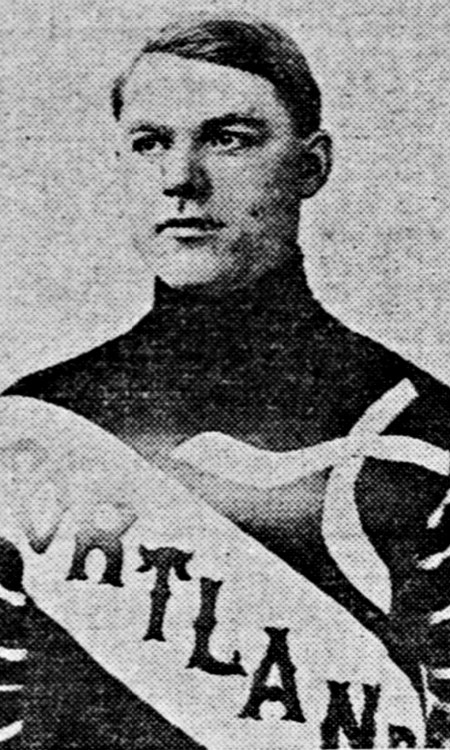
- Benson with the Portland Rosebuds.
- Born: April 25, 1889; Finsbury, Saskatchewan, Canada
- Died: March 1, 1969 (aged 79); Cook County, Illinois, USA
- Height: 5 ft 6 in (168 cm)
- Weight: 165 lb (75 kg; 11 st 11 lb)
- Position: Defence
- Shot: Left
- Played for: Portland Rosebuds; Saskatoon/Moose Jaw Sheiks
- Playing career: 1909–1930

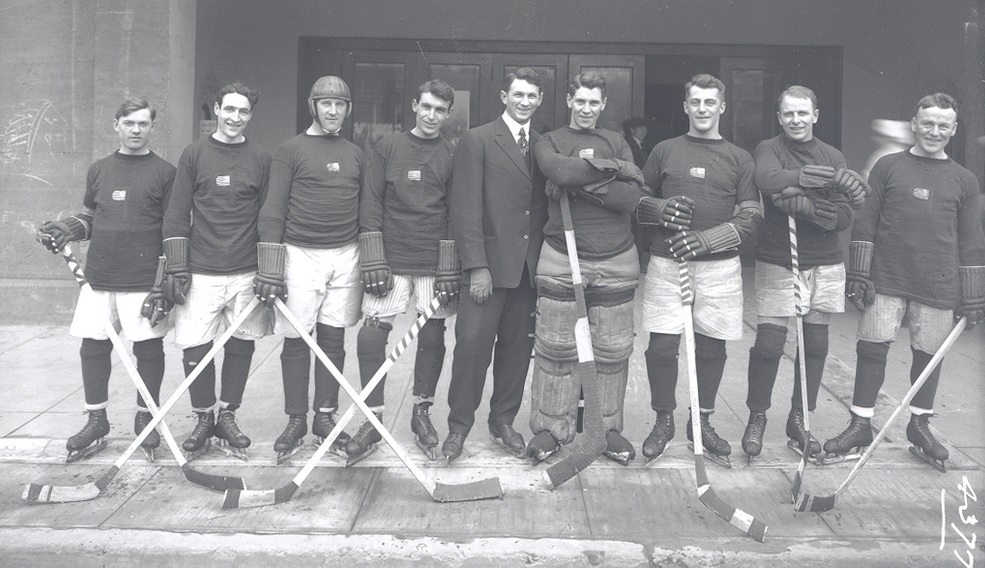
Benson, at far left, with the 1914–15 Portland Rosebuds.

Conrad Alfred Benson (April 25, 1889 – March 1, 1969) was an Icelandic-Canadian professional ice hockey player. He played for the Portland Rosebuds of the Pacific Coast Hockey Association from 1914 to 1915.

During the 1913–14 season Benson played with the Phoenix team in the Boundary League in British Columbia. He had also previously played hockey in Winnipeg.

He was the older brother of ice hockey player Robert Benson.
