= William Sol Benson =

American esperantist

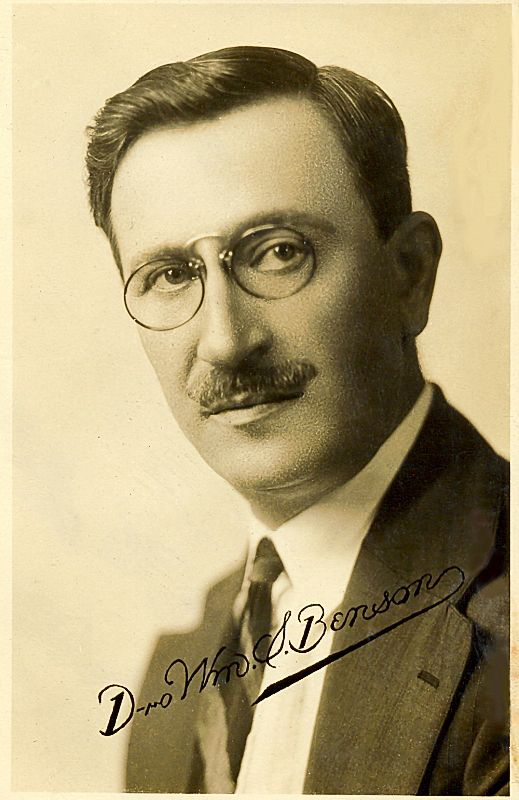
William Benson

William Sol Benson (August 24, 1877 – October 21, 1945) was an Esperantist.

Benson was born in Kyiv. He emigrated from the Russian Empire to the United States in 1889. He was an osteopathic physician in Newark, New Jersey. He was also the author of an original method for teaching Esperanto using pictures and the owner of Benson's School of Esperanto. He authored 10 Kajerojn de Universala Esperantigilo (1925–1927) and Bensona Universala Esperanto-Metodo (1932). Benson was a member of American Academy of Esperanto (Amerika Esperanto-Akademio) in the 1940s.

== Works ==
- Benson School of Esperanto (22 p.)
- Dr. Benson's personal mail course practical Esperanto
- Universala Esperantistigilo (1925)
- Universala Esperanto-metodo (1932)
- Practical Esperanto by Dr. Benson (1925–1932)
- Universala propagandilo: specimena leciono (1928, 22 p., ilustr.)
