= Noel Galea Bason =

Maltese sculptor and medalist (1955–2026)

- Born: 1955; Floriana, Crown Colony of Malta
- Died: 14 May 2026 (aged 71)
- Education: Istituto Poligrafico e Zecca dello Stato
- Occupations: Sculptor, medalist

Noel Galea Bason (1955 – 14 May 2026) was a Maltese sculptor and medalist.

Galea Bason trained at the Istituto Poligrafico e Zecca dello Stato and served as the sole coin designer for the Malta mint from 1977 to 1991. He also created a monument for former Prime Minister Dom Mintoff, unveiled in Castile Place, Valletta.

Galea Bason died on 14 May 2026, at the age of 71.
