= Steve Benson =

Steve Benson may refer to:

- Steve Benson (cartoonist) (1954–2025), American editorial cartoonist
- Steve Benson (poet) (born 1949), American poet and performer
- Stephen Allen Benson (1816–1865), president of Liberia
- Steven Benson (murderer) (1951–2015), American convicted double murderer
- Steve Benson, pseudonym of Dieter Bohlen (born 1954), German producer and ex-member of Modern Talking
- Steve Benson, character in Frank Perreti's novel The Oath
