= William John Chapman Benson =

British-Canadian businessman

William John Chapman Benson (c. 1818 – 3 December 1850) was a British-born trader who came to Canada where he established himself in the Quebec timber trade.

Benson was born in London in 1818 to parents Thomas and Sarah Benson. He was named after a brother who died as an infant.

Benson quickly established himself as a prominent capitalist in the Quebec commercial community. He was involved in the British North American Electric Telegraph Association as well as the Quebec and Melbourne Railway Company.
