= Trent Benson =

American murderer, serial rapist and suspected serial killer

- Born: Trent Christopher Benson; October 7, 1971 (age 55); South Korea
- Convictions: First degree murder x2 Sexual assault x3 Kidnapping x4 Attempted sexual assault
- Penalty: Death (murders); 135 years imprisonment (rapes)

Details
- Victims: 2+
- Span of crimes: 2004–2007
- Country: United States
- State: Arizona
- Date apprehended: May 14, 2008
- Imprisoned at: Florence State Prison, Florence, Arizona

Trent Christopher Benson (born October 7, 1971) is a South Korean-born American murderer, serial rapist and suspected serial killer who was linked via DNA evidence to at least four rapes in Mesa and Phoenix, Arizona from 2004 to 2007, two of which resulted in death. Benson was subsequently convicted and sentenced to death for these crimes in 2011, and is awaiting execution on death row.

== Early life ==
Trent Christopher Benson was born on October 7, 1971, in South Korea, but was abandoned by his birth parents and left to wander the streets before being taken in by an orphanage at age 3. There, he was adopted by David and Elizabeth Benson, an American couple from Fosston, Minnesota who already had several other adopted children. According to relatives and friends, the Bensons were described as a loving and caring couple who took good care of all their children.

Benson attended the local Fosston High School, where he was noted for his skills in track and field, singing in the school choir, and eventually becoming captain of the swimming team. He was considered an amicable and likable person by everyone around him and is not known to have exhibited any indecent behavior. After graduating, Benson went to study at Minnesota State University Moorhead from the fall of 1990 to the spring of 1992, and during this period, his only notable infraction was an arrest for shoplifting from a Dayton's department store in Fargo, North Dakota, but it is unknown if he served time for this offense. While he was well-liked by most of his fellow students, some alleged that he was overtly persistent in his attempts to court several girls and showed indications that there was a darker side to his personality.

After graduating from university, Benson found work as a salesman at a used car dealership, initially working in Minnesota before moving to Mesa, Arizona in 1996. There, he continued with his job at a local dealership and eventually married a woman named Merchelle Tohonnie, with whom he had a son. Their marriage lasted for several years before they eventually divorced, with Benson citing Tohonnie's supposed alcoholism as the main factor for this decision. In 2000, his parents bought a condominium in an affluent neighborhood in Mesa, where Benson moved in shortly afterward. He quickly gained respect amongst his neighbors, who considered him a pillar of the community who helped out his neighbors and frequently attended meetings of the homeowner's association. In late 2007, again with financing from his parents, Benson acquired a small store in a strip mall and soon started a business named "Lindsay Water and Ice", where he sold ice cream, candy, water, and ice.

== Murders ==
On November 1, 2004, Benson left a local strip club, and on his way back home, he picked up 21-year-old Alisa Marie Beck. After paying her for sex, he assaulted her, hitting her head against the steering wheel and choking her until she lost consciousness. He then left her partially-clothed body in an alleyway less than a mile away from his house and drove away. Beck's body was found later that day.

On August 16, 2007, he kidnapped a 47-year-old Hispanic woman from Horne and Main Street and pulled her inside his white Sedan. He then drove to an abandoned house, tore off her clothes, and raped her before leaving. After the assault, the woman hailed a taxi cab and was returned home, whereupon she informed the police. On October 14, Benson picked up 44-year-old Karen Jane Campbell off a street and negotiated a price for sex, but became angry when she asked for more money. He then attacked and killed her, leaving her body in a side street and attempting to speed away, accidentally running over her body as he did so. Her nude body was found ten days later, but police were unable to determine how exactly she had been killed. His final known attack took place on November 4, when Benson abducted a 35-year-old woman from Phoenix and took her to an abandoned house, where he raped and beat her. The victim survived the assault and was later found by a passerby.

== Arrest, trial, and imprisonment ==
Initially, the crimes were considered unrelated until DNA evidence linked them to a single perpetrator. Benson was considered a suspect in the crimes due to previous arrests for soliciting prostitutes in 1997 and 2001, and authorities started conducting surveillance on him for a chance to obtain his DNA. This came about when they collected a used cigarette and compared the DNA on it with that of the perpetrator, finding them to be an exact match. Because of this, Benson was arrested on May 14, 2008, and charged with two counts of murder, sexual assault, and kidnapping. The arrest came as a shock both to his neighbors in Mesa and his family and friends back in Fosston, all of whom considered him incapable of committing such horrific acts. His ex-wife was interviewed in the aftermath of this announcement, and while she claimed that he was emotionally abusive, Tohonnie claimed to be as shocked of this revelation as others were.

Shortly after his arrest, representatives from the Mesa Police Department stated that they believed Benson might have been involved in further rapes and possible murders, with a potential case being the murder of Elisa Dewakuku, who was found strangled in an irrigation canal on November 1, 2007. In the interrogations, Benson admitted to having sex with and assaulting the murdered women but claimed that he had blacked out and could not remember what exactly happened after that. According to authorities, he had an accomplice in at least one of the attacks, but this individual has never been identified or located.

Benson's trial took place three years after his arrest, with one factor for the delay being his lawyer's collection of information about his early life in South Korea to identify potential mitigating circumstances. He pleaded not guilty to all charges at his murder trial, but regardless of his denials that he was responsible, Benson was found guilty on all counts. The jury found no mitigating circumstances in his case, recommending that he be sentenced to death for the murders. Subsequently, Benson was sentenced to death for the murders and 135 years imprisonment for the sexual assaults.

As of February 2025, he is still alive and remains on Arizona's death row.

== See also ==
- Capital punishment in Arizona
- List of death row inmates in the United States § Arizona
- List of serial rapists
