= Rita Romilly Benson =

American actress and acting teacher

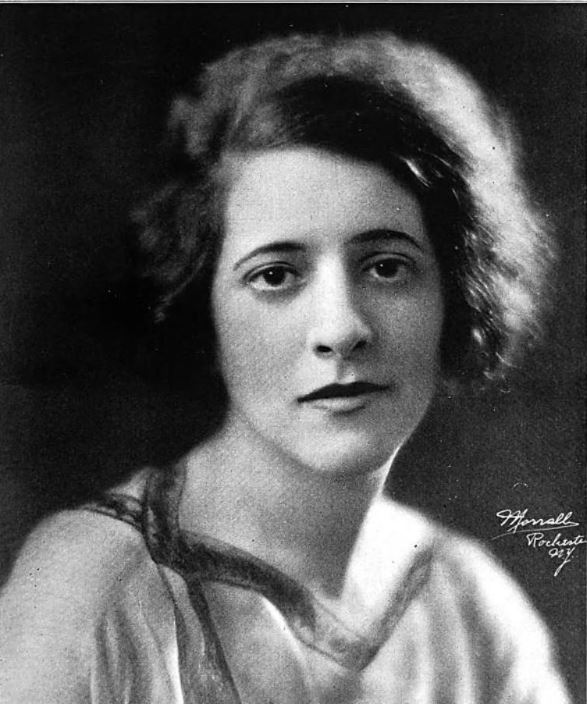
- Actors Directory and Stage Manual, 1925
- Born: September 7, 1900
- Died: April 4, 1980 (aged 79)
- Occupations: Actress; acting teacher

Rita Romilly Benson (September 7, 1900 – April 4, 1980) was an American stage actress, acting teacher, and an early proponent of Gurdjieff's teachings in America.

== Biography ==
Rita Romilly was born in 1900, to a successful Viennese businessman and a retired opera singer. She first lived in England before settling in New York City. Rita, trained as an actress, graduated from the American Academy of Dramatic Arts under its founder, Charles Jehlinger. By the 1920s, she was settled in New York and performing on- and off-Broadway. She did not have a long career on the stage before becoming a teacher, but her Broadway performances included roles as the "Sweet Maiden" in George M. Cohan's "The Tavern" (1921); Hazel Williams in "A Man's Man" (1925); Christina in "Easter One Day More" (1926); Hildegarde Sandbury in "The Unchastened Woman" (1926); and Masha in Tolstoy's "The Living Corpse" (1929).

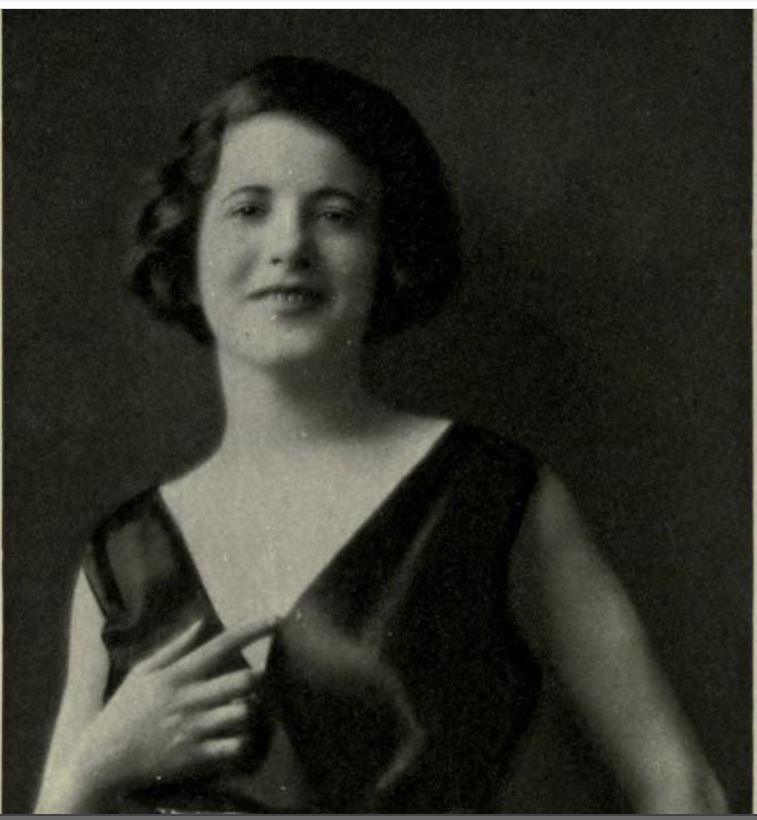
Romilly in Theater Magazine in 1921

She was a long-time teacher at the American Academy of Dramatic Arts and later became its director. While at the academy, she taught many young actors who would later become bigger stage and film stars, including Lauren Bacall, Kirk Douglas, and Colleen Dewhurst. She also privately taught accomplished actors, including Uta Hagen and Paul Robeson. Benson was Paul Robeson's drama coach when he got his role in Othello.

Benson, a lifelong friend of Carl Van Vechten, was, like Vechten, a white fixture and frequent host of the 1920s and 30s Harlem Renaissance social scene. According to Van Vechten, Rita's personality "demanded she be popular, well-liked, and the 'hostess with the mostest'." It was in her role as social hostess that she met Jacob Epstein, who briefly lived in New York in 1927–8. In his autobiography he recalls Benson's home as a place where "artists and writers gathered, and Paul Robeson sang, and there was no formality of dress or speech." Epstein would later sculpt a portrait bust of Benson when she visited England in 1937.

Benson was an important early student of George Gurdjieff from 1922 until his death in 1948. After his death, she continued to practice and spread Gurdjieff's beliefs, founding, with others, the New York Gurdjieff Foundation. In 1934, she married Martin W. Benson, another follower of Gurdjieff.

Benson died in New York in 1980.
