= Ambrosius Benson =

Italian painter (c. 1495/1500–1550)

Ambrosius Benson (Note: His original name was likely Benzone or Bensoni, or a variation.) (c. 1495/1500 – 1550) was an Italian painter who became a part of the Northern Renaissance. While many surviving paintings have been attributed, there is very little known of him from records, and he tended not to sign his work. He is believed to have produced mainly religious art, but also painted portraits on commission. He sometimes painted from classical sources, often setting the figures in a modern dress or a contemporary domestic setting. (Note: Benson's Death of Lucretia, First wife of Lucius Colatinus Tarquinius is an example of his depiction of a classical story in a contemporary domestic setting.) In his lifetime, he was successful; he had a large workshop, his work was sold internationally, and he was especially popular in Spain.

Benson became popular as a source for pastiche with 19th-century painters, who are sometimes known as the "followers of Benson". In particular, his many variations of the Magdalen and Sibilla Persica were further copied and became popular with contemporary buyers.

== Life ==
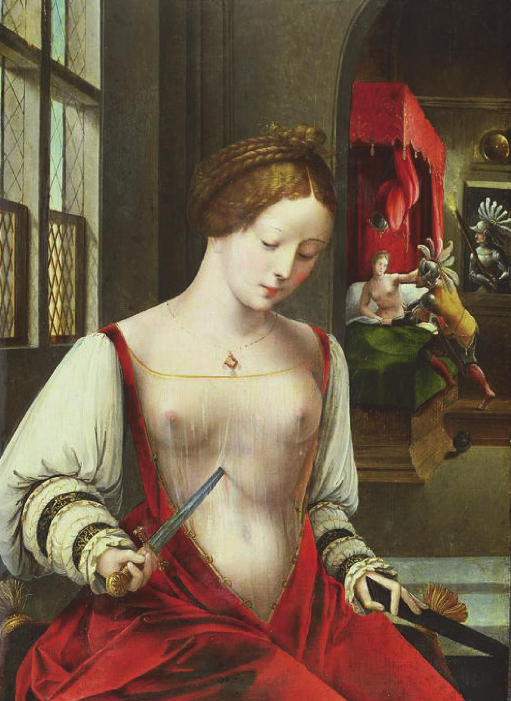
Death of Lucretia, date unknown. The rape that led to Lucretia's suicide can be seen in the background.

Although Ambrosius Benson (or Ambrose Benzone, as he is named by an early scholar in deference to his Lombardian origin) was Italian by birth, scholars consider him a painter of the Flemish school. (Note: Benson's whereabouts during his early years, as well as his training, appear to be unknown. For more information see "" pgs 38-40) He was born in Ferrara or Milan. Typical of the itinerant manner of many painters of the time, he moved to Bruges c. 1515 and served his apprenticeship with the Early Netherlandish painter Gerard David. He later became a naturalized citizen of Bruges. Benson worked as a journeyman before he was made master in 1519 and became a member of the guild of painters and saddle makers. He eventually became a dean and then a governor of the guild. He married Anna Ghyselin, and had two sons with her, Jan and Willem, both of whom became painters. He later remarried and had a daughter Anna. He is believed to have had at least two other daughters from extramarital affairs.

Benson came into dispute with Gerard around 1519 over a number of paintings and drawings Benson had created—including a book of studies for heads and nudes as well as various patterns—in the older master's workshop without his assistance. David refused to return the material, and after Benson pursued him legally, served time in prison for his appropriation.

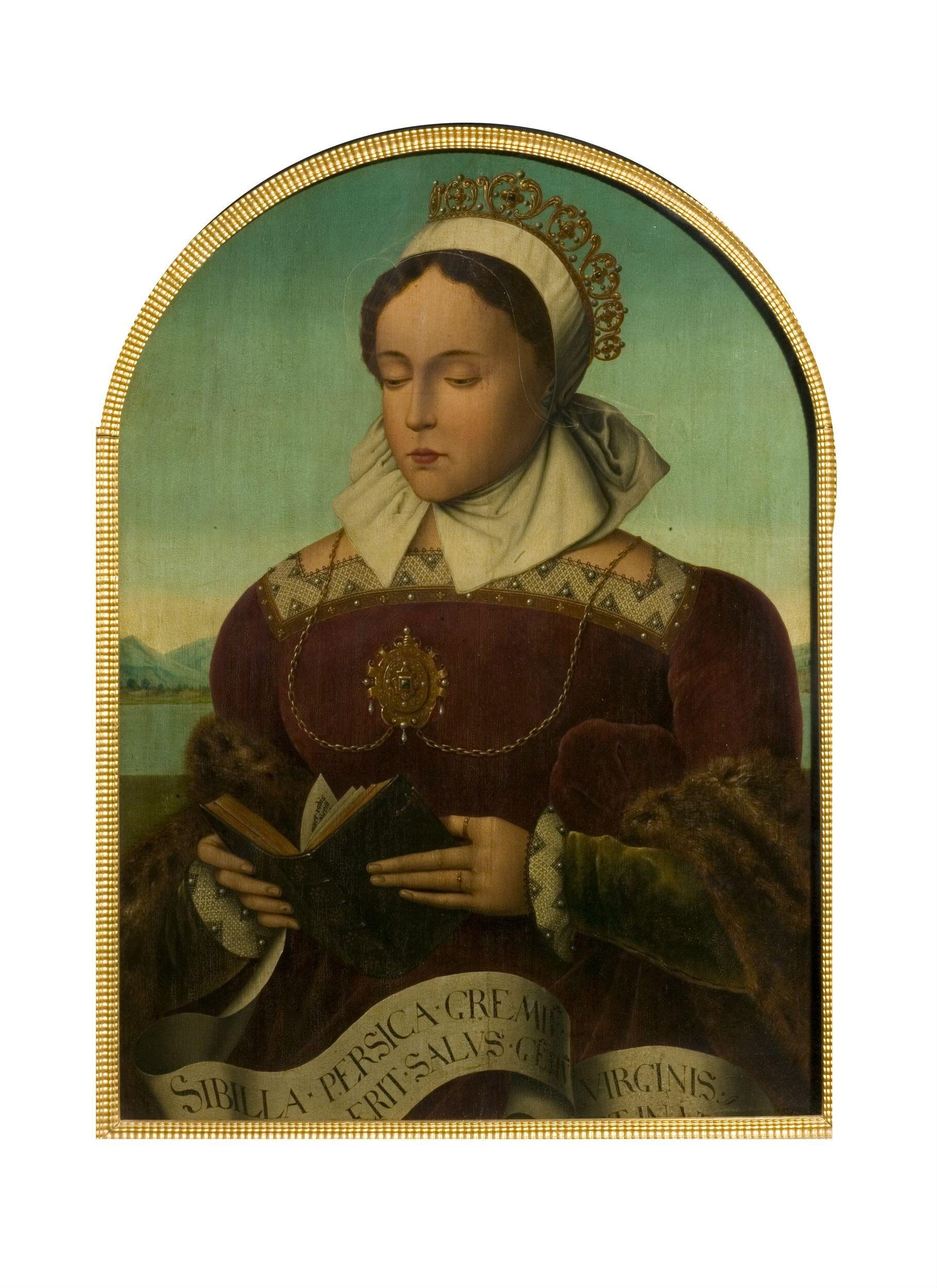
Late 19th-century version of one of his Sibilla Persica paintings, showing a half-length female reading a book held in her hands.

He served as head of the Guild of Saint Luke from 1537 to 1539 and 1543 to 1544. Much of his work was at one time attributed to a Spanish artist known only as the Master of Segovia; it is now believed they were the same person. This is surely the reason why many of his best works can be found in Spanish museums, churches and cathedrals (Prado Museum, Bilbao Fine Arts Museum, Segovia and Burgos Cathedrals, among others).

Perhaps under the influence of Rogier van der Weyden's 15th-century The Magdalen Reading, Benson was one of the first artists to popularise images of women reading. It became a motif for him, and he painted the scene many times in his images of Mary Magdalen and the Sybil Persica, whom he treated as almost interchangeable. A The Magdalen Reading by Benson is held in the National Gallery, London.

Benson died in 1550, in Flanders.

== Gallery ==
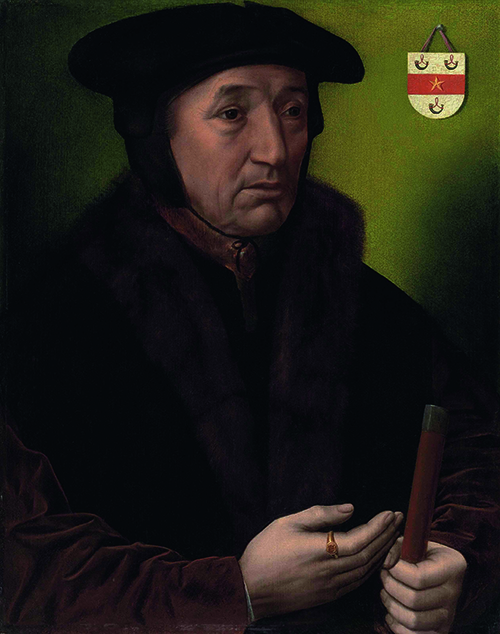
Portrait of Jean Wyts, 1520–1530, The Phoebus Foundation

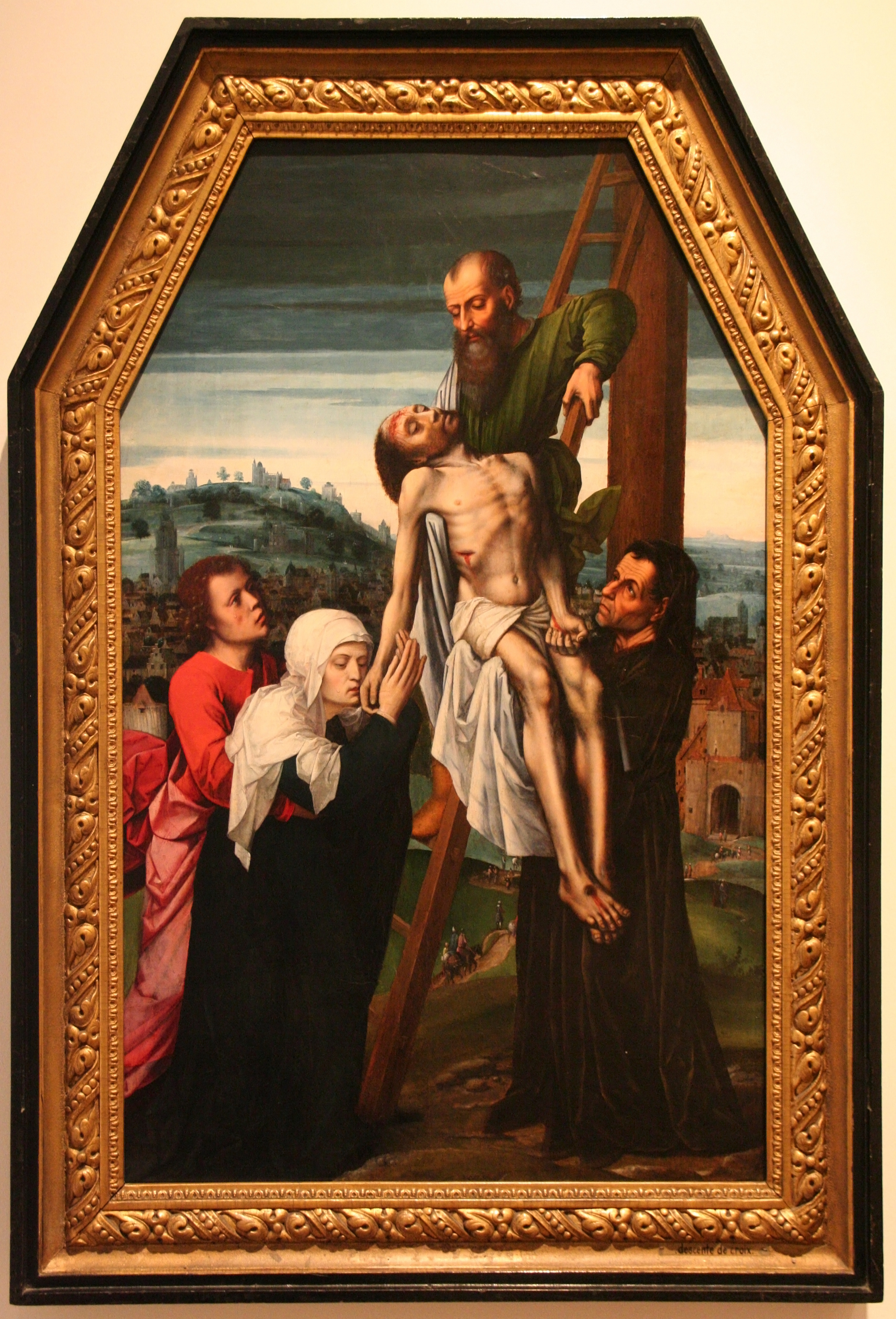
The Descent from the Cross, 1528

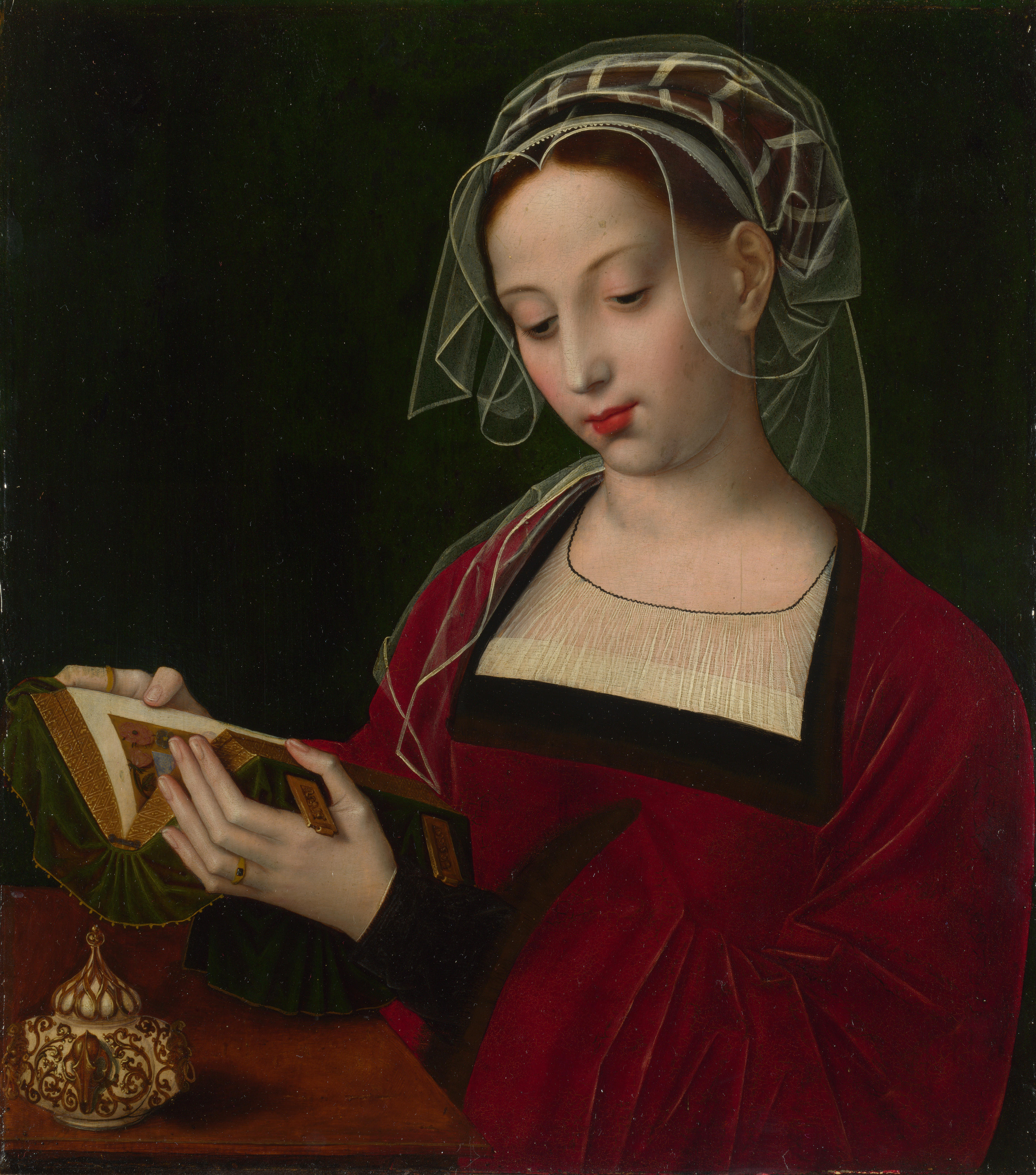
The Magdalen Reading, 1535

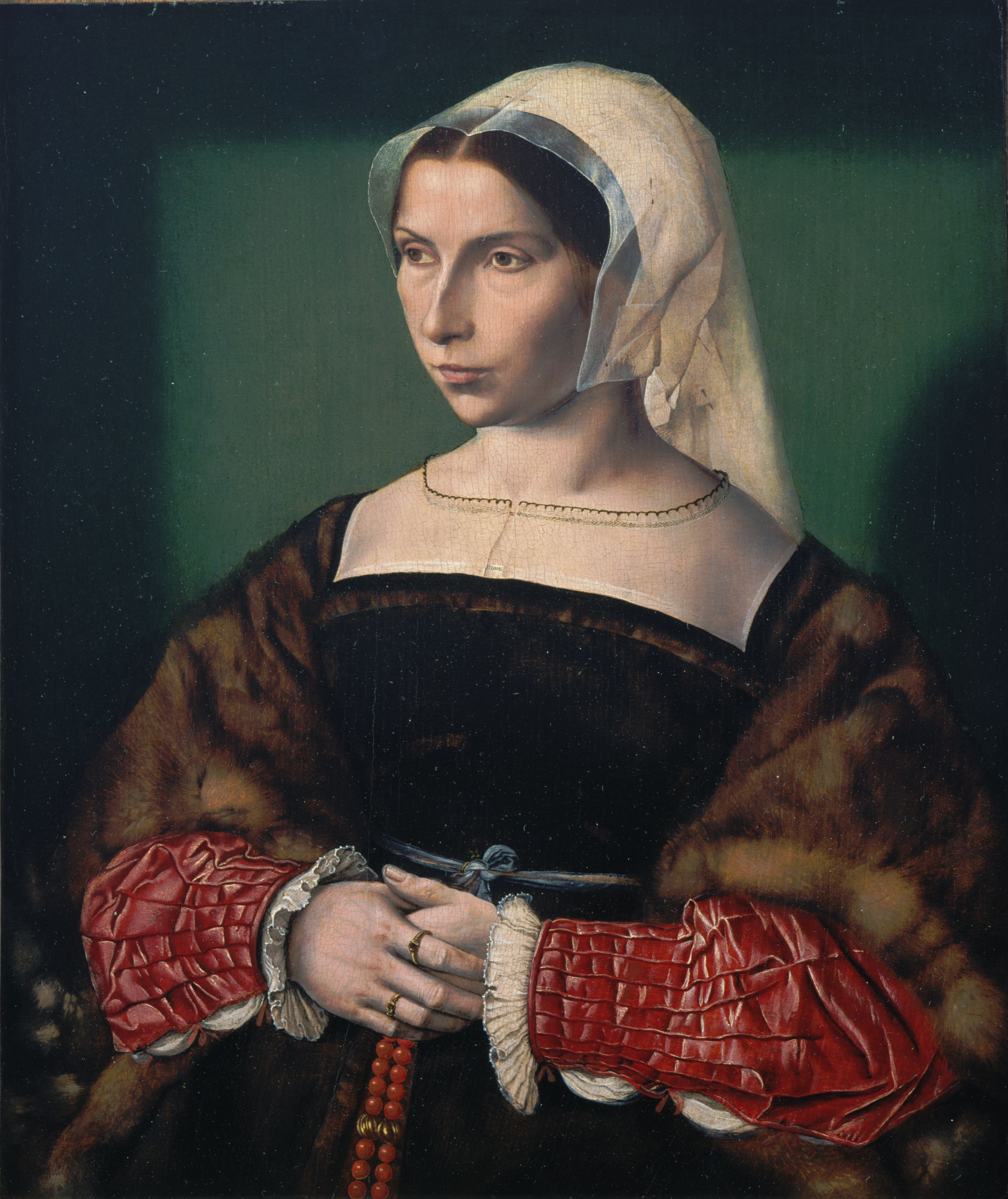
Portrait of Anne Stafford, 1535

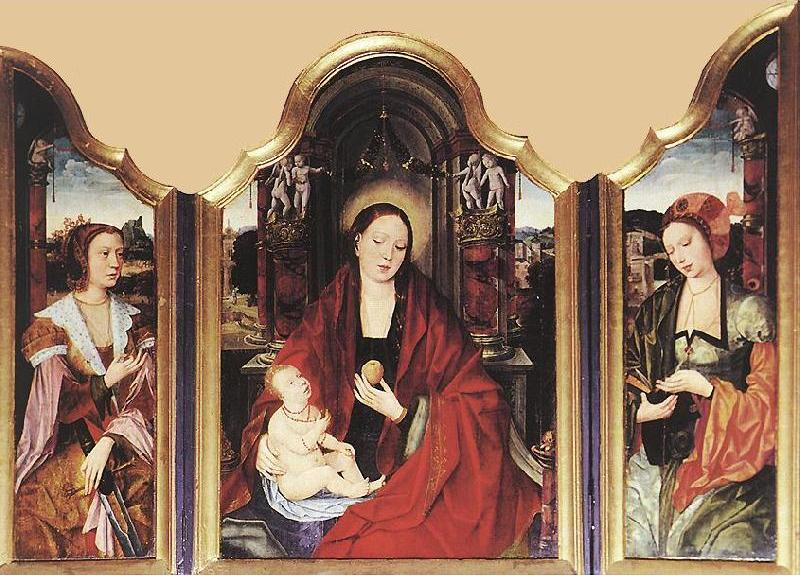
Virgin with Pear, date unknown

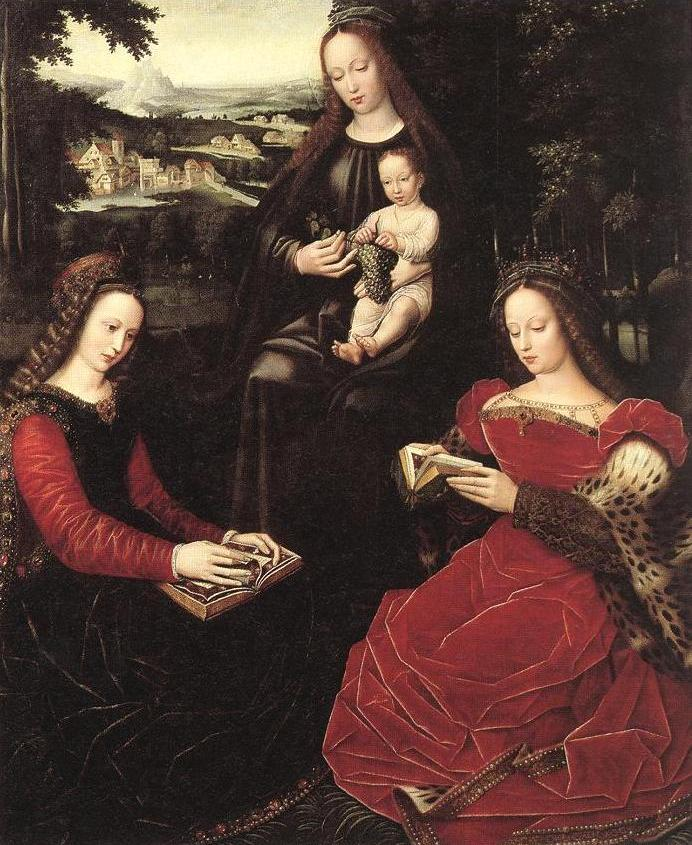
Virgin and Child with Saints, date unknown

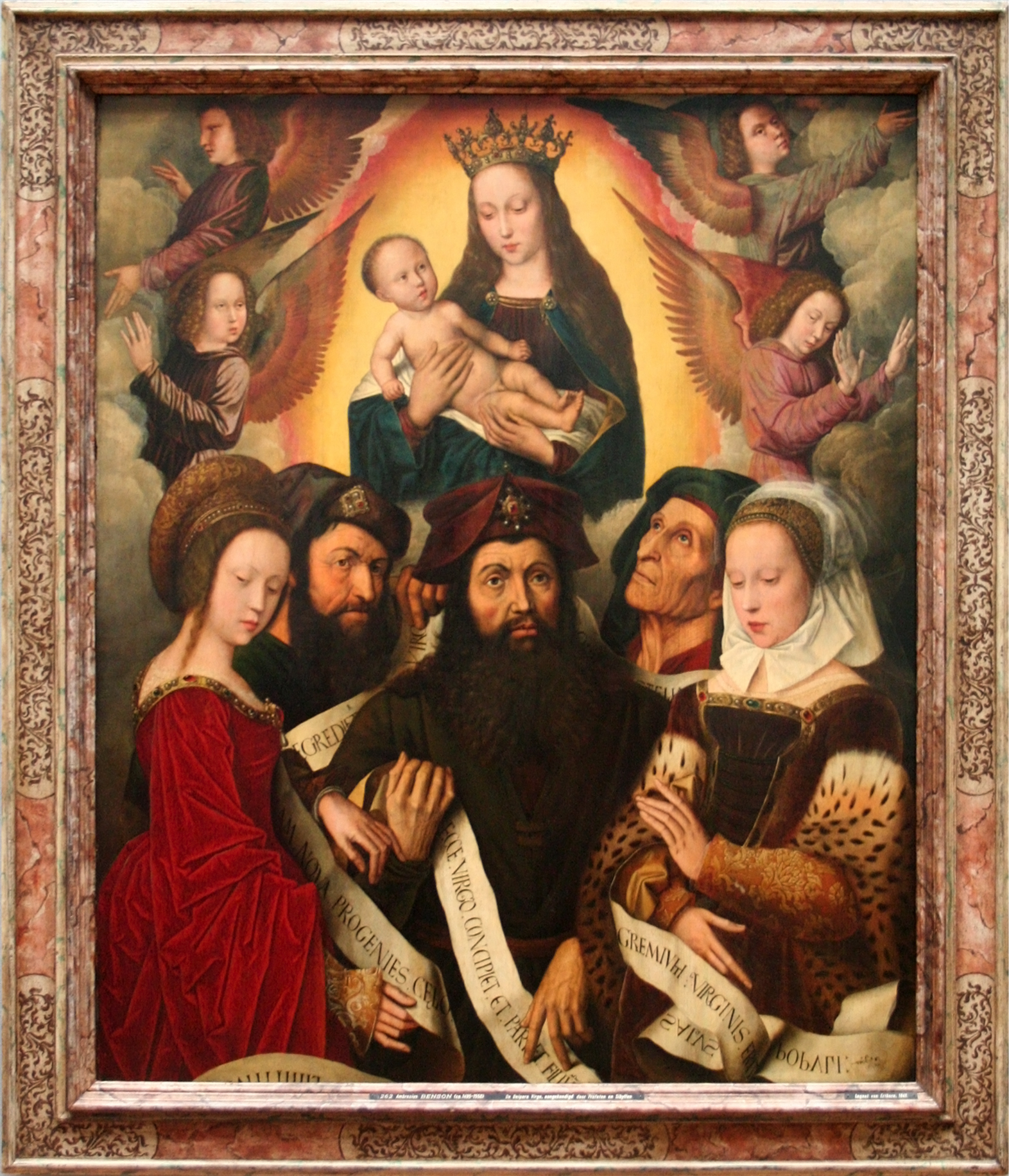
Deipara Virgo, date unknown

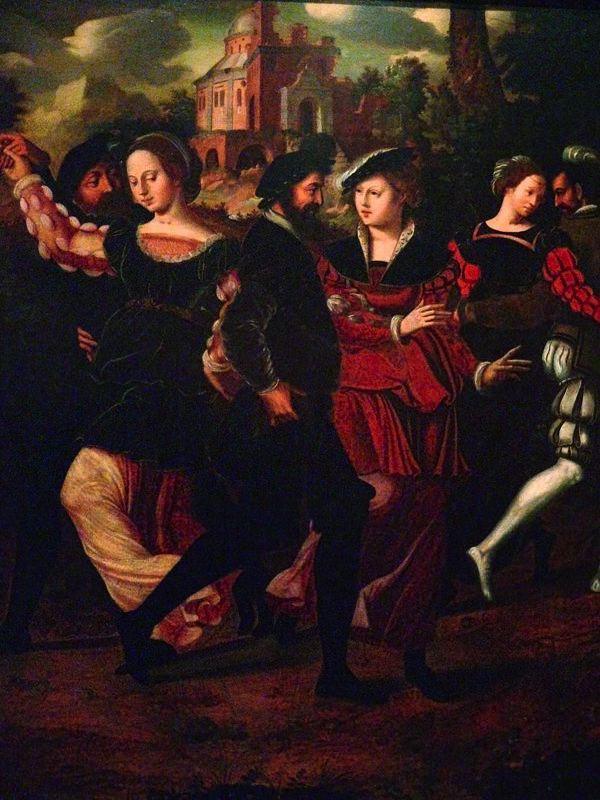
Elegant couples dancing in a landscape, ca. 1540, Utah Museum of Fine Arts (UMFA).

== Sources ==
- Friedländer, Max J. "Ambrosius Benson as a Portrait Painter". "Yearbook of the Prussian art collections", 1910. 31
