= Laird (surname) =

Laird is a surname and a Scottish title. Notable persons with that surname include:

- Alexander Laird (1797–1873), Scottish-Canadian farmer and politician
- Anne Laird (born 1970), Scottish curler
- Brandon Laird (born 1987), baseball player
- Bruce Laird (American football) (born 1950), American football player
- Bruce Laird (born 1950), Australian cricketer
- Carobeth Laird (1895–1983), American anthropologist
- Charlton Laird (1901–1984), American linguist and lexicographer
- Chris Laird (1893–1968), Australian rules footballer
- David Laird (1833–1914), Canadian politician; Lieutenant Governor of Northwest Territories
- Davie Laird (born 1936), Scottish footballer
- Dean S. Laird (1921–2022), WWII U.S. Navy ace
- Elizabeth Laird (author) (born 1943), British writer of children's books
- Elizabeth Laird (physicist) (1874–1969), Canadian physicist
- Emma Laird (born 1998), British actress
- Emil Matthew Laird (1896–1982), American aircraft builder and pilot
- Ethan Laird (born 2001), English footballer
- Flake Laird (1902–1992), American college sports coach
- Gavin Laird (1933–2017), Scottish trade unionist
- Gerald Laird (born 1979), American baseball player
- Helen Laird (1874–1957), Irish actress also known as ‘Honor Lavelle’, a costumier, teacher, and feminist
- Helen M. Laird (1931–2020), electron-microscopist
- Henry Laird (1868–1940), Canadian journalist, merchant and politician
- Jack Laird (potter) (1920–2009), New Zealand potter
- Jack Laird (1923–1991), American television producer, writer, director and actor
- James Laird (politician) (1849–1889), American politician; U.S. representative from Nebraska
- Jenny Laird (1912–2001), British film and television actress
- John Laird (disambiguation)
- Luke Laird (born 1978), American songwriter
- Macgregor Laird (1808–1861), Scottish merchant pioneer on the Niger River
- Marc Laird (born 1986), Scottish football player
- Margaret B. Laird (1871–1968), American women's suffrage leader
- Margaret Heather Laird (1933–2014), British teacher and senior laywoman in the Church of England
- Margaret Nicholl Laird (1897–1983), American Baptist missionary
- Martin Laird (born 1982), Scottish professional golfer
- Martina Laird (born 1971), Trinidadian actress, director and acting teacher
- Marvin Laird (1939–2024), American composer and conductor
- Matthew Laird (born 1977), Canadian politician from British Columbia and author
- Melvin R. Laird, Sr. (1877–1946), American politician, businessman and clergyman
- Melvin R. Laird (1922–2016), American congressman and Secretary of Defense
- Mike Laird (born 1974), American BMX rider
- Nan Laird (born 1943), American professor of biostatistics
- Nick Laird (born 1975), Northern Ireland novelist and poet
- Norman Laird (1906–1970), Northern Ireland doctor and politician
- Patrick Laird (born 1995), American football player
- Paul Laird (born 1958), American musicologist
- Peter Laird (born 1954), American comic book artist
- Philip Johnson-Laird (born 1936), American psychologist and author
- Rick Laird (1941–2021), Irish jazz musician
- Robbin Laird (born 1946), American military and defense analyst
- Ron Laird (born 1938), American race walker
- Rory Laird (born 1993), Australian rules football player
- Ryan Laird (born 1984), Canadian country music singer-songwriter
- Sally Laird (1956–2010), British editor and translator of Russian literature
- Sandy Laird (1901–?), Scottish footballer
- Scott Laird (born 1988), English football player
- Stephen Laird (1915–1990), American journalist; alleged to be a Soviet spy in the 1930s
- Stu Laird (born 1960), Canadian Football League player
- Susan Laird (1908–1933), American competition swimmer
- Trevor Laird (born 1957), English actor
- Walter Laird (1920–2002), British Latin-American dancer
- William Laird (disambiguation)
- Willie Laird (20th century), Scottish association football player

== Alternate spellings ==
In the United States, the surname Laird has many different spellings, presumably due to U.S. oral census takers.

- Laird
- Lard
- Leard
- Leaird
- Leird
- MacLaird
- McLeaird
- McLeard

== See also ==
- Laird (disambiguation)
