= Laird (disambiguation) =

Laird is a hereditary title in Scotland.

Laird or Lairds may also refer to:

== People ==
- Laird (given name)
- Laird (surname)

== Places ==
=== Antarctica ===
- Cape Laird, Ross Dependency
- Laird Glacier, Ross Dependency
- Laird Plateau, Oates Land

=== Canada ===
- Laird, Ontario, a township and village
- Laird, Saskatchewan, a village
- Rural Municipality of Laird No. 404, Saskatchewan, a rural municipality

=== United States ===
- Laird, Colorado, a census-designated place
- Laird Township, Michigan
- Laird Township, Phelps County, Nebraska
- Lairds Creek, a river in Kansas
- Hopewell, Benton County, Mississippi, formerly Laird, an unincorporated community

=== Outer space ===
- 16192 Laird, a main-belt asteroid

== Enterprises ==
- Laird & Company, a New Jersey distillery that is the oldest in the United States
- Laird plc, a British electronics and technology business

== Schools ==
- Laird School of Art, Birkenhead, Merseyside, England
