= Lard (disambiguation) =

Lard is pig fat.

Lard may also refer to:

== Persons ==
- Lard (surname)

== Place names ==
- Rivière au Lard, a tributary of the Champlain River in Mauricie, Quebec, Canada
- Lard, Iran (disambiguation), villages in Iran

== Arts ==
- Keith Lard, a fictional character in That Peter Kay Thing television series
- Marc Riley (b. 1961), British musician formerly known by the pseudonym Lard
- Lard (band), a U.S. hardcore punk/industrial band

== See also ==
- Lardon, a small strip or cube of pork fat
- Laird, a heritable title in Scotland
