= Carlos Peña =

Dominican baseball player (born 1978)

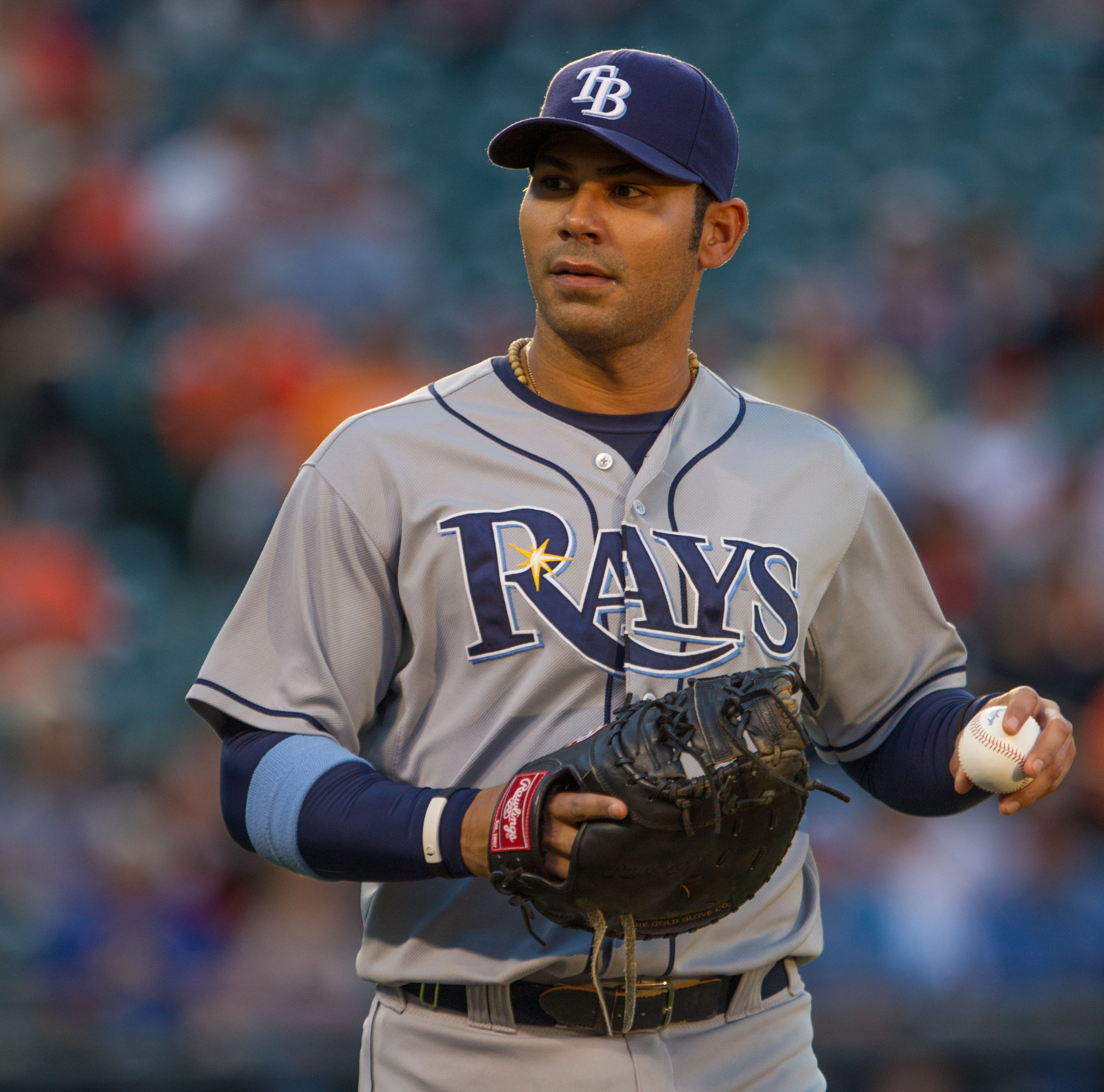
- Peña with the Tampa Bay Rays in 2012

Leones del Escogido
- First baseman / General manager
- Born: May 17, 1978 (age 48); Santo Domingo, Dominican Republic
- Batted: Left Threw: Left

MLB debut
- September 5, 2001, for the Texas Rangers

Last MLB appearance
- July 12, 2014, for the Texas Rangers

MLB statistics
- Batting average: .232
- Home runs: 286
- Runs batted in: 818
- Stats at Baseball Reference

Teams
- Texas Rangers (2001); Oakland Athletics (2002); Detroit Tigers (2002–2005); Boston Red Sox (2006); Tampa Bay Devil Rays / Rays (2007–2010); Chicago Cubs (2011); Tampa Bay Rays (2012); Houston Astros (2013); Kansas City Royals (2013); Texas Rangers (2014)

Career highlights and awards
- All-Star (2009); Gold Glove Award (2008); Silver Slugger Award (2007); AL Comeback Player of the Year (2007); AL home run leader (2009)

Carlos Felipe Peña (born May 17, 1978) is a Dominican former professional baseball first baseman and current broadcaster. He played in Major League Baseball (MLB) for the Texas Rangers, Oakland Athletics, Detroit Tigers, Boston Red Sox, Tampa Bay Devil Rays/Rays, Chicago Cubs, Houston Astros, and Kansas City Royals.

Although Peña was born in Santo Domingo and his family is from San Francisco de Macorís, he spent a significant portion of his childhood in the United States.

== Early life ==
Peña is the second-oldest of five children born to Felipe and Juana Marisela Peña. The family moved to the United States from the Dominican Republic when Peña was 12, initially living with one of his uncles.

Peña graduated from Haverhill High School in Haverhill, Massachusetts, in 1995. He initially went to Wright State University in Dayton, Ohio, but returned home after one year and attended Northeastern University in Boston; there, Peña studied electrical engineering. As a collegiate player, he competed in the Cape Cod Baseball League (CCBL), which showcases top amateur prospects every summer. Peña was a member of the Harwich Mariners in 1996 and the Wareham Gatemen in 1997. In 1997, he was named CCBL league MVP and was inducted into the CCBL Hall of Fame in 2003. During his time at Northeastern, Peña led the Northeastern Huskies to one NCAA tournament. Peña's career batting average at Northeastern was .324 and he finished with 24 home runs in two seasons.

== Professional career ==
=== Texas Rangers ===
Peña was selected in the first round (10th pick overall) by the Texas Rangers in the 1998 Major League Baseball draft.

Peña played for three different Rangers affiliates in 1998. Prior to the 1999 season, Peña was named by Baseball America as the 93rd prospect in their top 100 prospects list. In 1999, Peña played for the Charlotte Rangers, the Rangers Advanced Single-A team. He batted .255 with 18 home runs in 138 games.

Peña was promoted to the Double-A Tulsa Drillers in 2000, where he batted .299 with 28 home runs and 105 RBI in 138 games.

Peña appeared in Baseball America's top 100 prospect list in 2001, this time at number eleven and was the Rangers' top prospect. He advanced another level in 2001, this time playing for the Oklahoma Redhawks, the Rangers' Triple-A affiliate. He played in 119 games for the Redhawks, in which he batted .288 with 23 home runs and 74 RBIs. Peña was also a Triple-A All-Star in 2001.

Following the 2001 minor league season, the Rangers called Peña up to the big leagues during September, when rosters expand. He made his big league debut on September 5, starting at first base, wearing number 15, and going hitless in three at-bats. Peña finished the 2001 season with a .258 batting average and three home runs in 22 games played.

=== Oakland Athletics ===
On January 14, 2002, along with Mike Venafro, Peña was traded by the Rangers to the Oakland Athletics for Jason Hart, Gerald Laird, Ryan Ludwick, and Mario Ramos.

In 40 games with the A's, Peña hit .218 with seven home runs and 16 RBIs. During a stint with Triple-A Sacramento from July 2–5, he hit .438 with two home runs and six RBIs.

Peña was mentioned several times in Michael Lewis' 2003 book Moneyball and was a minor character in the 2011 film based on the book. He is portrayed in the film by actor Gerardo Celasco (credited as Adrian Bellani).

=== Detroit Tigers ===
Peña was involved in a three team deal on July 6, 2002. The Athletics sent Peña, a player to be named later (later named as Jeremy Bonderman), and Franklyn Germán to the Detroit Tigers. The New York Yankees sent Ted Lilly, John-Ford Griffin, and Jason Arnold to the Athletics. The Tigers sent Jeff Weaver to the Yankees and cash to the Athletics.

The Tigers acquired Peña due to a season-ending injury to designated hitter Dmitri Young and the first baseman at the time of the trade for the Tigers, Randall Simon, immediately became the Tigers' designated hitter following Peña's acquisition.

Peña made his Tigers' debut the next day against the Boston Red Sox, as he went 3–4 with 2 doubles and 2 RBIs. Peña played in 75 games for the Tigers in 2002 and batted .253 with 12 home runs and 36 RBIs. Overall, he batted .242 with 19 home runs and 52 RBIs in 115 games. His 2002 season included a 12-game hitting streak from September 8–21, which tied teammate Omar Infante for the longest hitting streak for an American League rookie in 2002.

Peña played in his first full season in 2003 as the Tigers' everyday first baseman. On May 19, against the Cleveland Indians, he established career highs with 3 home runs and 7 RBIs. Peña also missed nearly a month in June when he suffered a left calf strain. He played in 131 games for the Tigers in 2003 and batted .248 with 18 home runs and 59 RBIs.

In 2004, Peña established career highs in games played (142), at bats (481), hits (116), doubles (22), home runs (27), runs scored (89), RBIs (82), total bases (227), stolen bases (7), walks (70), and strikeouts (146). Peña also batted .241 in 2004.

On May 27, 2004, against the Kansas City Royals, Peña matched a Tigers' nine-inning, single-game record with a career-high six hits. He became the fifth player in franchise history to do so and the first since Damion Easley on August 8, 2001, against the Texas Rangers. He batted in the eighth spot in the batting order and his six hits were the most from the eighth spot since Wilbert Robinson of the Baltimore Orioles collected seven hits on June 10, 1892 against St. Louis.

Peña began the 2005 season as the Tigers' starting first baseman. After playing in 40 games in which he batted .181 with three home runs and 14 RBIs, Peña was demoted to the Triple-A Toledo Mud Hens, where he played in 71 games for the Mud Hens and batted .311 with 12 home runs and 71 RBIs. Following an injury to shortstop Carlos Guillén, Peña was recalled on August 17. Following his recall, he hit 15 home runs in 38 games. Overall, he played in 79 games for the Tigers in 2005, and batted .235 with 18 home runs and 44 RBIs.

In Spring training during 2006, Peña batted .160 with one home run and four RBIs in 17 games for the Tigers, and the Tigers released him on March 26, 2006.

While with the Tigers, Peña hit the longest home run, a 461-foot blast, in Comerica Park history.

=== New York Yankees ===
Peña signed a minor league contract with the New York Yankees on April 15, 2006. He played at the Triple-A level for the Columbus Clippers. Playing in 105 games, Peña batted .260 with 19 home runs and 66 RBIs. He exercised a clause in his contract and became a free agent on August 16.

=== Boston Red Sox ===
On August 17, 2006, Peña signed a minor league contract with the Red Sox and was assigned to Triple-A Pawtucket. At Pawtucket, Peña played in 11 games and batted .459 with 4 home runs and 8 RBIs. His contract was purchased on August 28. On September 4, Peña hit his only home run of the season. He was a defensive replacement and when he batted in the bottom of the tenth, he hit a walk-off home run off Brandon McCarthy of the Chicago White Sox.

Peña ended up playing in 18 games for the Red Sox in 2006. He batted .273 with 1 home run and three RBIs. Following the season, he opted for free agency.

=== Tampa Bay Devil Rays ===
Peña signed a minor league contract with the Tampa Bay Devil Rays on February 1, 2007 with an invitation to spring training. The Rays reassigned Peña to minor league camp. With a knee injury to Greg Norton on the last day of spring training, the Rays re-signed him, this time to a Major League contract on April 1.

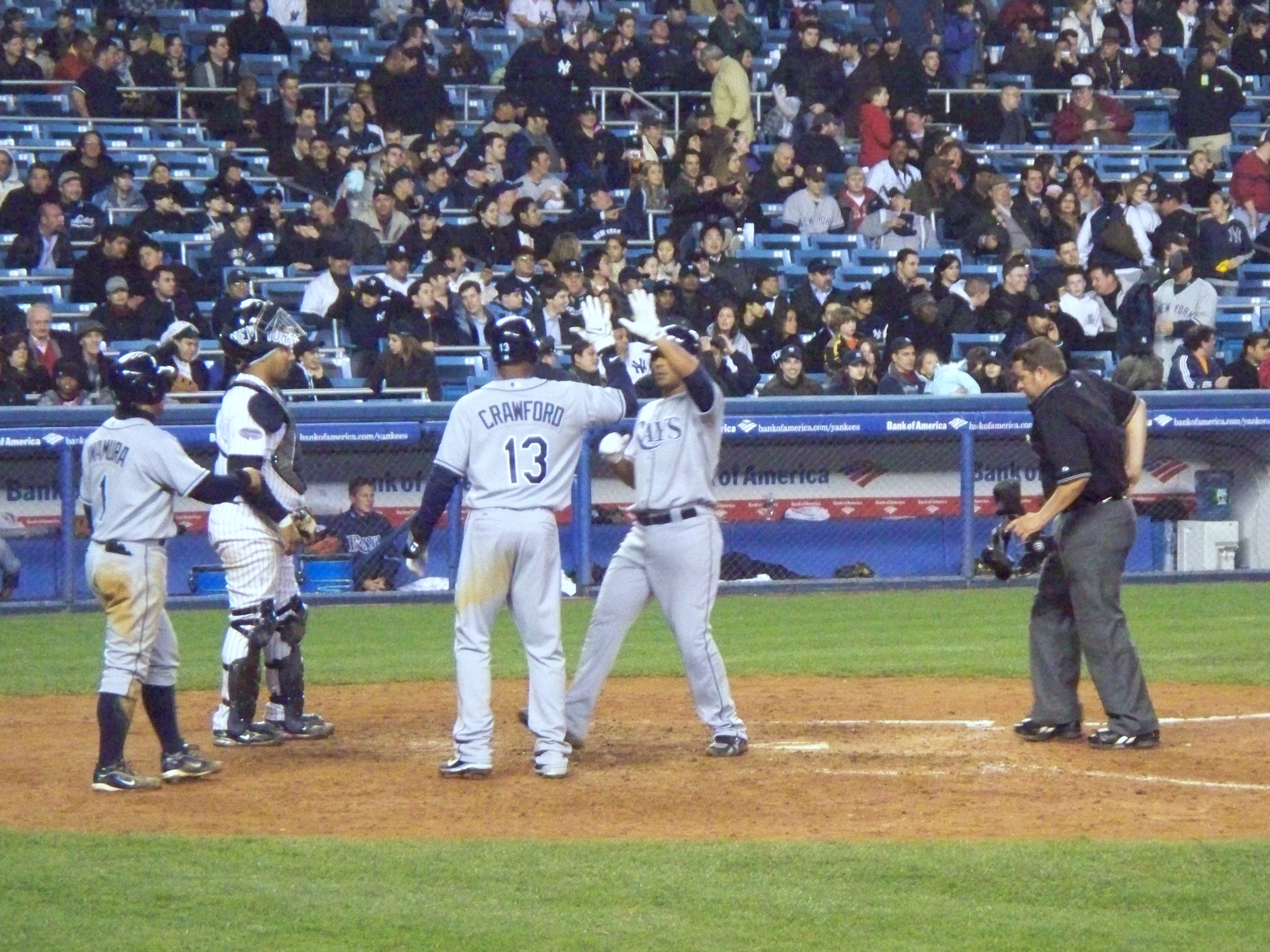
Peña is congratulated by Carl Crawford and Akinori Iwamura after hitting a three-run home run against the Yankees on April 4, 2008

Peña was on the Rays' active roster throughout the 2007 season. Peña had a slow start to his 2007 season, batting .213 with four home runs in the month of April as a backup player. Peña hit .356 with six home runs and 15 RBIs in May as an everyday player and was the Rays' first baseman for the rest of the season. He had four multi-home run games from August 26 to September 22.

Peña would go on to have the best season of his career in 2007 and set numerous career highs. He finished the season with a .282 batting average, 46 home runs and 121 RBIs. His batting average, home runs, and RBIs were career highs, as well as games played (148), at bats (490), runs scored (99), doubles (29), total bases (307), on-base percentage (.411), slugging percentage (.627), walks (103), and strikeouts (142). He was second in the American League in home runs to Alex Rodriguez' 54, and first in at bats per home run (10.7). His home run, RBI, slugging percentage, on-base percentage and walk totals also set Rays franchise records. In 2007, he had the lowest range factor of all AL league first basemen, 8.73. Peña's season led to his being named the 2007 American League Comeback Player of the Year and he was considered as an AL MVP candidate. He also was named the Player's Choice AL Comeback Player of the Year by fellow players. Peña was allowed to donate $20,000 to Dominican youth under the poverty line.

In 2008, Peña had .227 batting average and 11 home runs in 207 at-bats through June 4, 2008. A day after going 2-for-3 with a home run and three runs batted in against the Boston Red Sox, Peña was placed on the fifteen-day disabled placed on June 4, 2008 due to a broken finger. He returned to action from the disabled list on June 27, and finished the season with a .247 batting average, 31 home runs, and 102 RBIs. Peña homered once every 15.8 at-bats, the highest ratio on the Rays. One of his home runs, on September 19 against the Minnesota Twins, was the result of the first call overturned by instant replay in MLB history. After the 2008 season ended, he was awarded his first (and also the first for a Tampa Bay Rays franchise player) AL Gold Glove.

Peña was elected for the 2009 Major League Baseball All-Star Game, replacing Dustin Pedroia and participated in the 2009 Home Run Derby where he lost in a bat-off against Albert Pujols in the first round. On September 7, 2009, Peña suffered two broken fingers after getting hit by a pitch, which put him out for the rest of the 2009 season. Despite missing the last few weeks of the season, he still finished tied for the lead for home runs in the American League at 39 with Mark Teixeira of the New York Yankees. He also led the AL in at bats per home run (12.1) despite having the lowest batting average of all qualified hitters (.227). Peña's three-year contract with the Rays, reported by the St. Petersburg Times as worth $24.125 million, expired at the end of the 2010 season.

In 2010 with the Rays, Peña hit 28 home runs drove in 84 runs and finished the season with a .196 batting average (below the Mendoza Line), the lowest average of anyone in the Majors who qualified for the batting title. He also started 135 games at first base for the Rays and played in 144 games.

In the 2010 American League Division Series against Texas, Peña got his first triple of the year off Rangers starter Tommy Hunter in Game 4 on October 10, helping the Rays even the playoff series at two games apiece. The day before, he had gone 2-for-3 with a home run. The Rays would lose the series, 3–2.

=== Chicago Cubs ===
On December 8, 2010, Peña signed a one-year contract with the Chicago Cubs worth $10 million. He received $5 million in 2011 and $5 million in January 2012, counted against the 2011 payroll. In 153 games, Peña hit .225 with 28 home runs and 80 RBIs as Chicago's starting first baseman.

=== Second stint with the Tampa Bay Rays ===
On January 20, 2012, Peña returned to the Rays for a second stint, signing a 1-year, $7.25 million deal. He was introduced four days later on January 24 after passing a physical earlier in the day. He returned to his #23 uniform number he had in his previous tenure with the Rays.

During opening day on April 6, 2012 against the Yankees, Peña hit a grand slam off of CC Sabathia in his first at-bat and later, the game-winning hit off of Mariano Rivera to seal a 7–6 victory for the Rays.

Peña played in 160 games, serving as the primary first baseman and occasional DH. He finished the 2012 season with a .197 average (lowest among all qualified MLB batters), 19 home runs, and 61 RBI.

=== Houston Astros ===
On December 17, 2012, Peña signed a one-year deal with the Houston Astros, worth $2.9 million with another $1.4 million in incentives, to be their designated hitter in their inaugural American League season. On July 21, 2013, Peña was designated for assignment. He was released by the Astros on July 31, 2013.

=== Kansas City Royals ===
Peña was signed to a minor league contract by the Kansas City Royals on August 28, 2013. He played in 4 games for the Royals with three hitless at bats before the end of the season.

=== Los Angeles Angels of Anaheim ===
On January 28, 2014, Peña along with Brennan Boesch, signed a minor league contract with the Los Angeles Angels of Anaheim. The contract included an invitation to spring training. On March 23, Peña was released by the Angels.

=== Second stint with the Rangers ===
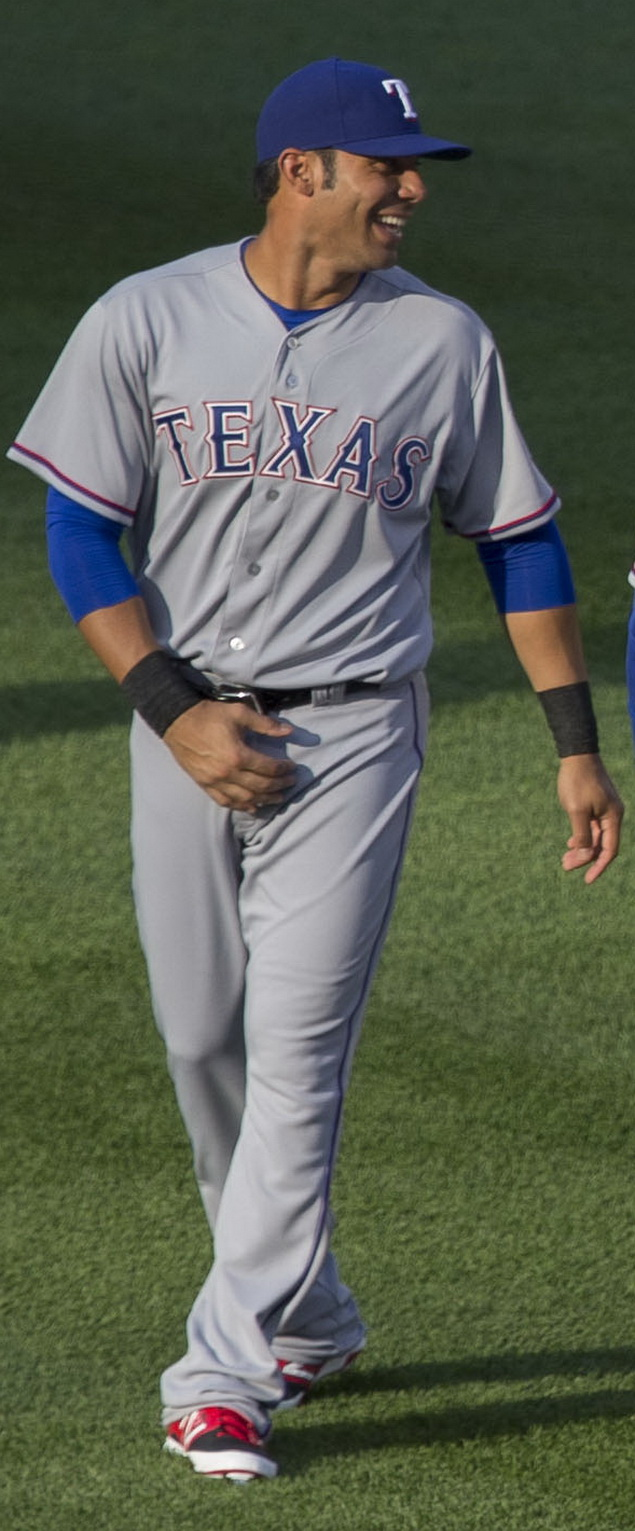
Peña with the Rangers in 2014

On June 17, 2014, Peña signed a minor league deal to return to the Rangers. He was called up on June 24. He played 18 games for the Rangers, batting .136/.190/.237 with 2 RBI in 59 at bats before being designated for assignment on July 17. On August 17, Peña was officially released by the Rangers.

After remaining out of the game for over a year, failing to find another team to play for, Peña signed a one-day contract with the Tampa Bay Rays so he could officially retire as a member of the team.

Peña first became eligible for the National Baseball Hall of Fame during the 2020 balloting, but he received no votes and was removed from future consideration.

== Post-playing career ==
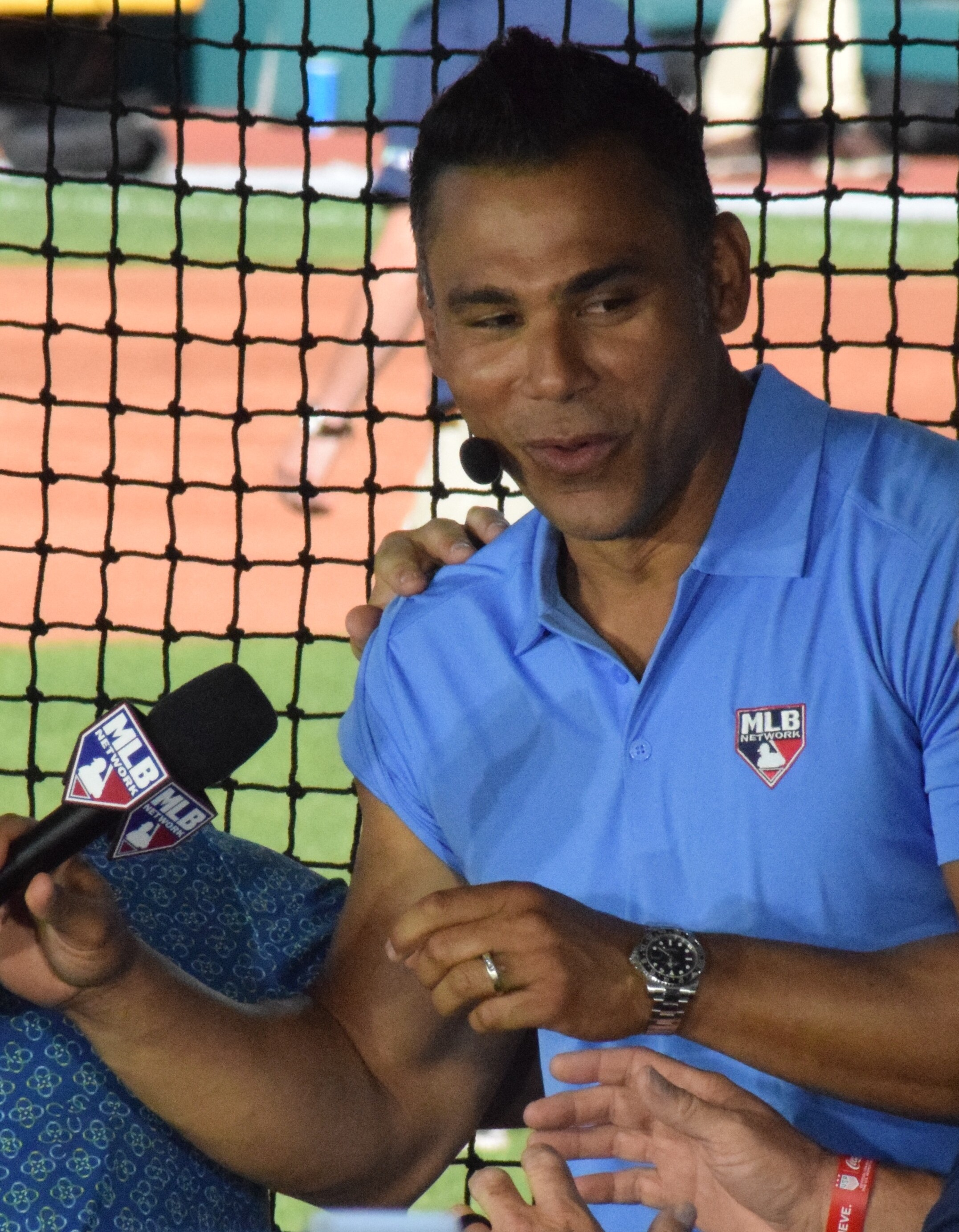
Peña broadcasting the 2019 Major League Baseball All-Star Game

In December 2014, MLB Network announced that Peña had joined its team as a studio analyst.

In September 2017, Peña appeared on New England Sports Network (NESN) as a studio analyst, and also worked as a color commentator with Jerry Remy and play-by-play announcer Dave O'Brien during the Red Sox' final series of the regular season, against the Houston Astros.

In 2018, Peña was featured on a Season 7 episode of Impractical Jokers during a punishment for Joe Gatto, one of the Jokers.

In February 2019, Peña was announced as part of the NESN broadcast team for the Red Sox' 2019 season, to fill in when regular color commentators Jerry Remy and Dennis Eckersley are not available.

Peña also contributed to Cubs Postgame Live on Marquee Sports Network.

In January 2024, Peña was announced as part of the Detroit Tigers Bally Sports Detroit broadcast team for the Tigers' 2024 season, to handle color commentary for multiple games alongside play-by-play announcers Jason Benetti and Dan Dickerson.

In May 2025, Peña was announced as general manager of the Leones del Escogido of LIDOM.

== Personal life ==
In the wake of the 2010 Haiti earthquake, Peña donated food and medical supplies to the victims and made fundraising appearances, which he described as, "people uniting for a good cause, people showing their good heart". Peña is also a spokesman for Big Brothers Big Sisters of America and, in 2008, was the Rays' nominee for the Roberto Clemente Award, given for exemplifying on-field achievement and sportsmanship with off-field community service. He has also worked with Uncork for a Cause and "Rays on the Runway" charity event held by his former team. Carlos and his wife, Pamela, have three children.

== See also ==
- List of Major League Baseball annual home run leaders
- List of Major League Baseball career home run leaders
- List of Major League Baseball single-game hits leaders
