= William Laird =

William or Bill Laird is the name of:

- Bill Laird (ice hockey) (1891–1953), Canadian ice hockey goalkeeper
- William Laird (shipbuilder) (1780–1841), Scottish shipbuilder and entrepreneur who founded the Cammell Laird shipyard at Birkenhead, England
- William Laird (Canadian politician) (1835–1911), politician on Prince Edward Island, Canada
- William Laird III (1916–1974), United States Senator from West Virginia
- William Laird IV (born 1952), former member of the West Virginia House of Delegates and West Virginia Senate
- William Laird (footballer), Scottish footballer for Sunderland
