= Mario Ramos =

American baseball player (born 1977)

- Pitcher
- Born: October 19, 1977 (age 48); Aurora, Illinois, U.S.
- Batted: Left Threw: Left

MLB debut
- June 19, 2003, for the Texas Rangers

Last MLB appearance
- June 29, 2003, for the Texas Rangers

MLB statistics
- Record: 1-1
- Earned run average: 6.23
- Strikeouts: 8
- Stats at Baseball Reference

Teams
- Texas Rangers (2003)

Mario Martin Ramos (born October 19, 1977) is an American former Major League Baseball pitcher.

Ramos was born in Aurora, Illinois. He went to Pflugerville High School in Pflugerville, Texas, where he also resides today. He was a 5'11", 180-pound pitcher. Before being drafted, Ramos attended Rice University.

In 1996, the Kansas City Royals drafted him in the 48th round (1399th overall). He decided not to sign and continued to pitch for Rice. In 1999, he was drafted by the Oakland Athletics in the 6th round (183rd)—this time he signed.

From 2000–2001, Ramos had a 30-9 record in the minors. On January 14, 2002, he was traded to the Texas Rangers along with Jason Hart, Gerald Laird and Ryan Ludwick for Carlos Peña and Mike Venafro.

From 2002–2003, his winning percentage dropped to .379 (11-18 record). That trade, it seems, had a very bad effect on his career. Even though he had a mediocre (at best) season in the minors in 2003, he was still called up to the Rangers. On June 19, he made his major league debut.

At the end of 2003, he was selected off waivers from the Rangers by the team who drafted him, the Oakland Athletics. Even though he was rumored to be part of a deal being concocted between the Los Angeles Dodgers and Athletics for Milton Bradley, he was not traded, and he remained in the Athletics' farm system.

From 2004 through 2005, he played in the Athletics farm system. In 2006, he was with the San Diego Padres in their system. He was back in the Athletics system in 2007.

Ramos was a teammate of Marc Gwyn, Jason Hart and Ryan Ludwick for four years — longer than any other teammates. His cousin, Dominic Ramos, also plays professional baseball. Since 2019-2020, Ramos is a 6th grade principal of Cele Middle School.

== Honors and awards ==
- In 1999, he was a Second Team College All-American and a Western Athletic Conference All-Star.
- In 2000, he was a California League All-Star and a High A All-Star.
- In 2001, he was a Baseball America Second Team Minor League All-Star and the Oakland Athletics Minor League Player of the Year.
