= Jason Hart (baseball) =

American baseball player & coach (born 1977)

- Outfielder / First baseman
- Born: September 5, 1977 (age 48); Walnut Creek, California, U.S.
- Batted: Right Threw: Right

MLB debut
- August 18, 2002, for the Texas Rangers

Last MLB appearance
- September 29, 2002, for the Texas Rangers

MLB statistics
- Batting average: .267
- Home runs: 0
- Runs batted in: 0
- Stats at Baseball Reference

Teams
- As player: Texas Rangers (2002); As coach: Miami Marlins (2023–2024)

Jason Wyatt Hart (born September 5, 1977) is an American former professional baseball outfielder and first baseman. He played in Major League Baseball (MLB) for the Texas Rangers in 2002.

== High school and college ==
Standing at 6'4" and weighing 240 pounds, Hart attended Fair Grove High School and was originally drafted by the Atlanta Braves in the 20th round of the 1995 Major League Baseball draft. He opted to play college baseball at Southwest Missouri State University. In 1997, he played collegiate summer baseball with the Chatham A's of the Cape Cod Baseball League. He was a 2nd-team college All-American and a Missouri Valley Conference All-Star in 1998. He was selected by the Oakland Athletics in the fifth round of the 1998 Major League Baseball draft, and signed with the club.

== Professional career ==
He began his professional career in 1998 with the Southern Oregon Timberjacks, hitting .258 with 20 home runs and 69 RBI with them. He led or tied for the Northwest League lead in games played, home runs and RBI. He earned a trip to the All-Star game and the Northwest League MVP Award that season.

Playing for the Modesto A's in 1999, Hart hit .305 with 19 home runs, 48 doubles and 123 RBI in 550 at-bats. Once again, he topped his league (the California League) in multiple categories, those being: at-bats, doubles and RBI.

In 2000, Hart had another outstanding season. He spent most of the season with the Double-A Midland RockHounds, hitting .326 with 44 doubles, 30 home runs and 121 RBI for them. He led the Texas League in at-bats, hits, and RBI. Although he spent most of the year with the Rockhounds, he also played five games for the Triple-A Sacramento River Cats, hitting .278 with one home run, one double and four RBI in 18 at-bats. Overall, he hit .324 with 45 doubles, 31 home runs and 125 RBI. He was a Baseball America All-Star, a Double-A All-Star and a Texas League All-Star. Indeed, he was developing into a minor league star.

According to Baseball America, Hart was ranked the 59th best prospect in baseball and the second best prospect in the Athletics organization in 2001. Despite that, he slumped that year while playing for the River Cats. In 494 at-bats, he hit .247 with 19 home runs and 75 RBI.

On January 14, 2002, Hart was traded with Gerald Laird, Ryan Ludwick, and Mario Ramos to the Rangers for Carlos Peña and Mike Venafro. Although he slumped mightily in 2001, Baseball America still named him the 10th best prospect in the Rangers organization in 2002.

Indeed, he did show some improvement in 2002, hitting .263 with 25 home runs and 83 RBI for the Triple-A Oklahoma City RedHawks. He earned a call-up to the big leagues that season, and on August 18 he made his debut, at the age of 24. Facing the Toronto Blue Jays, he appeared as a pinch hitter for Mike Lamb in his first plate appearance and drew a walk. Overall, Hart would appear in 10 games, hitting .267 with three of his four hits being doubles. He appeared in his final big league game on September 29 of that season.

Although he did not play in the big leagues after 2002, he stuck around in the minors until 2006. In 2003, he again played for Oklahoma, hitting .252 with 21 home runs and 82 RBI.

In 2004, Hart was diagnosed with a brain tumor and did not play. He did, however, play for the Double-A Frisco RoughRiders in 2005. With them, he hit .246 with 21 home runs and 77 RBI. On October 15, he was granted free agency. He was signed by the Minnesota Twins on December 14.

Hart began the 2006 season with the Triple-A Rochester Red Wings. In 30 games with them, he hit .225 with four home runs and eight RBI. On June 1, he was sent back to the Rangers as part of a conditional deal. He finished the season with Oklahoma, hitting .254 with 14 home runs and 45 RBI. Combined, Hart hit .248 with 18 home runs and 53 RBI in his final professional season.

In total, Hart hit .271 with 174 home runs, 243 doubles, and 687 RBI in eight minor league seasons.

== Coaching career ==
In 2008, Hart assisted the Single-A Clinton LumberKings in the Rangers organization. Hart was the hitting coach for the Arizona Rangers of the Rookie-level Arizona League in 2009. Hart spent the 2010 and 2011 season as the hitting coach of the Hickory Crawdads of the Single–A South Atlantic League. Hart served as the hitting coach of the Frisco RoughRiders of the Double-A Texas League from 2012 through 2019. He returned to Hickory as their hitting coach for the 2020 season.

Hart spent the 2023 and 2024 campaigns as the assistant hitting coach for the Miami Marlins. On October 2, 2024, Hart was fired alongside the entirety of the Marlins coaching staff.

In 2026, he was hired as the hitting coach for the Frisco RoughRiders the Double-A affiliate of the Texas Rangers.
