= Ryan Ludwick =

American baseball player (born 1978)

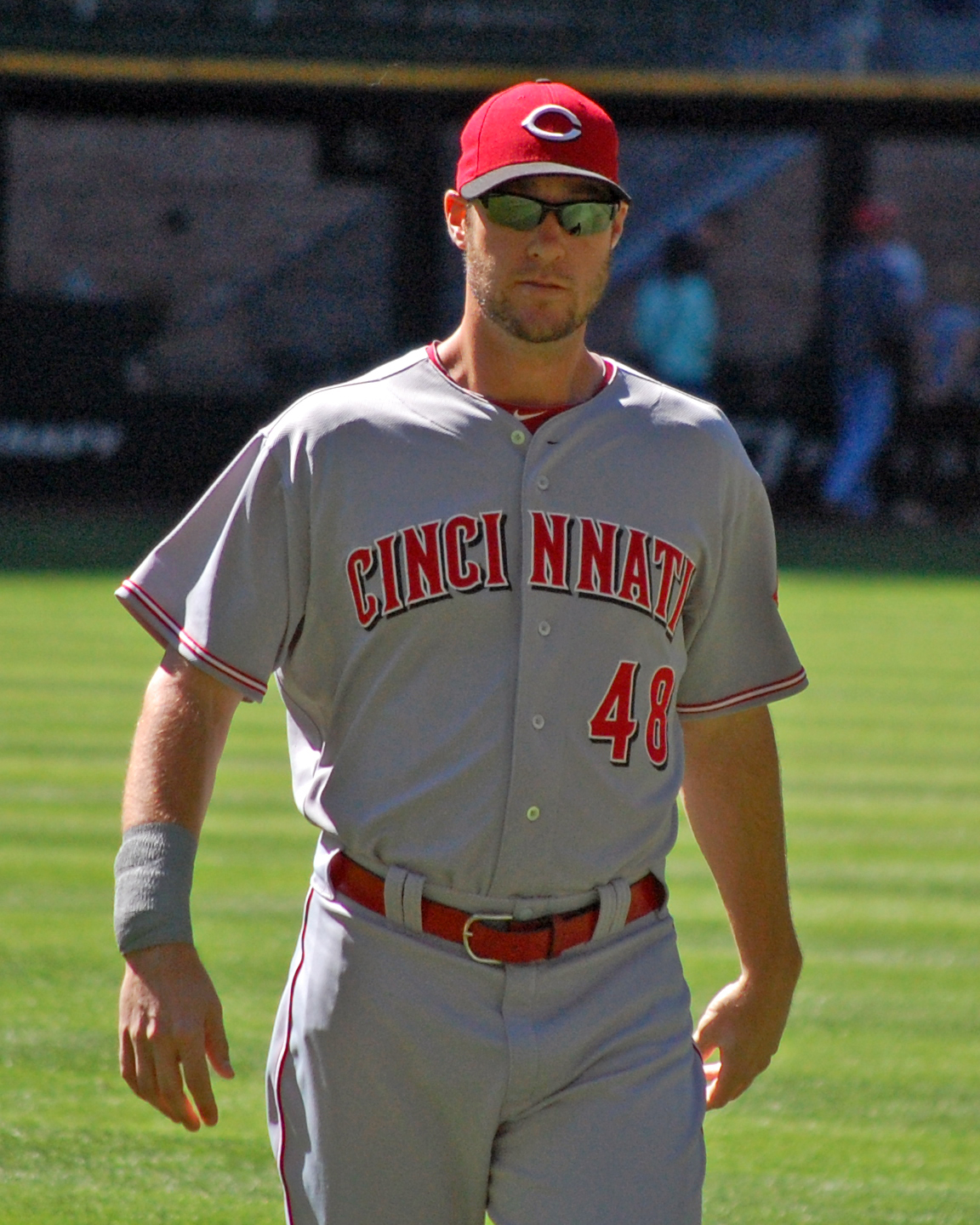
- Ludwick with the Cincinnati Reds
- Outfielder
- Born: July 13, 1978 (age 48); Satellite Beach, Florida, U.S.
- Batted: Right Threw: Left

MLB debut
- June 5, 2002, for the Texas Rangers

Last MLB appearance
- September 27, 2014, for the Cincinnati Reds

MLB statistics
- Batting average: .260
- Home runs: 154
- Runs batted in: 587
- Stats at Baseball Reference

Teams
- Texas Rangers (2002–2003); Cleveland Indians (2003–2005); St. Louis Cardinals (2007–2010); San Diego Padres (2010–2011); Pittsburgh Pirates (2011); Cincinnati Reds (2012–2014)

Career highlights and awards
- All-Star (2008); Silver Slugger Award (2008)

Ryan Andrew Ludwick (born July 13, 1978) is an American former professional baseball outfielder. He has played in Major League Baseball (MLB) for the Texas Rangers, Cleveland Indians, St. Louis Cardinals, San Diego Padres, Pittsburgh Pirates, and Cincinnati Reds. His brother Eric also played four MLB seasons as a pitcher.

== Playing career ==
=== High school, college, and minor leagues ===
Ludwick attended Durango High School in Las Vegas, Nevada.

Ludwick then enrolled at the University of Nevada, Las Vegas (UNLV), and played for the UNLV Rebels baseball team for three seasons. He was named to the Baseball America all-Freshman team in 1997 after batting .354 with 16 home runs and 68 runs batted in (RBIs) and was All-Western Athletic Conference in 1999, hitting .381 with 13 home runs and 69 RBIs. Ludwick had a .363 career batting average at UNLV.

Ludwick was chosen in the second-round (60th overall) of the 1999 Major League Baseball draft by the Oakland Athletics. He was traded to the Texas Rangers before the 2002 season, along with Gerald Laird, Jason Hart, and Mario Ramos, for first baseman Carlos Peña and pitcher Mike Venafro.

=== Texas Rangers, Cleveland Indians, back to minors ===
Ludwick batted right-handed and threw with his left hand. In the entire history of Major League Baseball through the 2008 season, and including the National Association of 1871-75 (not currently counted as a major league by MLB), only 57 players who played at least half their games at a position other than pitcher batted right and threw left.

Ludwick made his major league debut with the Rangers in 2002, but his season was cut short when he fractured his hip the same year, an injury which significantly hampered his career. In 2003, Ludwick was traded by the Rangers to the Cleveland Indians for pitcher Ricardo Rodríguez and outfielder Shane Spencer. He was designated for assignment and sent to Triple-A in June 2005.

=== Toledo Mud Hens ===
Ludwick spent the 2006 season playing for the Toledo Mud Hens, the Triple-A affiliate of the Detroit Tigers, and was named to the International League team for the 2006 Triple-A All-Star Game. Ludwick also help the Mud Hens win the Governors' Cup in 2006. Ludwick enjoyed great success in the Detroit organization, but due to a surplus of outfielders, Detroit did not offer Ludwick a new contract.

=== St. Louis Cardinals: All-Star ===
In 2007, Ludwick was invited to spring training by the Cardinals and started in Triple-A Memphis. On May 6, 2007, Ludwick was promoted to the Cardinals after Preston Wilson went on the DL. In the 29 games preceding Ludwick's promotion, he hit .340 with 0 home runs but had 50 RBIs at Memphis.

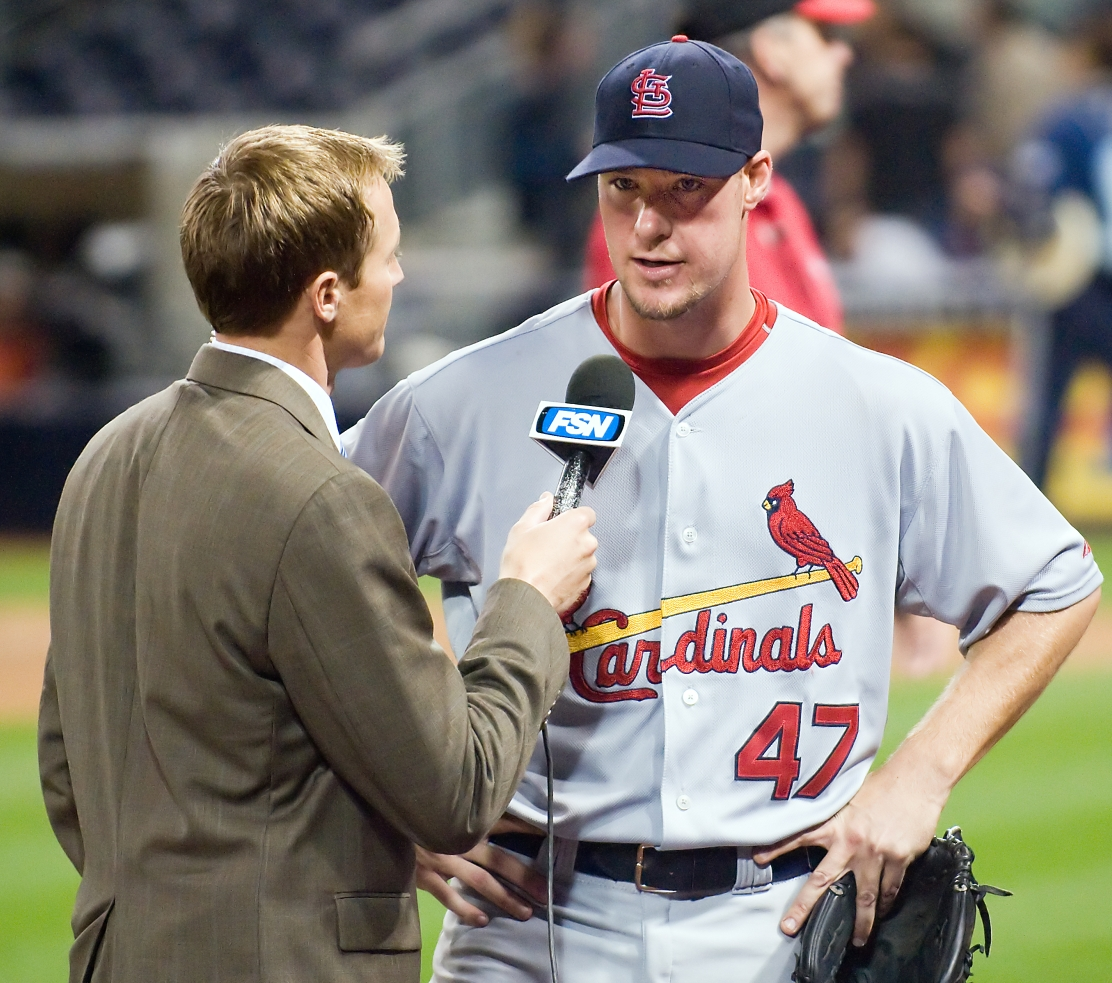
Ludwick (right) during his tenure with the St. Louis Cardinals in 2008.

His fast start in 2008 earned him an everyday player role. Ludwick was named to his first All-Star game on July 6 at Yankee Stadium in New York City. He won the National League Player of the Week Award for July 27-August 2. On August 14, Ludwick hit his 29th home run of the 2008 season; this broke the record for the most home runs in a season by a player who throws left-handed yet bats right-handed previously held by Rickey Henderson.

Ludwick would go on to win a Silver Slugger Award at the end of the 2008 season for his offensive performance along with fellow outfielders Matt Holliday and Ryan Braun. That year, Ludwick hit 37 home runs, 40 doubles, 113 RBIs, 3 triples and a solid .299 batting average.

After his breakout season of 2008, Ludwick started out 2009 with a solid April, posting similar figures to his 2008 season by hitting .297 with five home runs, and 19 RBIs. He was then slowed by a strained right hamstring which placed him on the DL for 15 games. After returning from his injury, Ludwick struggled with a .200 average during the month of June. He had a productive July, hitting .340, with six home runs and a league-leading 28 RBIs, landing him NL Player of the Month honors. This gave the Cardinals 3 out of the last 4 NL Player of the Month awards, coupled with Albert Pujols's awards in April and June. At the end of the 2009 season Ludwick finished batting .265 with 22 home runs and 97 RBIs. Ludwick was primarily a right fielder, but also got playing time in left field and occasionally in center field.

During the 2010 offseason, Ludwick and the Cardinals avoided arbitration, agreeing to a one-year, $5.45 million contract for 2010. Through June 15, he hit .451 with runners in scoring position, second-best among all MLB players. Additionally, he batted .476 with 11 RBIs with runners in scoring position and two out. His strong performance with runners in scoring position lead to him being placed in the cleanup role on June 14 against the Seattle Mariners. The move paid off, as he hit a three-run home run in his first at bat, and went 2-for-4 with a sacrifice fly in the game.

=== San Diego Padres ===
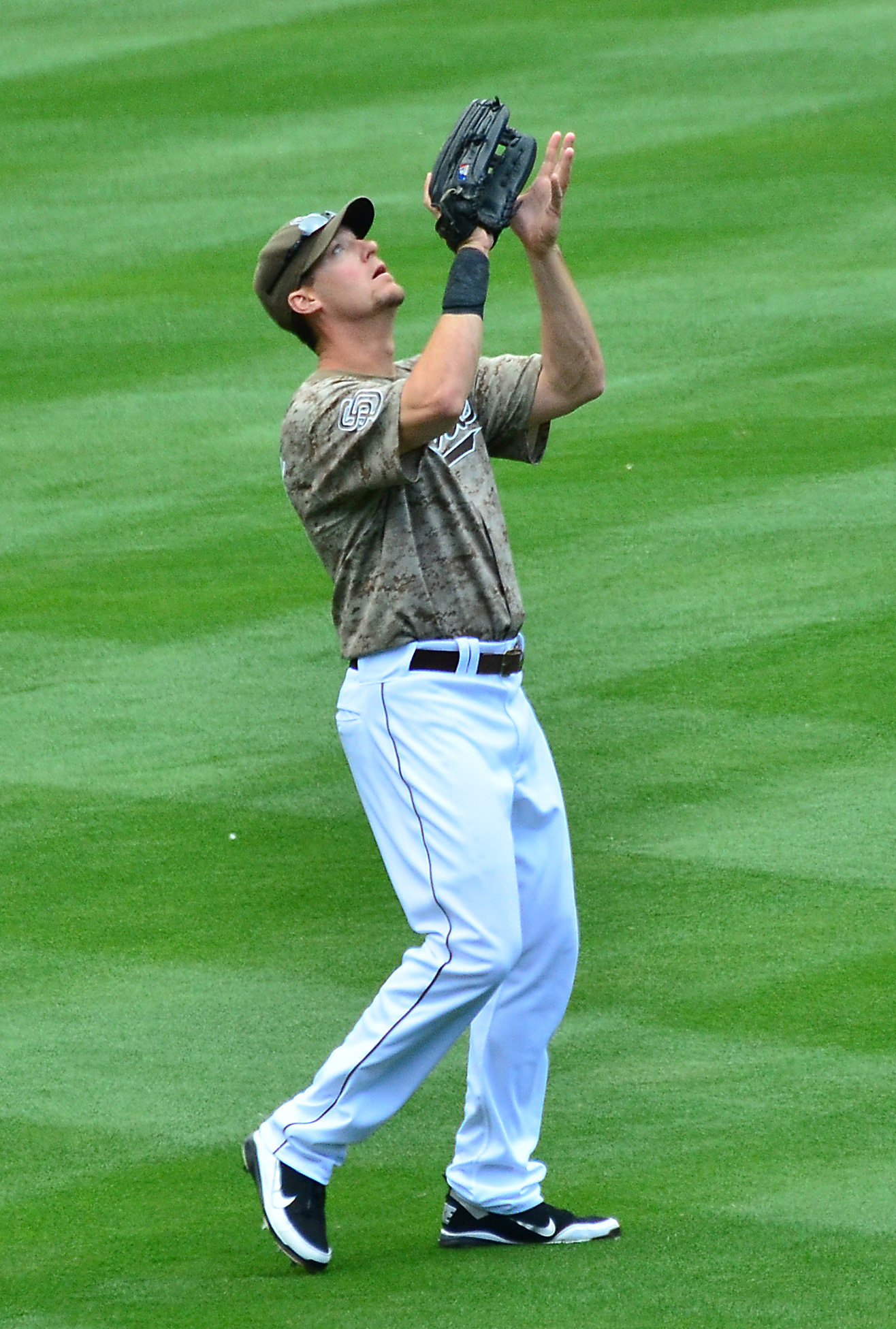
Ludwick playing for the San Diego Padres in 2011.

Ludwick was traded to the San Diego Padres in a three-team deal on July 31, 2010, which sent starting pitcher Jake Westbrook and minor leaguer Nick Greenwood to the Cardinals and Corey Kluber to the Indians. Ludwick received a standing ovation from the crowd in his first return to St. Louis, and he responded with a tip of his cap to the fans.

Ludwick's stats took a hit in 2011 due to poor production at the Padres home field, Petco Park. At the end of his tenure as a Padre, Ludwick was hitting .238 with 11 home runs and 64 runs batted in and 42 runs scored. He accounted for 25.3 percent of the Padres' runs. By comparison, Adrián González accounted for 23.6 percent of the Padres' runs in 2010.

=== Pittsburgh Pirates ===
In the final hour of the 2011 MLB non-waiver trading deadline on July 31, San Diego traded Ludwick to the Pittsburgh Pirates for a player to be named later.

=== Cincinnati Reds ===
On January 16, 2012, Ludwick agreed to terms with the Cincinnati Reds on a one-year contract worth $2.5M with an option for a second year in 2013. After initially splitting the left field duties with Chris Heisey, Ludwick eventually got most of the starts, often batting cleanup in the lineup as a right-handed hitter between lefties Joey Votto and Jay Bruce. In 125 games, he hit .275/.346/.531 with 26 home runs and 80 RBIs. Ludwick started all 5 postseason games in the NLDS against the Giants, hitting .333 with 3 home runs and 4 RBIs.

He declined his option on October 31, and became a free agent. He re-signed with the Reds to a two-year, $15 million deal with a mutual option for 2015 on December 10, 2012.

On Opening Day 2013, Ludwick tore cartilage in his right shoulder as well as dislocating it, requiring surgery. Ludwick was placed on the 60-day disabled list, and returned to the Reds on August 12. In 38 games, he hit .240/.293/.326 with 2 home runs and 12 RBIs. In the Wild Card game against the Pirates, Ludwick went 3–4 with 2 doubles in the loss.

=== Second stint with Rangers ===
Ludwick signed a minor league deal with the Texas Rangers on February 4, 2015. On March 29, he was released by the Rangers.

On January 21, 2016, Ludwick formally announced his retirement.

=== Hall of Fame Inductions ===
Ludwick has been inducted into both the Southern Nevada Sports Hall of Fame and the UNLV Hall of Fame.

== Coaching career ==
On December 18, 2025, Ludwick was announced as an outfield coordinator within the player development department of the St. Louis Cardinals.

== Personal life ==
Ludwick and his wife, Joanie, reside in Georgetown, Texas, and have one son, Stetson Tyler. Ludwick has stated that he chose his son's name due to his affinity for Stetson hats.

Awards and achievements
Preceded by Albert Pujols	National League Player of the Month; July, 2009	Succeeded by Ryan Howard
