= Paul Rivard =

Canadian ice hockey player

- Born: January 15, 1896 Emerson, Manitoba, Canada
- Died: February 1, 1991 (aged 95) Vernon, British Columbia, Canada
- Height: 5 ft 10 in (178 cm)
- Weight: 165 lb (75 kg; 11 st 11 lb)
- Position: Centre
- Shot: Left
- Played for: Regina Capitals
- Playing career: 1921–1923

Paul Emile Rivard (January 15, 1896 – February 1, 1991) was a Canadian professional ice hockey player. He played with the Regina Capitals of the Western Canada Hockey League.

He was the last surviving former player of the Regina Capitals.
