= Percy Traub =

Canadian ice hockey player

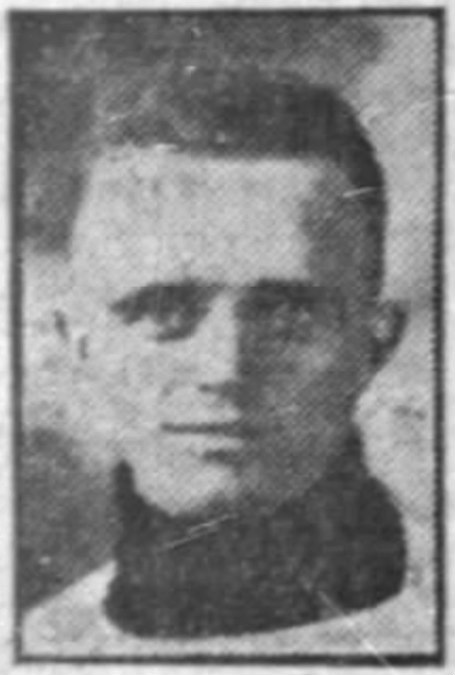
- Born: August 23, 1896; Chesley, Ontario, Canada
- Died: May 5, 1948 (aged 51); Swift Current, Saskatchewan‚ Canada
- Height: 5 ft 9 in (175 cm)
- Weight: 160 lb (73 kg; 11 st 6 lb)
- Position: Defence
- Shot: Left
- Played for: Regina Capitals; Portland Rosebuds; Chicago Black Hawks; Detroit Cougars
- Playing career: 1921–1929

Percy Luthere "Puss" Traub (August 23, 1896 – May 5, 1948) was a Canadian ice hockey player who played professionally between 1921 and 1929 for the Regina Capitals and Portland Rosebuds of the Western Canada Hockey League/Western Hockey League and with the Chicago Black Hawks and Detroit Cougars of the National Hockey League.

== Playing career ==
Traub played for the Regina Victorias from 1915 to 1916, and 1917 to 1921, Regina 217th Battalion from 1916 to 1917, Regina Depot from 1917 to 1918, Regina Capitals from 1921 to 1925, Portland Rosebuds from 1925 to 1926, Chicago Black Hawks from 1926 to 1927, and the Detroit Cougars from 1928 to 1930. Traub was a member of the WCHL Second All-Star Team in 1922 and 1923, and the WCHL First All-Star Team in 1924.

== Post-playing career ==
After his hockey career Traub turned to refereeing and then went into the insurance business.

Traub died at the age of 51 from a heart attack and was buried in Mount Pleasant Burial Park in Swift Current, Saskatchewan.

== Career statistics ==
=== Regular season and playoffs ===
			Regular season					Playoffs
Season	Team	League	GP	G	A	Pts	PIM	GP	G	A	Pts	PIM
1915–16	Regina Victorias	S-SSHL	9	1	0	1	11	—	—	—	—	—
1916–17	Regina 217th Battalion	S-SSHL	7	2	3	5	19	—	—	—	—	—
1917–18	Regina Depot	S-SSHL	6	0	1	1	23	—	—	—	—	—
1918–19	Regina Victorias	SIHA	—	—	—	—	—	—	—	—	—	—
1919–20	Regina Victorias	SSHL	12	2	2	4	20	2	1	0	1	0
1920–21	Regina Victorias	SSHL	15	4	4	8	22	4	0	2	2	2
1921–22	Regina Capitals	WCHL	25	8	2	10	32	4	0	1	1	0
1921–22	Regina Capitals	West-PO	—	—	—	—	—	2	0	0	0	0
1922–23	Regina Capitals	WCHL	26	3	5	8	27	2	0	0	0	4
1923–24	Regina Capitals	WCHL	27	2	4	6	48	2	0	0	0	4
1924–25	Regina Capitals	WCHL	26	4	5	9	61	—	—	—	—	—
1925–26	Portland Rosebuds	WHL	28	1	3	4	66	—	—	—	—	—
1926–27	Chicago Black Hawks	NHL	42	0	2	2	93	—	—	—	—	—
1927–28	Detroit Cougars	NHL	44	3	1	4	78	—	—	—	—	—
1928–29	Detroit Cougars	NHL	44	0	0	0	46	2	0	0	0	0
1930–31	Regina Victorias	S-SSHL	—	—	—	—	—	—	—	—	—	—
WCHL/WHL totals			132	18	19	37	234	8	0	1	1	8
NHL totals			130	3	3	6	217	4	0	0	0	6
