= John Laird =

John Laird may refer to:

- John Laird (American politician) (born 1950), California State Senator
- John Laird (footballer) (1935–2016) Australian rules footballer
- John Laird (philosopher) (1887–1946), Scottish philosopher
- John Laird (shipbuilder) (1805–1874), British shipbuilder and key figure in development of Birkenhead
- John Laird, Baron Laird (1944–2018), British Member of the House of Lords and Ulster Unionist Politician
- John E. Laird (born 1954), computer scientist
- John Houston Laird (1874–1959), politician in Saskatchewan, Canada
- John Keith McBroom Laird (1907–1985), Canadian author, barrister, and solicitor
- Jack Laird (1923–1991), American television writer and actor
- John Laird (minister) (1811-1896) Moderator of the General Assembly to the Free Church of Scotland in 1889
