= List of Tampa Bay Rays team records =

The Tampa Bay Rays are a professional baseball team based in St. Petersburg, Florida. They compete in the Eastern Division of Major League Baseball's (MLB) American League (AL). Tampa Bay first competed in Major League Baseball during the 1998 baseball season as the "Tampa Bay Devil Rays", an expansion team. Prior to the 2008 season, the team's name was officially shortened to "Rays". The list below documents players and teams that hold particular club records.

In twenty-five seasons from 1998 through the end of 2022, the team has an overall record of 1,912 wins and 2,034 losses for a winning percentage of 48.5%. The Rays have appeared in eight postseasons and won two American League pennants, in 2008 and 2020.

Note: To avoid confusion, this list is only updated at the end of each baseball season. Statistics below are through the end of the 2023 season.

== Individual career records ==
These are records of players with the best performance in particular statistical categories during their tenure with the Rays.

=== Career batting ===
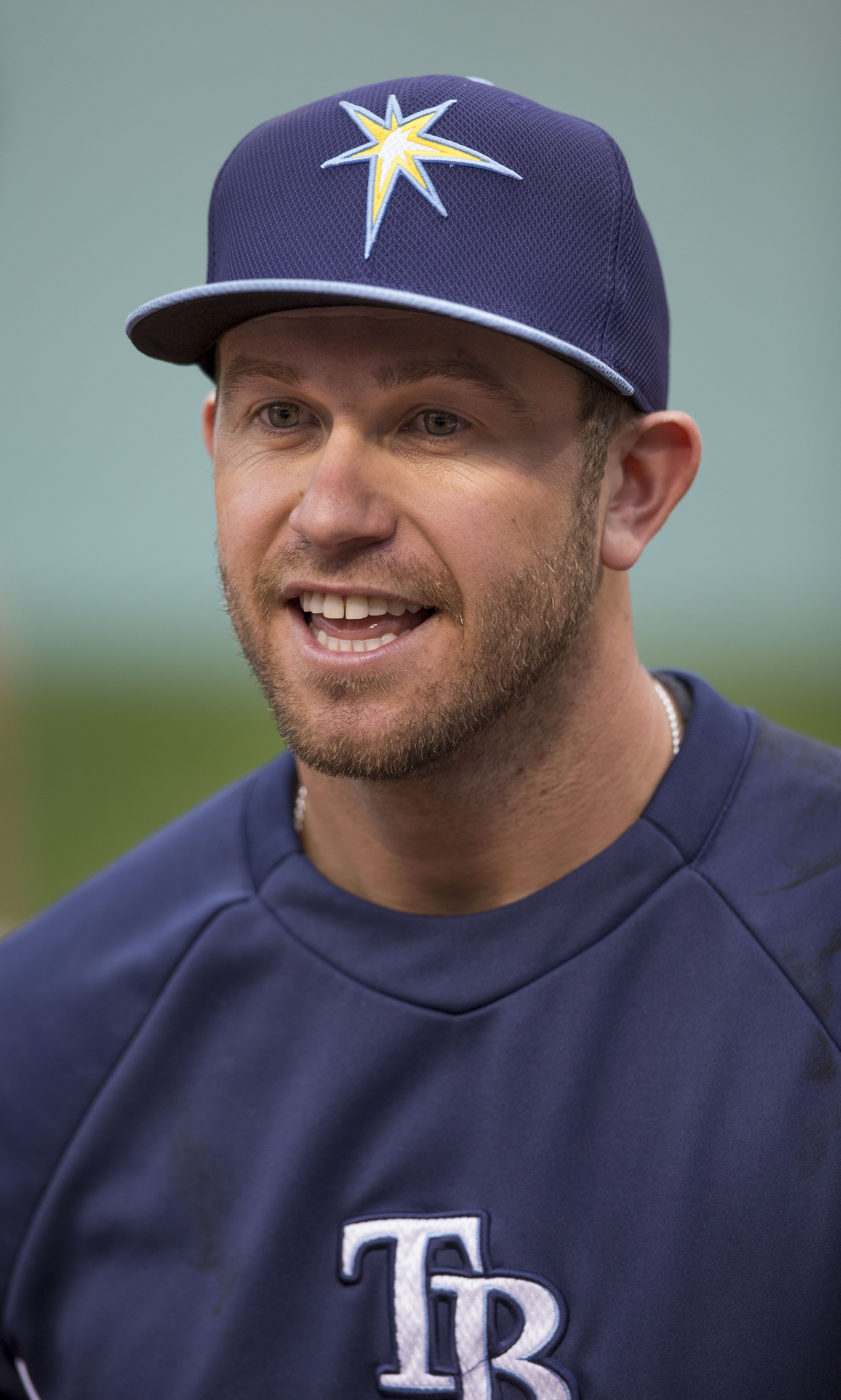
Evan Longoria leads the franchise in several offensive categories.

Career batting records
Statistic	Player	Record	Rays career	Ref
Batting average	Carl Crawford	.296	2002–2010	
On-base percentage	Fred McGriff	.380	1998–2001, 2004	
Slugging percentage	Fred McGriff	.484	1998–2001, 2004	
On-base plus slugging	Fred McGriff	.864	1998–2001, 2004	
Runs	Evan Longoria	780	2008–2017	
Plate appearances	Evan Longoria	6,151	2008–2017	
At bats	Evan Longoria	5,450	2008–2017	
Hits	Carl Crawford	1,480	2002–2010	
Total bases	Evan Longoria	2,630	2008–2017	
Singles	Carl Crawford	1,056	2002–2010	
Doubles	Evan Longoria	338	2008–2017	
Triples	Carl Crawford	105	2002–2010	
Home runs	Evan Longoria	261	2008–2017	
Runs batted in	Evan Longoria	892	2008–2017	
Walks	Evan Longoria	569	2008–2017	
Strikeouts	Evan Longoria	1,220	2008–2017	
Stolen bases	Carl Crawford	409	2002–2010	
Games played	Evan Longoria	1,435	2008–2017	

=== Career pitching ===
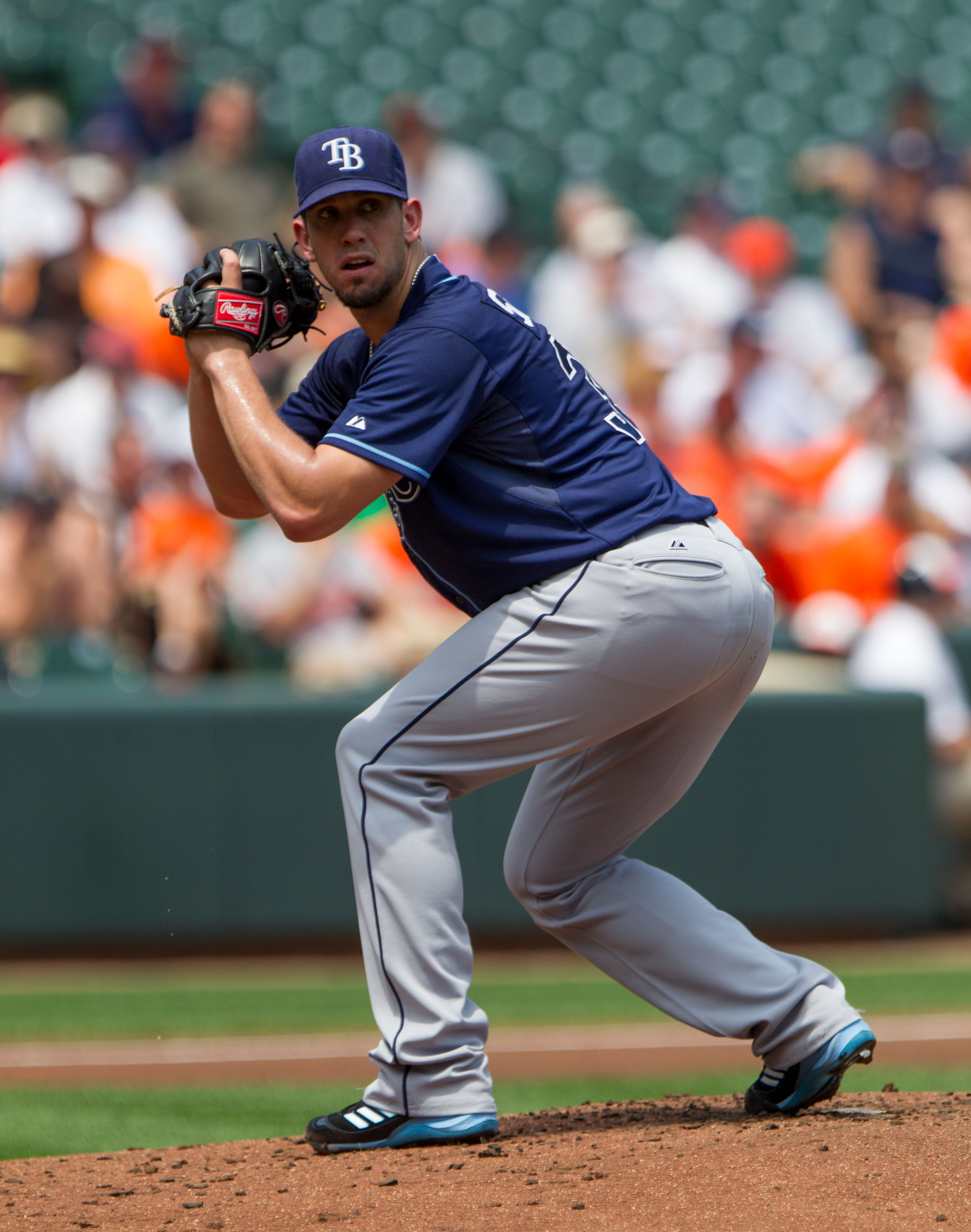
James Shields holds numerous pitching records for Tampa Bay.

Career pitching records
Statistic	Player	Record	Rays career	Ref
Wins	James Shields	87	2006–2012	
Losses	James Shields	73	2006–2012	
Win–loss percentage	David Price	.636	2008–2014	
Earned run average^{[a]}	David Price	3.18	2008–2014	
Saves	Roberto Hernández	101	1998–2000	
Strikeouts	James Shields	1,250	2006–2012	
Shutouts	James Shields	8	2006–2012	
Games	Jake McGee	297	2010–2015	
Innings pitched	James Shields	1,454 2/3	2006–2012	
Games started	James Shields	217	2006–2012	
Games finished	Roberto Hernández	182	1998–2000	
Complete games	James Shields	19	2006–2012	
Walks	Scott Kazmir	382	2004–2009	
Hits allowed	James Shields	1,439	2006–2012	
Wild pitches	Chris Archer	60	2012–2018, 2021	
Hit batsmen	James Shields	49	2006–2012	

== Individual single-season records ==
These are records of Rays players with the best performance in particular statistical categories during a single season.

=== Single-season batting ===
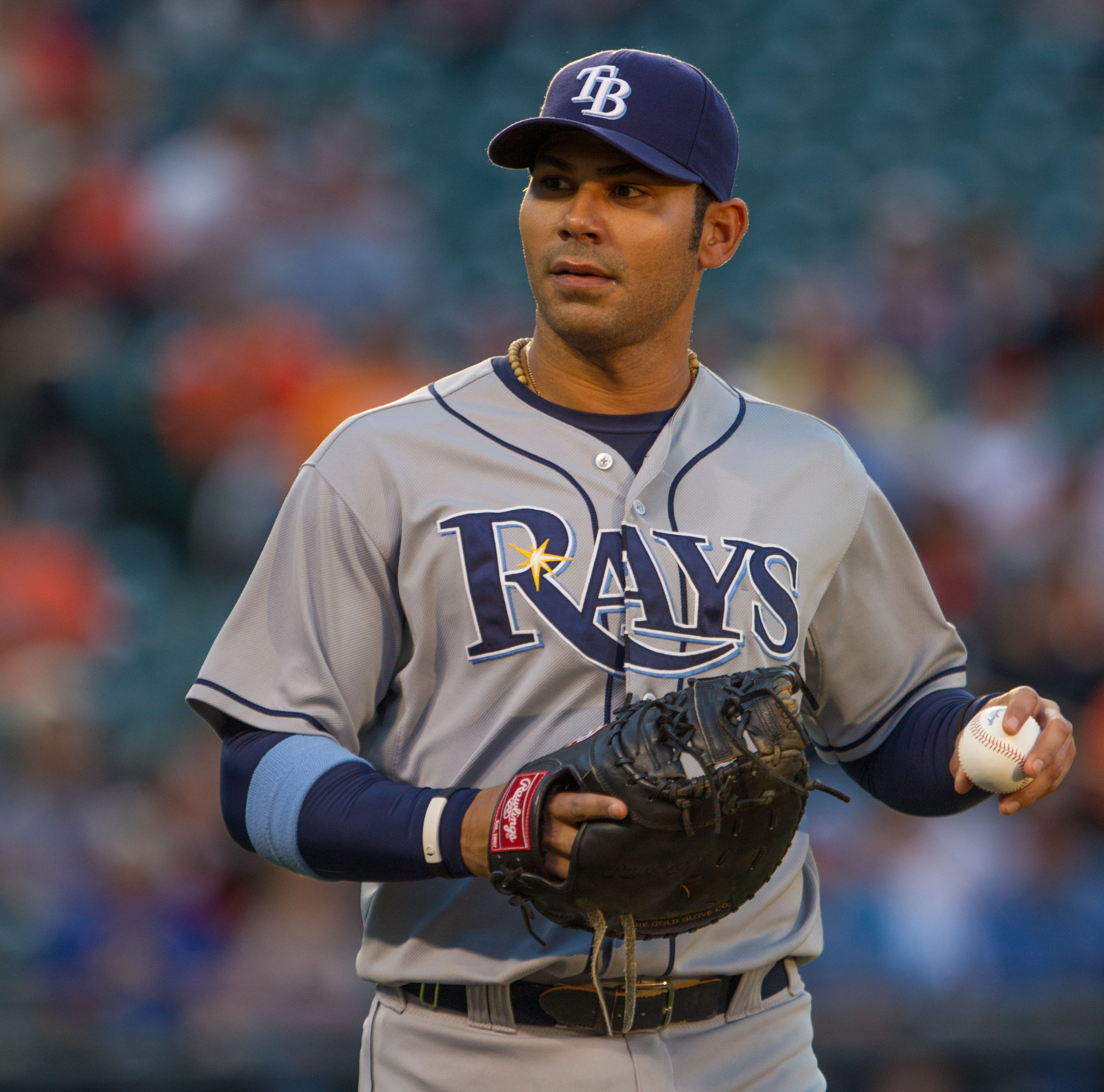
Carlos Peña broke many single-season franchise records in 2007.

Single-season batting records
Statistic	Player	Record	Season	Ref
Batting average	Yandy Diaz	.330	2023	
Home runs	Carlos Peña	46	2007	
RBI	Carlos Peña	121	2007	
Runs	Carl Crawford	110	2010	
Hits	Aubrey Huff	198	2003	
Singles	Carl Crawford	145	2003	
Doubles	Aubrey Huff	47	2003	
Triples	Carl Crawford	19	2004	
Stolen bases	Carl Crawford	60	2009	
At bats	Delmon Young	645	2007	
Slugging percentage	Carlos Peña	.627	2007	
Extra-base hits	Aubrey Huff	84	2003	
Total bases	Aubrey Huff	353	2003	
On-base percentage^{[b]}	Carlos Peña	.411	2007	
On-base plus slugging	Carlos Peña	1.037	2007	
Walks	Carlos Peña	103	2007	
Strikeouts	Carlos Peña	182	2012	

=== Single-season pitching ===
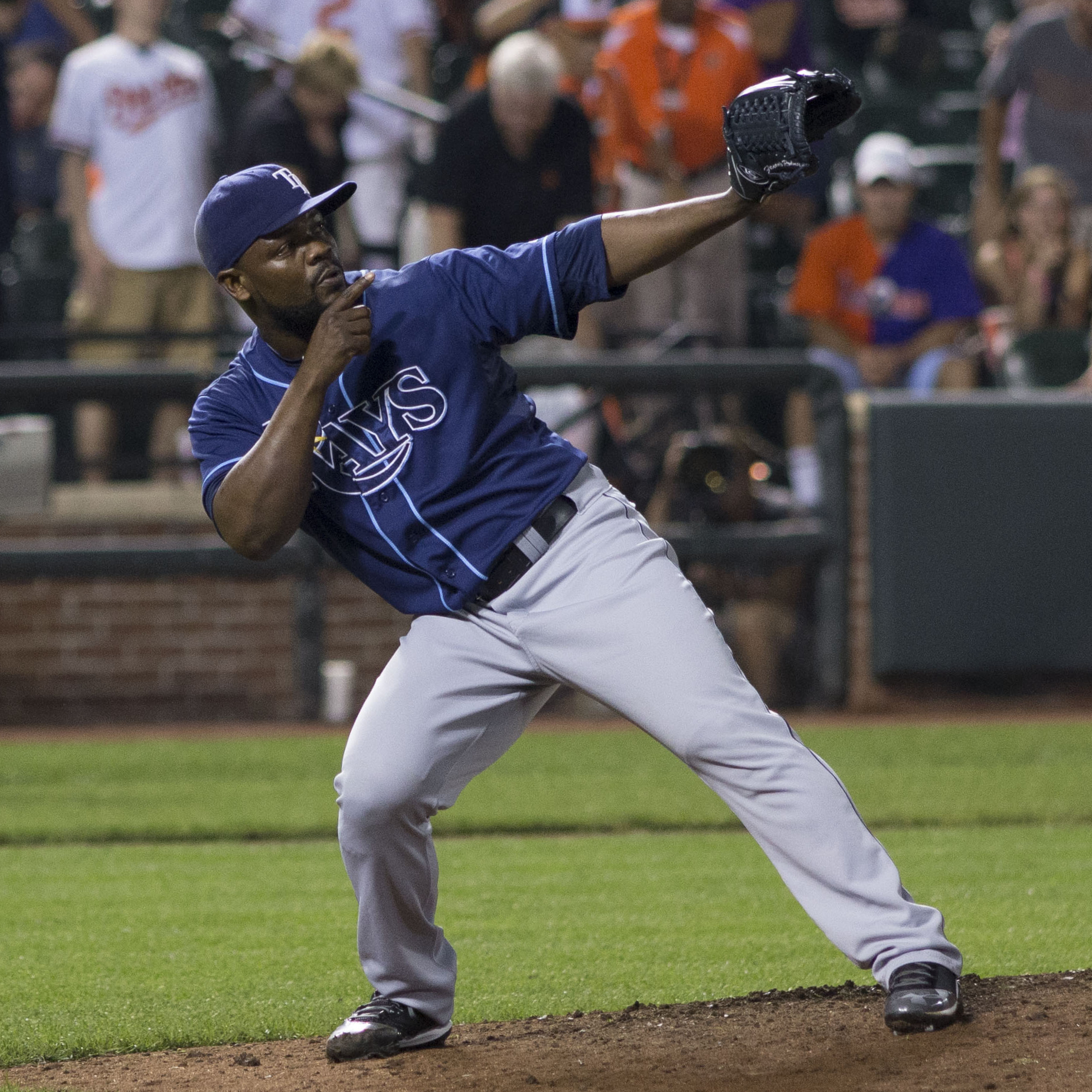
Fernando Rodney set the franchise record for saves in a single season in 2012.

Single-season pitching records
Statistic	Player	Record	Season	Ref(s)
Wins	Blake Snell	21	2018	
Losses	Chris Archer	19	2016	
Strikeouts	Chris Archer	252	2015	
ERA^{[b]}	Blake Snell	1.89	2018	
Earned runs allowed^{[b]}	Tanyon Sturtze	129	2002	
Hits allowed^{[b]}	Tanyon Sturtze	271	2002	
Shutouts	James Shields	4	2011	
Saves	Fernando Rodney	48	2012	
Games	Randy Choate	85	2010	
Games started	Scott Kazmir; David Price; Chris Archer	34	2007; 2011; 2015, 2017	
Complete games	James Shields	11	2011	
Innings pitched	James Shields	249 1/3	2011	

== Team season records ==
These are records of Rays teams with the best and worst performances in particular statistical categories during a single season.

=== Season batting ===
Season batting records
Statistic	Record	Season
Home runs	228	2017
Runs	857	2021
Hits	1,531	1999
Doubles	311	2001
Triples	46	2004
Total bases	2,427	2019
Strikeouts	1,542	2021
Stolen bases	194	2009

=== Season pitching ===
Season pitching records
Statistic	Record	Season
Hits allowed	1,649	2007
Runs allowed (most)	944	2007
Runs allowed (fewest)^{[b]}	577	2012
Home runs allowed	215	2002
Strikeouts	1,621	2019
Shutouts	22	2014

== See also ==
- Baseball statistics
- Baseball awards
- List of MLB awards

== Notes ==
- ^{a} Earned run average is calculated as 9 × (ER ÷ IP), where $ER$ is earned runs and $IP$ is innings pitched.
- ^{b} Does not include abbreviated 2020 season.
