= Gerald Laird =

American baseball player (born 1979)

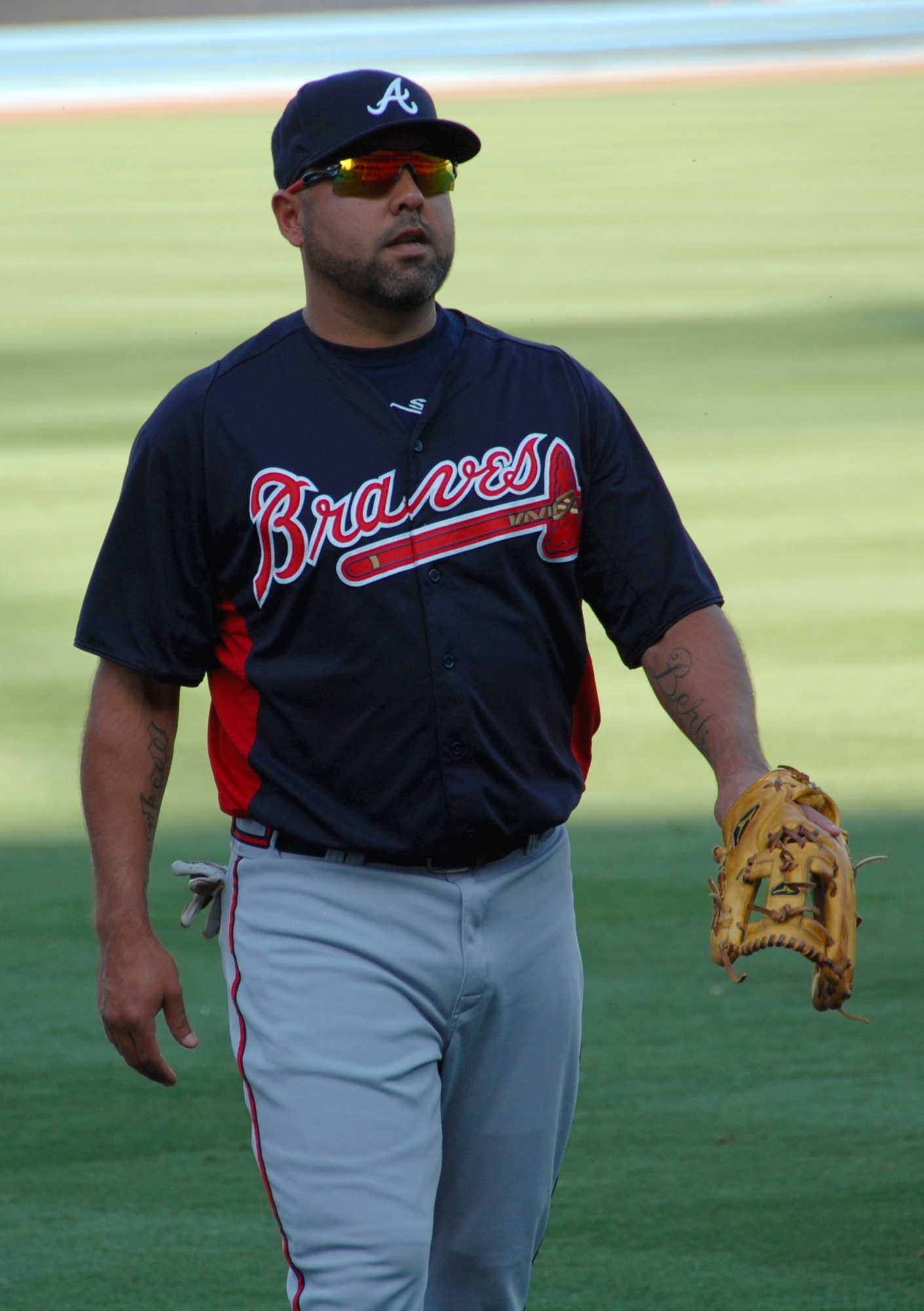
- Laird with the Atlanta Braves
- Catcher
- Born: November 13, 1979 (age 46); Westminster, California, U.S.
- Batted: Right Threw: Right

MLB debut
- April 30, 2003, for the Texas Rangers

Last MLB appearance
- April 8, 2015, for the Arizona Diamondbacks

MLB statistics
- Batting average: .243
- Home runs: 38
- Runs batted in: 238
- Stats at Baseball Reference

Teams
- Texas Rangers (2003–2008); Detroit Tigers (2009–2010); St. Louis Cardinals (2011); Detroit Tigers (2012); Atlanta Braves (2013–2014); Arizona Diamondbacks (2015)

Career highlights and awards
- World Series champion (2011)

Gerald Lee Laird III (born November 13, 1979) is an American former professional baseball catcher. He played in Major League Baseball (MLB) for the Texas Rangers, Detroit Tigers, St. Louis Cardinals, Atlanta Braves, and Arizona Diamondbacks.

== Career ==
=== Oakland Athletics ===
Laird first attended Rancho Alamitos High School, and then later graduated from La Quinta High School in Westminster, California. He was chosen by the Oakland Athletics in the second round of the 1998 draft, but held out for more money. When the A's declined, Laird enrolled in Cypress College and led its baseball team to the Orange Empire Conference Championship. In June 1999, Oakland and Laird negotiated a new contract. In his first minor league season, 1999, he played 60 games with the Low-A Southern Oregon Timberjacks and hit .285. He divided the 2000 season between the rookie-level Arizona League Athletics and High-A Visalia Oaks, but a broken wrist limited his playing time. Going into the 2001 season he was considered a top prospect until he tailed off to .255 with the Modesto A's.

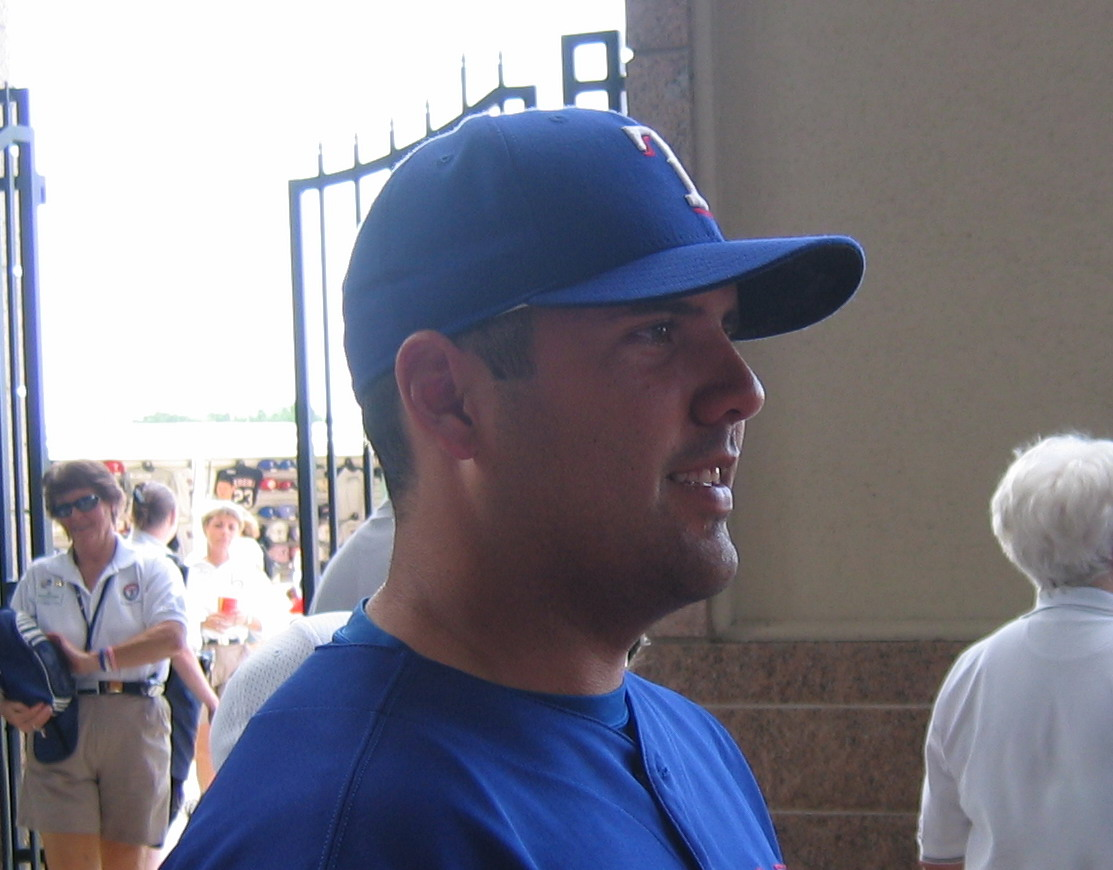
Laird during his tenure with the Texas Rangers in 2005

=== Texas Rangers ===
Shortly before the 2002 season Oakland traded Laird to the Texas Rangers along with outfielder Ryan Ludwick, Jason Hart and Mario Ramos, for slugging first baseman Carlos Peña and southpaw relief pitcher Mike Venafro. Texas assigned Laird to its Double-A Tulsa Drillers, where his strong defensive play and improved batting average (.276) drew plaudits.

He joined the Rangers for 2003 spring training, but was soon farmed out to the Triple-A Oklahoma RedHawks. The parent club recalled him on April 30 when catcher Todd Greene went on the disabled list, and he made his major league debut the same day. But when Greene returned from the disabled list after 15 days, Laird was optioned back to Oklahoma. The Rangers recalled him again in September when the rosters expanded, and he remained with the big league club for the rest of the season. In his two stints with Texas, he got into only 19 games and hit .273 but at the end of the year was chosen for the USA Baseball squad.

Laird won the Rangers' starting catching job in 2004 spring training after the Einar Diaz trade, but after dislocating his thumb in a home plate collision in May ended up on the disabled list and lost his starting job to Rod Barajas. After spending most of the 2005 season in Triple-A, he was called up again as backup catcher for the Rangers in 2006. He went into that season well-regarded around the majors for his defensive skills. Commented San Diego Padres general manager Kevin Towers: "The Rangers knew they had a commodity. The only way they were going to part with him was if some team grossly overpaid [in a trade]." In 78 games in 2006, he hit an improved .296 with seven home runs, earning the starting catcher's job for 2007. New Ranger manager Ron Washington took a special interest in him during spring training: "I just want him to concentrate on making this pitching staff better and helping them to believe in him." He was in the second most double plays among all MLB catchers despite being among the lowest in fielding chances.

=== Detroit Tigers ===
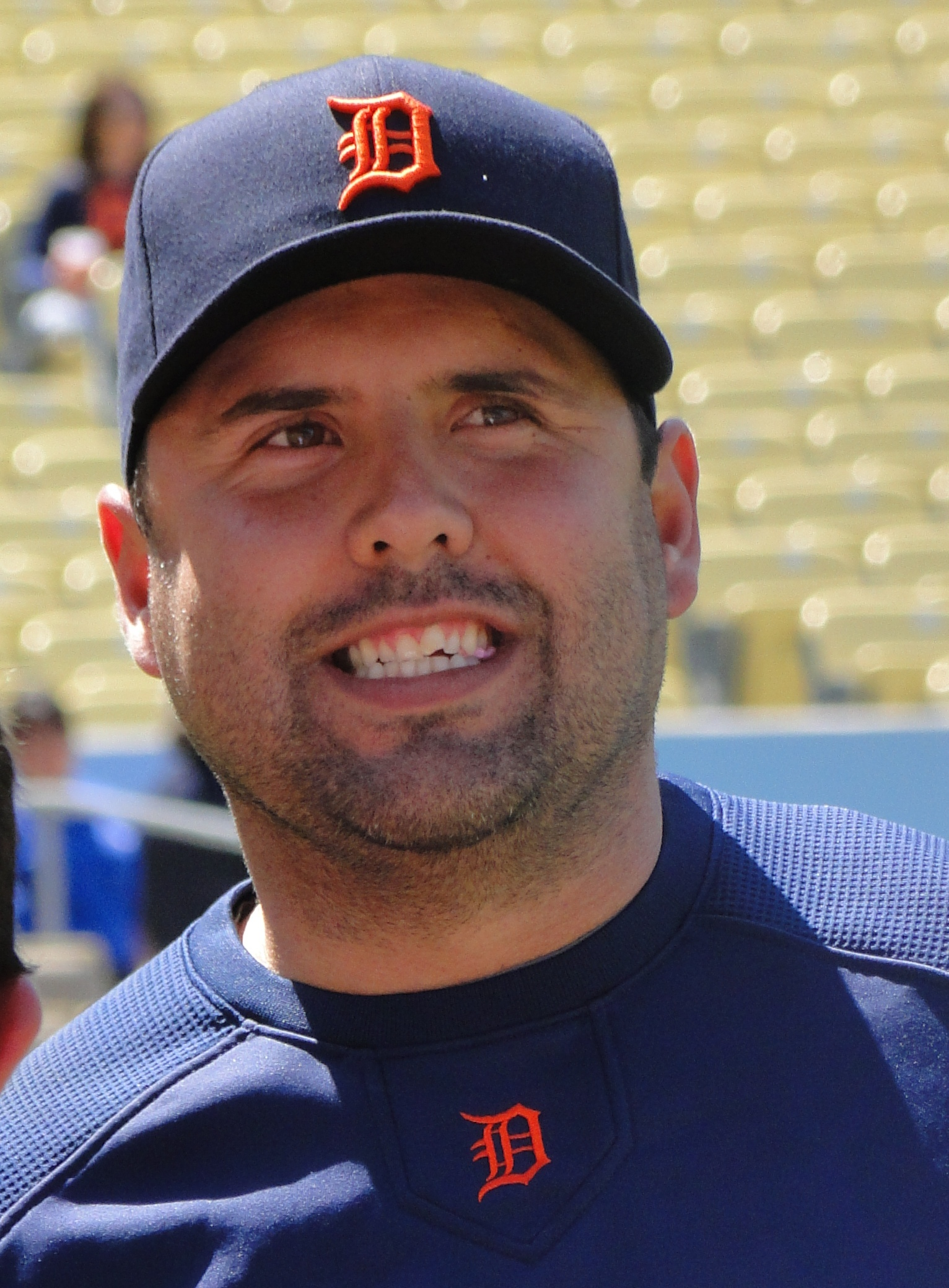
Laird with the Detroit Tigers in 2010

On December 8, 2008, he was traded to the Detroit Tigers for two minor league pitchers, Carlos Melo and Guillermo Moscoso. The Tigers named him starting catcher ahead of Dane Sardinha and Matt Treanor, and Laird rewarded them with the highest caught-stealing throwing average in the American League. In May 2010, while struggling offensively, Laird changed his jersey number from 8 to 12.

=== St. Louis Cardinals ===
The St. Louis Cardinals signed Laird to a one-year contract for the 2011 season, where he won his first World Series ring as backup catcher to All-Star Yadier Molina.

=== Detroit Tigers (second stint) ===
On November 18, 2011, the Detroit Tigers welcomed Laird back with a one-year contract for the 2012 season as backup catcher to Alex Avila while slugger Victor Martinez, often used as a DH rather than as a catcher in any event, was on the disabled list for the entire season. He rewarded them by hitting .282, often hitting DH, in the regular season and helping them come back from well behind the Chicago White Sox to win their second consecutive AL Central Division title, edge the powerful young upstart Oakland Athletics 3–2 in the ALDS thanks to defending MVP Justin Verlander's stellar pitching in Games 1 & 5, and then sweep the suddenly discombobulated New York Yankees 4–0 in the ALCS. Laird had the key hit that put the Tiger's ahead in Kansas City the night they beat the Royals to clinch the AL Central for 2012. He was in his second World Series in a row, which the Tigers lost to the San Francisco Giants 4–0, and became a free agent on October 29.

=== Atlanta Braves ===
After former Braves backup David Ross signed with Boston for a two-year contract early in the off-season, the Braves scavenged the open market for a backup catcher. They found Laird, signing him to a two-year, $3 million contract with up to $750,000 in performance bonuses based on games played. With Brian McCann leaving in free agency, Laird handled the primary backup role to Evan Gattis in 2014. Laird ended his tenure with the Braves posting a .204 batting average.

=== Arizona Diamondbacks ===
On February 2, 2015, he signed a minor league contract with the Arizona Diamondbacks. A back injury sustained during the first month of the season ended Laird's season. He was designated for assignment on August 20, 2015, and released on August 24.

=== Toros de Tijuana ===
On June 16, 2016, Laird signed with the Toros de Tijuana of the Mexican League. In two appearances for Tijuana, Laird went 0-for-1 at the plate. He announced his retirement from professional baseball on April 2, 2017.

== Minor league managing career ==
He retired at the end of the 2016 season to become the manager of the Single-A Detroit Tigers affiliate, the Connecticut Tigers of the New York–Penn League. In 2021 Laird was a coach with the Illinois Valley Pistol Shrimp In December 2021 Laird was hired as the catching coach for the Lotte Giants of the KBO.

== Personal life ==
Laird is represented by sports agent Scott Boras. His younger brother, Brandon has also played in MLB.

Awards
| Preceded by Reed Johnson | AL Rookie of the Month; April 2004 | Succeeded by Kevin Youkilis |
