= Regina Capitals =

- City: Regina, Saskatchewan, Canada
- League: WCHL (1921–1925); WHL (1925–26) (as Portland Rosebuds); PrHL (1926–1928)
- Founded: 1921
- Operated: 1921–1928
- Colors: Red, White, Blue

The Regina Capitals were a professional ice hockey team originally based in the city of Regina, Saskatchewan in the Western Canada Hockey League (WCHL), founded in 1921.

== Western Canada Hockey League Capitals (1921–1926) ==
1921 was the Regina Capitals' first season in the new Western Canada Hockey League, they finished second overall and then upset the Edmonton Eskimos in the playoffs to win the league championship. Winning the league championship meant that the team had to face the winner of the Pacific Coast Hockey Association (PCHA) before being able to challenge for the Stanley Cup. Unfortunately, the up-start Capitals lost to the Vancouver Millionaires of the PCHA. Vancouver went on to face the Toronto St. Patricks of the National Hockey League (NHL), but would lose the best-of-five series for the Stanley Cup 3 games to 2.

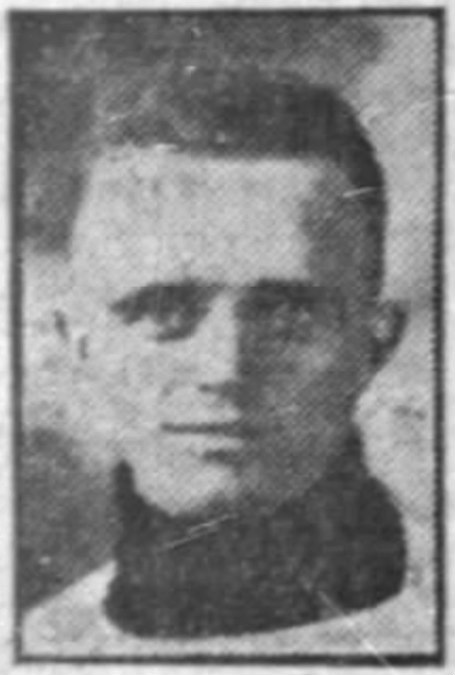
Regina Capitals player Percy Traub.

They finished second overall in each of their first three seasons, with their third season only one point behind first place, but that first season would be the only one in which they would win the playoffs and advance to the next series. After three seasons well above .500, they fell to last place overall in their fourth season (1924–25) with only 8 wins in 28 games.

The Capitals tried spending their way out of their difficulties, but that only caused more problems. With the team in debt and losing money, they followed the NHL's example of heading south across the border and moved to Portland, Oregon for the start of the 1925–26 WHL season. The Regina Capitals renamed themselves the Portland Rosebuds, which was a rekindling of an older, then defunct, team from the PCHA. With that move, they became the only United States–based team in their league. Since they moved to the States, the league had to change its name to reflect that not all of its teams were based in Canada anymore. So, the "Canada" part of the league's name was dropped and it was renamed the Western Hockey League.

The move didn't help the on-ice performance of the team very much. They didn't finish last overall, but with an extra eight games played from the previous season, they only managed to better their total wins by 4 giving them 12 wins in 36 games.

After that season, the Western Hockey League folded. The National Hockey League bought every contract of ever player from the WHL for $258,000. The former Capitals/Rosebuds players would go on to form the nucleus of the expansion Chicago Black Hawks franchise, which began play the following season.

== Prairie Hockey League Capitals (1926–1927) ==
With the collapse of the WHL, many of the players and teams that didn't become part of the NHL re-grouped and formed a new semi-pro league called the Prairie Hockey League (PrHL). A "new" Regina Capitals were born. They finished third overall in the inaugural season of the PrHL, but faltered badly for the second season with only two wins in 26 games. That second season would be the final season for both the Regina Capitals and the Prairie Hockey League as the league disbanded following the season's end.

== Season-by-season record ==
Note: W = Wins, L = Losses, T = Ties, GF= Goals For, GA = Goals Against, Pts = Points

Season	Team name & League	GP	W	L	T	PTS	GF	GA	Finish	Playoffs
1921–22	Regina Capitals (WCHL)	24	14	10	0	28	94	78	2nd in WCHL	Won league Championship
1922–23	Regina Capitals (WCHL)	30	16	14	0	32	93	97	2nd in WCHL	Lost in WCHL finals
1923–24	Regina Capitals (WCHL)	30	17	11	2	36	83	67	2nd in WCHL	Lost in WCHL finals
1924–25	Regina Capitals (WCHL)	28	8	20	0	16	72	121	6th (last) in WCHL	Out of playoffs
1925–26	Portland Rosebuds (WHL)	36	12	16	8	26	84	106	4th in WHL	Out of playoffs
1926–27	Regina Capitals (PrHL)	32	14	16	2	30	110	117	3rd in PrHL
1927–28	Regina Capitals (PrHL)	26	2	19	5	9	46	89	3rd (last) in PrHL

== Head coach ==
- Wes Champ (1921–1925)
- Pete Muldoon (1925–26)

== Notable players ==
- Hubert Davidson, 1916-1933
- George Hay, 1921–1926
- Dick Irvin, 1922–1925
- Bill Laird, 1921–1923
- Paul Rivard, 1896-1991
- Barney Stanley, 1922–1924
- Eddie Shore, 1924–1925

== See also ==
- Western Canada Hockey League
- Pacific Coast Hockey Association
- List of pre-NHL seasons
- Portland Rosebuds
- Chicago Black Hawks
- List of ice hockey teams in Saskatchewan
