= Hubert Davidson =

Canadian ice hockey player

Hubert Fairbairn Davidson
- Born: August 6, 1902 Indian Head, Saskatchewan, Canada
- Died: May 4, 1961 (aged 58) Vermilion, Alberta, Canada
- Height: 5 ft 8 in (173 cm)
- Weight: 175 lb (79 kg; 12 st 7 lb)
- Position: Centre
- Shot: Left
- Played for: Regina Capitals
- Playing career: 1916–1933

Hubert Fairbairn Davidson (August 6, 1902 – May 4, 1961) was a Canadian professional ice hockey player. He played with the Regina Capitals of the Western Canada Hockey League.
