= Bill Laird (ice hockey) =

Canadian ice hockey player

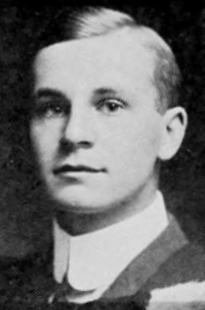
- Laird at the University of Toronto.
- Born: October 29, 1891; Cobourg, Ontario, Canada
- Died: February 16, 1953 (aged 61)
- Height: 5 ft 10 in (178 cm)
- Weight: 180 lb (82 kg; 12 st 12 lb)
- Position: Goaltender
- Caught: Right
- Played for: Regina Capitals
- Playing career: 1907–1922

William Clarence Laird (October 29, 1891 – February 16, 1953) was a Canadian professional ice hockey goaltender. He played with the Regina Capitals of the Western Canada Hockey League from 1921 to 1923.
