= Lard (surname) =

Lard is a surname which is a variation of the Scottish name and title "Laird". In the United States, Laird has many different spellings, including Lard, Leaird, Leard, and Leird, presumably due to oral census takers. The name may refer to:

- Allan Lard (1866–1946), American golfer
- Rebecca Hammond Lard (1772–1855), American poet
- Keith Lard, fictional character in Peter Kay television series

== See also ==
- Lard (disambiguation)
