= William Laird (footballer) =

Scottish footballer

Personal information
- Place of birth: Larkhall, Scotland
- Height: 5 ft 9 in (1.75 m)
- Position: Forward

Senior career*
Years	Team	Apps	(Gls)
1930–1931	Kirkmuirhill		
1931	Blantyre Celtic		
1931–1932	Sunderland	2	(0)
1932–1933	Gateshead	2	(1)
1933–193?	Excelsior Roubaix		
- * Club domestic league appearances and goals

William Laird was a Scottish professional footballer who played as a forward for Sunderland.
