= Robbin Laird =

- Born: 1946
- Education: Columbia University
- Occupation: defense analyst

Robbin F. Laird (born 1946) is a military and security analyst.

== Biography ==
He has taught at Columbia University, Queens College, Princeton University and Johns Hopkins University. He worked with The Center for Defense Analysis and the Institute for Defense Analysis. He is a member of the Board of Contributors of AOL Defense and writes for The Diplomat. He is the director of the ICSA, LLC since 2000 and co-founder of the website Second Line of Defense, since 2010 and of Defense.info since 2018.

== Bibliography ==
- The Scientific-Technological Revolution and Soviet Foreign Policy: Pergamon Policy Studies on International Politics, 1982, with Erik P. Hoffmann
- Politics of Economic Modernization in the Soviet Union, 1982, with Erik P. Hoffman
- Soviet Union and Strategic Arms, 1985, with Dale R. Herspring
- Technocratic Socialism: The Soviet Union in the Advanced Industrial Era, 1985, with Erik P. Hoffman
- Soviet Union, the West and the Nuclear Arms Race, 1986
- French Security Policy, 1986
- Strangers and Friends: The Franco-German Security Relationship, 1989
- West European Arms Control Policy, 1989
- USSR and the Western Alliance, 1989, with Susan Clark
- The Future of Deterrence: NATO Nuclear Forces Aft Inf, 1989
- The Soviets, Germany, and the New Europe, 1991
- Soviet Foreign Policy: Classic and Contemporary, 1991, with Frederick J. Fleron and Erik P. Hoffmann
- Classic Issues in Soviet Foreign Policy: From Lenin to Brezhnev, 1991, with Erik P. Hoffmann and Frederic J. Fleron
- The Revolution in Military Affairs: Allied Perspectives, 2012, with Holger H Mey
- Three Dimensional Warriors: Second Edition, 2013
- Rebuilding American Military Power in the Pacific: A 21st-Century Strategy, 2013, with Edward Timperlake
- The F-35 and 21st Century Defence: Shaping a Way Ahead, 2016
- France, The Soviet Union, And The Nuclear Weapons Issue, 2019
- The Return of Direct Defense in Europe:Meeting the 21st Century Authoritarian Challenge, 2020, with Murielle Delaporte
- Joint by Design: The Evolution of Australian Defence Strategy, 2020
- Training for the High End Fight: The Strategic Shift of the 2020s, 2021
- The USSR and the Western Alliance, re-issue 2021, with Susan Clark
- 2020: A Pivotal Year?: Navigating Strategic Change at a Time of COVID-19 Disruption, 2021
- The U.S. Marine Corps Transformation Path: Preparing for the High-End Fight, 2022
- Defense XXI: Shaping a Way Ahead for the United States and Its Allies, 2022
- Assessing Global Change: Strategic Perspectives of Dr. Harald Malmgren, 2025, with Harald Malmgren
