= Sandy Laird =

Scottish footballer

Personal information
- Full name: Alexander Laird
- Date of birth: 21 October 1901
- Place of birth: Denny, Falkirk, Scotland
- Position: Inside forward

Senior career*
Years	Team	Apps	(Gls)
1920–1921	Longcroft Thistle		
1921–1922	Rangers		
1922–1924	Preston North End	28	(4)
1924–1926	Falkirk		
1926	Armadale		
Total		28	(4)
- * Club domestic league appearances and goals

Alexander Laird (born 21 October 1901) was a Scottish footballer who played in the Football League for Preston North End.
