= Lairds Creek =

Stream in Morris County, Kansas, U.S.

Coordinates: 38.72945°N 96.57445°W

Lairds Creek is a stream in Morris County, Kansas, in the United States.

A variant name is Lards Creek. The stream was named for William F. Lard, a pioneer settler.

== See also ==
- List of rivers of Kansas
