= John Laird (footballer) =

Australian rules footballer

Personal information
- Full name: John Angus Laird
- Born: 16 August 1935
- Died: 13 May 2016 (aged 80)
- Height: 188 cm (6 ft 2 in)
- Weight: 89 kg (196 lb)

Playing career^{1}
Years	Club	Games (Goals)
1957	Geelong	3 (0)
- ^{1} Playing statistics correct to the end of 1957.

John Angus Laird (16 August 1935 - 13 May 2016) was an Australian rules footballer who played with Geelong in the Victorian Football League (VFL).
