= Laird (given name) =

Laird is a masculine given name. Notable people with the name include:

- Laird Howard Barber (1848–1928), American lawyer, jurist, and politician
- Laird Barron (born 1970), American author and poet
- Laird Bell (1883–1965), American attorney, philanthropist, and businessman
- Laird Cregar (1913–1944), American film actor
- Laird Hamilton (born 1964), American big-wave surfer and co-inventor of tow-in surfing
- Laird Smith (1913–1999), Australian rules footballer
- Laird A. Thompson (born 1947), American professor of astronomy
