= Lerd, Iran =

Lerd or Lard (Persian: لرد) in Iran may refer to:

- Lerd, Ardabil
- Lerd, Semnan
