= Mike Venafro =

American baseball player (born 1973)

- Relief pitcher
- Born: August 2, 1973 (age 52); Takoma Park, Maryland, U.S.
- Batted: Left Threw: Left

MLB debut
- April 24, 1999, for the Texas Rangers

Last MLB appearance
- September 30, 2006, for the Colorado Rockies

MLB statistics
- Win–loss record: 15–10
- Earned run average: 4.09
- Strikeout: 131
- Stats at Baseball Reference

Teams
- Texas Rangers (1999–2001); Oakland Athletics (2002); Tampa Bay Devil Rays (2003); Los Angeles Dodgers (2004); Colorado Rockies (2006)

Michael Robert Venafro (born August 2, 1973) is an American former Major League Baseball left-handed relief pitcher. He played professionally for the Texas Rangers, Oakland Athletics, Tampa Bay Devil Rays, Los Angeles Dodgers and the Colorado Rockies. He is currently a scout for the San Diego Padres.

== Biography ==
Venafro was born in Takoma Park, Maryland and graduated from Paul VI High School in northern Virginia. He is an alumnus of James Madison University in Harrisonburg, Virginia.

Drafted by the Texas Rangers in the 29th round of the 1995 Major League Baseball draft, Venafro made his Major League Baseball debut with the Rangers on April 24, 1999.

Venafro is often referenced in the best selling book titled Moneyball by Michael Lewis, which details the financial aspects of the Oakland Athletics during the time Venafro played for them. He is also referred to in the 2011 film of the same name during a scene where Billy Beane (Brad Pitt) offers him to the San Francisco Giants to drive down interest in Ricardo Rincón, whom Beane is attempting to acquire from Cleveland at the trading deadline.

Venafro played with three teams in postseason major league baseball including: the Los Angeles Dodgers, Oakland Athletics, and the Texas Rangers. In total, Venafro has played with 14 different baseball organizations. Venafro has 13 years of professional baseball experience; 7 of which are in the major leagues. His major league career ERA is 4.09. He held big league lefthanded batters to a .240/.318/.310 line in parts of seven seasons.
